= Coffee in Iran =

Coffee culture and history in Iran

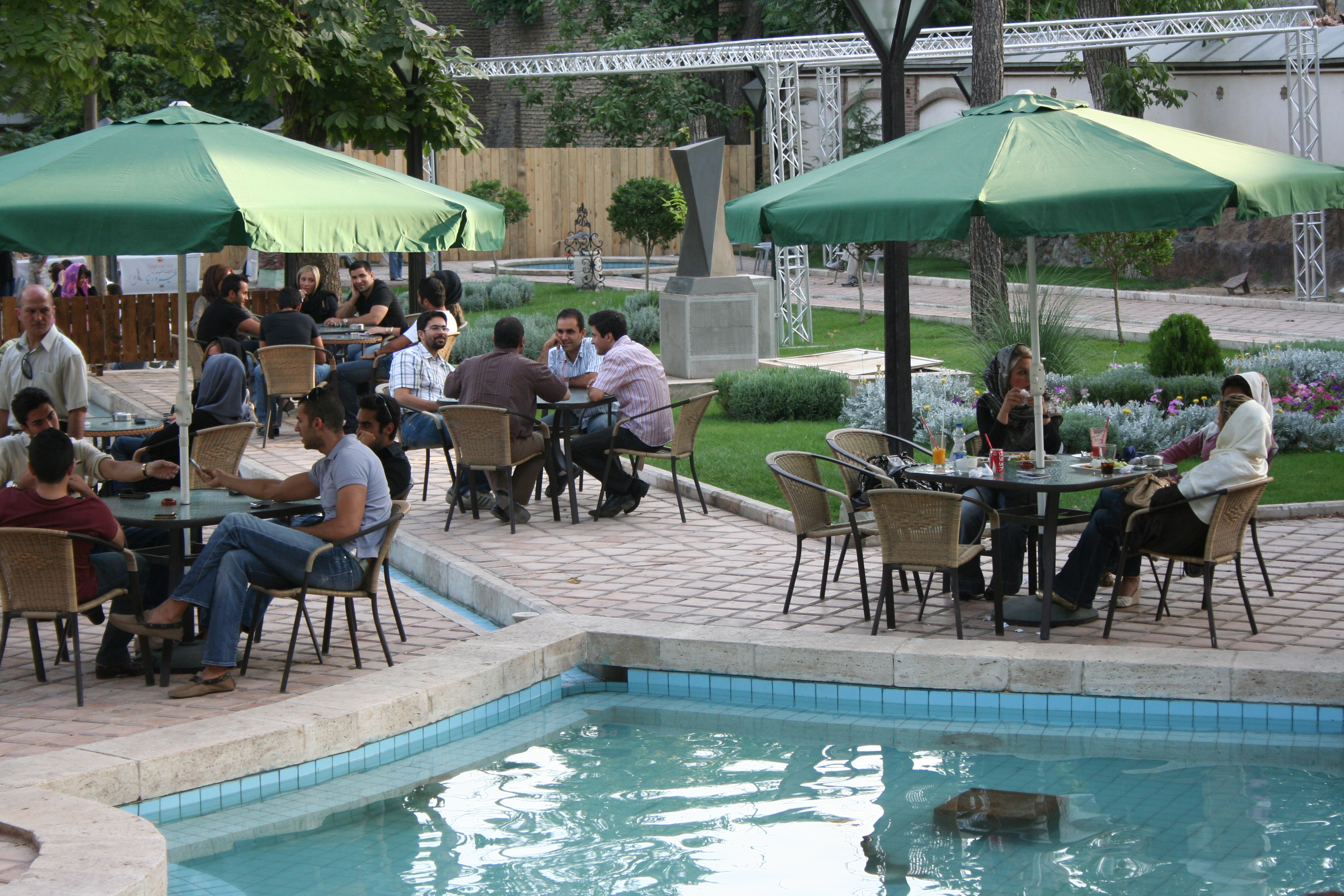
- A traditional cafe in Tehran's Museum Garden
- Type: Hot drink
- Origin: Iran, Middle East
- Introduced: 16th century AD (Safavids)
- Color: Dark brown to black
- Flavor: Strong and aromatic; usually with cardamom or rose water
- Ingredients: Coffee beans, water, sugar, cardamom, rose water (optional)
- Variants: Coffee, Yazdi coffee, espresso drinks
- Related products: Turkish coffee, Arabic coffee, tea in Iran

In recent decades, coffee has spread as part of the urban lifestyle in Iran and has become one of the most popular hot beverages after Iranian tea. The growth of coffee shops, the emergence of barista competitions, and the focus on specialty coffees are signs of this development.

== History ==
The introduction of coffee to Iran dates back to the Safavid era (16th century AD), when trade with the Ottoman and Arab world brought the drink to cities such as Isfahan and Shiraz. During the Qajar dynasty, coffeehouses, which were mainly places for drinking tea, sometimes served coffee as well, but after the spread of black tea, coffee consumption declined. In the 20th century, the establishment of the first modern cafes in Tehran, partly inspired by the spread of European cafe culture, helped coffee regain its place.

== Coffee in modern times ==
In the 1990s and 2000s, with the increase in foreign travel, the growth of international coffee brands, and the expansion of coffee shops in major cities, coffee became a major part of the lifestyle of Iranian youth. Cities such as Tehran, Shiraz, Isfahan, and Mashhad are considered the main centers of coffee consumption and education in Iran.[2] Today, Tehran alone is home to approximately 3,000 coffee shops.

== Coffee culture ==
Coffee culture in Iran varies between traditional and modern styles. While in the south of Iran, especially in Bushehr and Khuzestan, Arabic coffee or bitter coffee with cardamom and saffron is popular, in urban areas European-style coffee (such as espresso, latte, and cappuccino) is served. In recent years, barista competitions and coffee festivals have been held in Iran, and many Iranian baristas have participated in international competitions.

== Economy and supply ==
Iran imports virtually all of its coffee beans, as climatic conditions do not allow for significant large-scale commercial production. Consequently, the local market relies on imports and is sensitive to currency fluctuations and the logistical constraints imposed by international sanctions.

== Media and events ==
Events such as the National Iranian Coffee Festival, the International Coffee and Tea Exhibition, and barista competitions are organized by specialized coffee associations.

== See also ==
- History of coffee
- Coffee culture
- Turkish coffee
- Iranian cuisine
