= Baba Budangiri =

Baba Budan Baba Budan Giri, Syed Budan Shah Khadri, Dada Pahad, Chandradrona, Chandra Drona
- Hill and mountain range
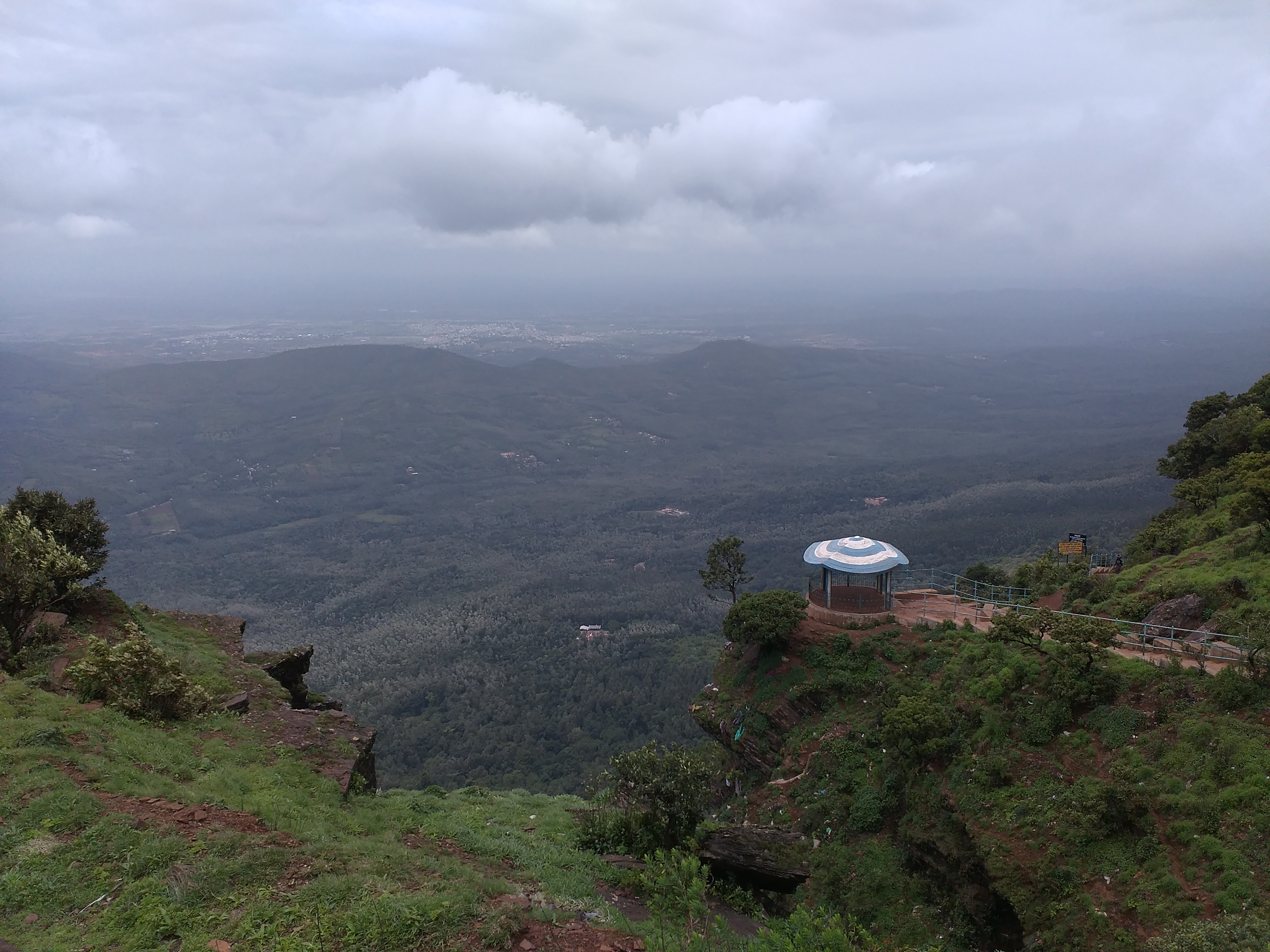
- A view from Baba Budangiri
- Nickname: Coffee land
- Location within Karnataka
- Coordinates: 13.421°N 75.763°E
- Country: India
- State: Karnataka
- District: Chikkamagaluru
- Named for: Baba Budan
- Elevation: 1,895 m (6,217 ft)

Languages
  - Official: Kannada
- Time zone: UTC+5:30 (IST)

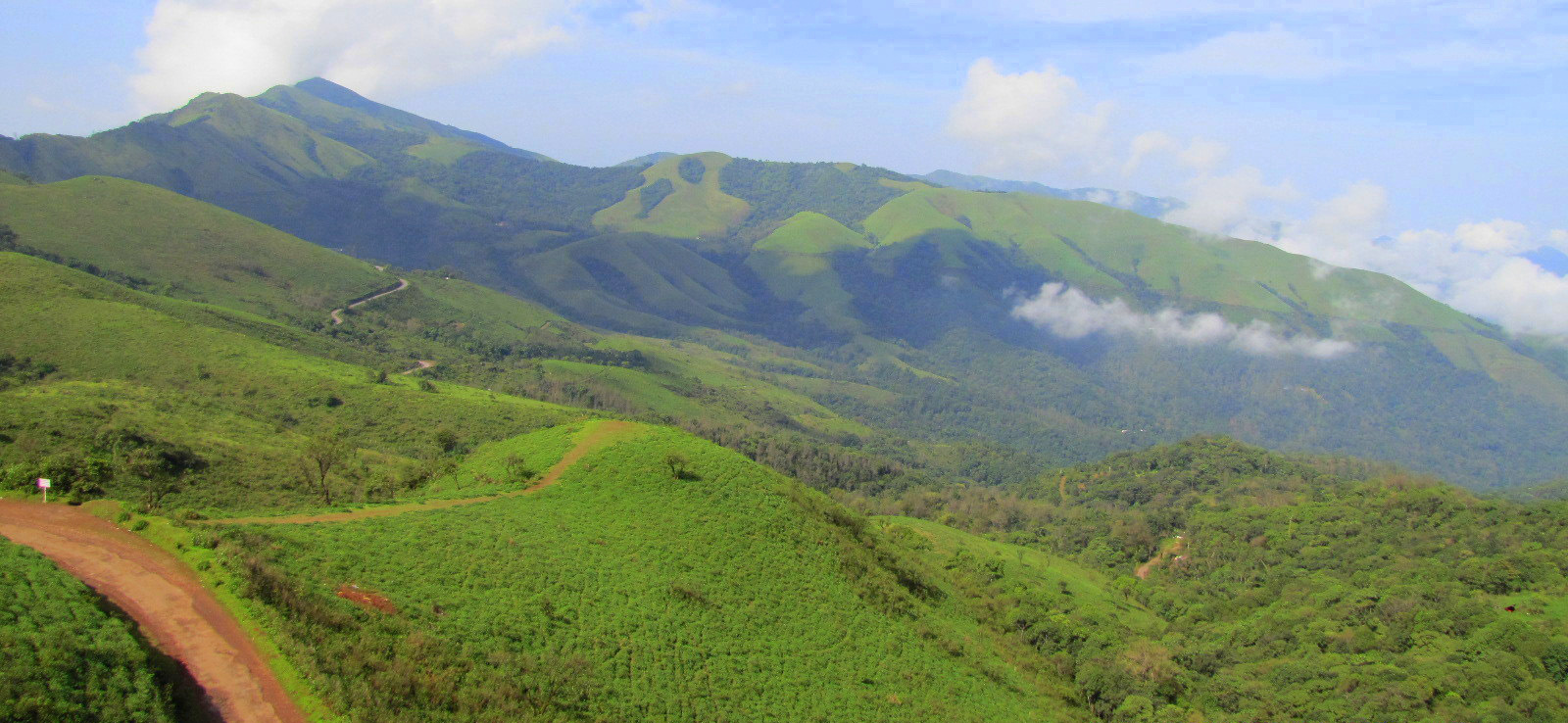
View of Western Ghats of India

Baba Budangiri (lit. 'Baba Budan hill'), also known as Chandradrona (lit. 'Moon guide', as the range naturally forms the shape of a crescent moon), is a hill and mountain range in the Western Ghats of India, located in the Chikkamagaluru district of Karnataka.

The main peaks in this range are the eponymous Baba Budangiri (height 1895 m), Mullayanagiri (1930 m) and others. Mullayanagiri is the highest peak in the range. With a height of 1930 m (6317 ft), it is the fourth highest peak between the Himalayas and the Nilgiris. There is a famous trekking trail between Mullayanagiri and Baba Budangiri.

The Mountain range is known for its extensive coffee plantations, one of the earliest and most extensive in India, said to have been started by the Sufi saint Baba Budan, who is believed to be the first person to have brought coffee from the country of Mokha, Yemen. His shrine, located amongst three caves on the Baba Budangiri still serves as a pilgrimage site for both Hindus and Muslims. Dattatreya Peetha (or Datta Peetha), a Hindu religious place dedicated to the deity Dattatreya, is coextensive with the shrine.

== Dargah and Dattapeeta ==
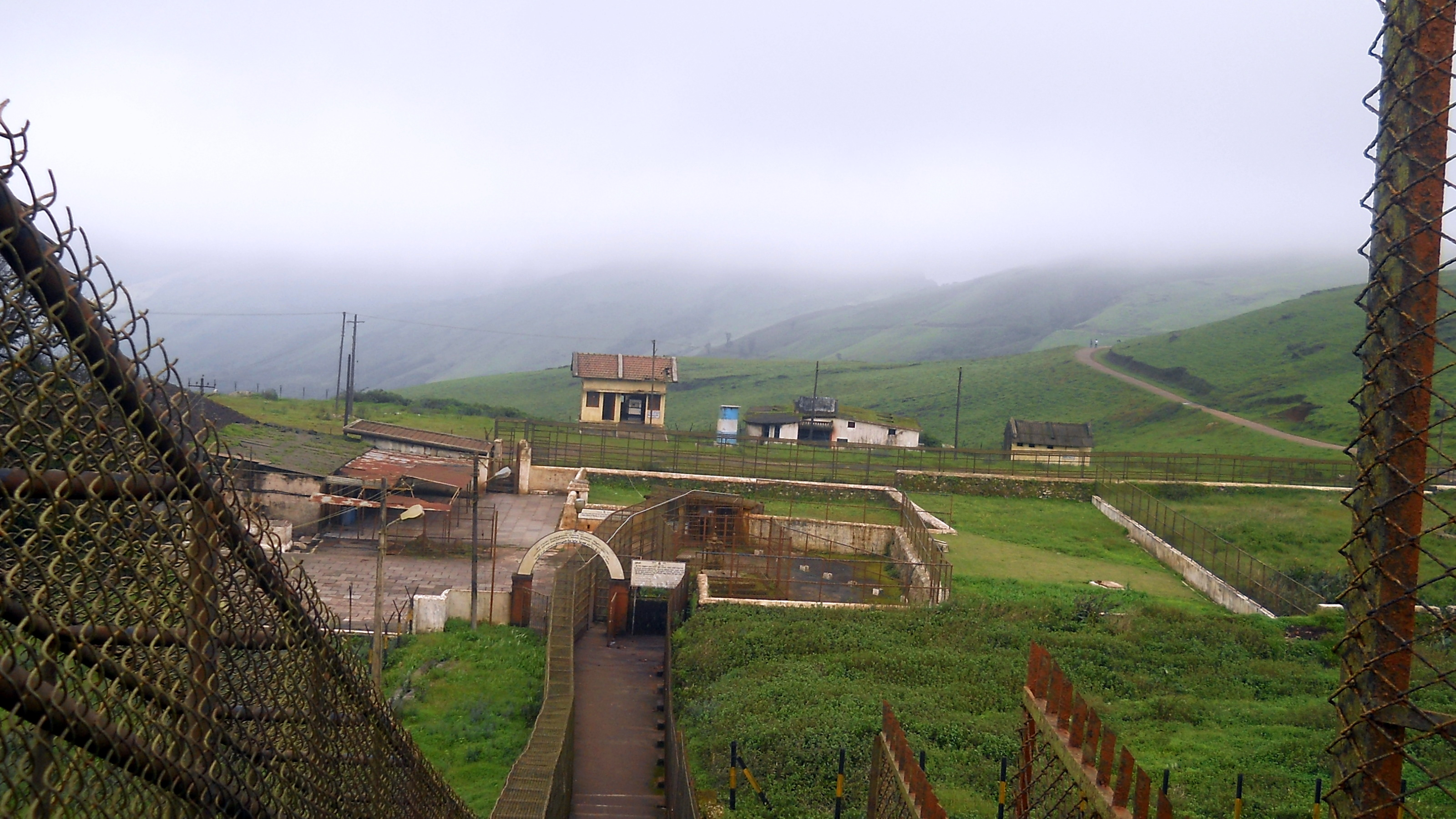
View of Baba Budan Dargah and Datta Peeta

The Baba Budangiri shrine is shrine named after the Sufi saint Baba Budan, who is revered by both Muslims and Hindus. Its origin appears to be a syncretization of reverence for an 11th-century Sufi, Dada Hayath (Abdul Azeez Macci); for the 17th-century Sufi Baba Budan, said to have brought coffee to India; and for Dattatreya, an incarnation of Shiva (or of Brahma, Shiva and Vishnu). It has been controversial due to political and religious tension over its status as a syncretic shrine.

=== Incarnation of Dattatreya ===
The available history says that one Dada Hayath, his real name being Abdul Azeez Macci, considered to be a direct disciple of Muhammad, was sent to India in the 11th century from Saudi Arabia to spread the message of Islam and peace, in true tradition of Sufism. In fact, Dada Hayath's religious preaching did not target Hindus as a religious community. Rather, it targeted local landlords (palegars in local parlance) who were highly oppressive against the common masses. History says that the palegars did not tolerate the intervention of Dada Hayath into their domain, as his mission was about to affect their stronghold and dominance. On many occasions, they tried to eliminate him but failed.

According to some accounts, Dattatreya is a later phenomenon and it could develop a syncretic culture by synthesizing Shaivite, Vaishnavite and Sufi culture together. The people of the region believe that Bababudan is an incarnation of Dattatreya. Having a long history in Karnataka, the Dattatreya tradition – a part of Awadhut tradition, upholds the idea of a formless god, and condemns caste and sacrificial rituals performed by Brahmin priests^{(citation needed)}. Also a long tradition of the Dattatreya and Sufism going hand in hand can be witnessed by the fact that Baba Budan and Dattatreya have become interchangeable.

=== Cave ===
Dattatreya, for whom the shrine was once named, is considered by some Hindus to be God who is an incarnation of the Divine Trinity Brahma, Vishnu and Maheshwara (Shiva), in the form of an ascetic in the discipline of Avadhuutha (God intoxicated monk). A Sufi saint known as Baba Budan is believed to have later been in the same cave for some time. Some Hindus have making a claim over the shrine, which is controlled by Muslims. This has led to tension between the two communities. This has become the place of communal riots on the occasion of Urs (the death anniversary of the Sufi saint) and the occasion of Datta Jayanti in the month of December. Hindu Shobha Yatras have been organized at the same time give rise to the communal conflict.

The Supreme Court of India has ruled that only religious ceremonies which were performed prior to 1975 be permitted. As Shobha Yatra was not performed prior to 1975, police have in some years denied buses permission to approach Bababudangiri on Datta Jayanti.

Baba Budan Giri represents a unique syncretic culture of Hindus and Muslims where both offer prayers in a cave-like structure. It derived its name from a Muslim Sufi saint who was in turn the disciple of another Sufi saint called Dada Hayath Meer Khalandar. Dada was one of the earliest to arrive in India (1005 AD) from west Asia to preach Sufism in India. When he came to south India, he selected the present cave for his meditation. In fact, the Puranic name of the hills was Chandra Dona, as it look like a crescent or a horse shoe. The place Dada selected was equally believed to be the seat of Dattaraya Swamy, who is said to be the last avatar of Vishnu; he is believed to have vanished from one of the caves to Kashi to be reincarnated in future. Another belief is that Dada Khalandar and Dattaraya Swamy are one and the same person. The story goes that after clearing the area Dada decided to settle down for meditation. "He needed water to perform 'wazu' for his prayers. He was a stranger in this area and did not know where water was available. He prayed and started digging the ground in front of the place he had selected as his seat of meditation and found a perennial spring. He thanked god and spent the night in prayers and meditation. Early in the next morning a Brahmin and a jangama entered the cave, as per their custom, for worship. Seeing Dada absorbed in meditation they thought that he was the incarnation of Sri Dattaraya Swamy".

Likewise the Hindus, Muslims also believe that Dada had disappeared from one of the caves to Mecca and Madina and is alive and will in due course appear before the disciples. After him, Baba Budan, one of his closest disciples who introduced coffee to this hilly region, brought from Mokha in the west Asia, carried his mission further. Baba Budan, whose history is usually traced to Baghdad, reached Chickmagalur via Malabar and Mangalore. Baba Budan was killed in an ambush near the present cave and was buried along with two other Sufis inside the cave. He is also called Syed Meran Baba and also Jan-e-Pak Shaheed. The institution of custodian of the site although it is traced to Dada, began to centralise in a single family after the death of another Sufi saint, Syed Shah Jamaluddin. "For reasons not known Jamaluddin also became famous as Baba Budan during his lifetime.". The custodian of the site/shrine is called Sajjade Nishin. There are a few characteristics attached to him: "only Sayyads can become swami, either Husseins or Khadris, the descendents of Hussen or Hassan, sons of Ali. After initiation, a Khadri becomes Shah Khadri, and after apostolic seat, he is styled Sajjade. No unmarried man can become Sajjade".

Sangh parivar organisations started Datta Jayanti celebrations in the late 2000s in the area as part of their fight to claim "Sri Guru Dattatreya Swami Dattapit".

=== Stories ===
A large number of stories have been constructed around Dada's dargah. These stories pertain to the spiritual and healing powers including the power to bestow children, relief to physical disorders, property disputes, etc. This is one of the reasons why the site has become famous. There are stories about how Dada protected a princess who later on came to be known as Sathi Samyukta by Hindus and Mama Jigni by the Muslims. Most important is the story about how the princely state of Mysore was bestowed with an heir to the throne by Dada, and how the maharaja would be able to break the stone laid before the cave. This is a typical story which has similarities with the stories surrounding the birth of Jahangir (with the blessings of Sufi saint Nazrath Shah Sali) and Tippu Sultan (with the blessings of Tippu Aulia of Arcot). This story is important for two obvious reasons: It provided legitimacy to the claims of spiritual power of the Sufi saints, secondly, it made the state liberal, moderate and secular:

Sri Krishna Raja Wadiyar had no son in his family for a long time. He was worried much about it. Once, coming out of the dargah, he saw the stone slab where devotees broke the offered coconuts. Struck with an idea, he made a vow quietly that he would split that stone with coconuts on the birth of a son in the family. Soon after that his brother had a son, Sri Jaya Chamaraja Wadiyar. He came to the dargah with cart-loads of coconuts to fulfil his vow and began breaking coconuts one by one. The stone remained solid even after many cart-loads were finished. He was in a dilemma. He had to fulfil his vow but it appeared impossible. At long last he realised that in his anxiety he made a vow which was apparently impossible. He explained the situation and requested Hazrath Peer to take him to Dada and pray for his pardon and suggest a solution. After Hazrath Peer recited the Fateha, Maharaja expressed his gratitude to Dada, repented his folly, sought out of the dargah and following the instructions, he broke the coconut on the stone slab. To his pleasant surprise the stone developed a crack"

== Nearby places of interest ==
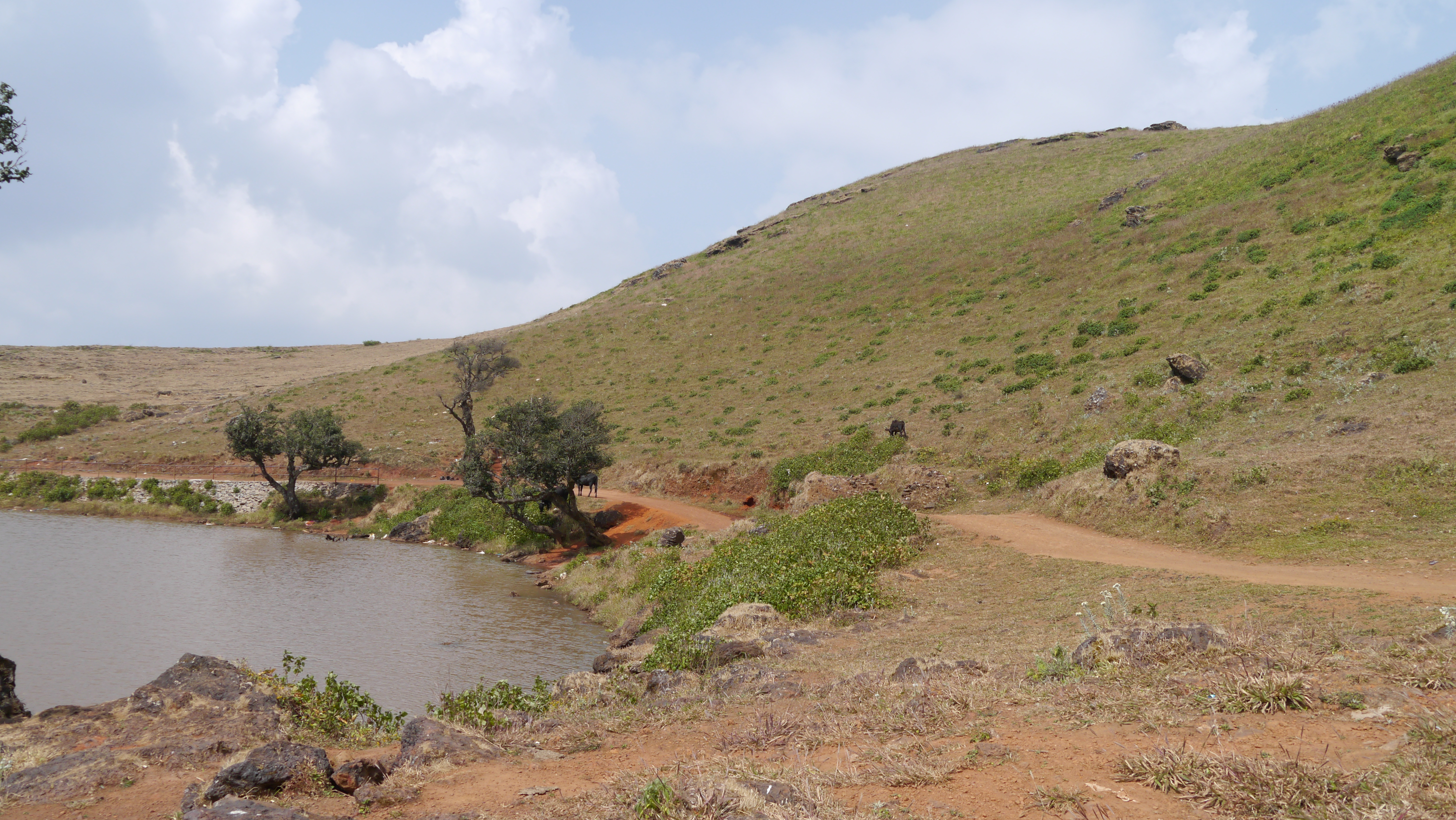
Galikere in the Baba Budangiri range

- Caves: Three large caves said to have been sanctified by three siddhas contain their icons and gaddiges (tombs) and an annual 'jatra' (fair) is held here in their honour. The enthralling scenery makes this a much frequented pilgrim centre.
- Seethala contains a 'matha' and the dual shrine temple of 'Seethala-Mallikarjuna'.
- Waterfalls: A short distance from here are the three waterfalls with epic associations, namely Gada Theertha, Nallikayi Theertha and Kamana Theertha near Attigundi
- Gada Theertha, according to a myth was created by the pandava prince, Bheema with his 'gada', the club, to quench the thirst of his mother during their exile.
- Pilgrims who bathe in the Nellikayi Theertha formed by Manikya Dhara waterfall, leave behind one item of their clothing as per a local belief.
- Galikere is a lake near the temple, can be accessed by walk of 2 km

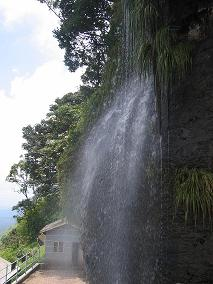
Manikyadhara falls

- Manikyadhara Falls: Manikyadhara Falls is near Kemmangundi of Chikmagalur district. It is on the Baba Budangiri Hills, which is a sacred place for Hindus and Muslims who believe in dead saints. It is one of the main attractions of Baba Budan Giri. It is approximately 40 km from Chickmagalur town and about 5.5 hours from Bangalore.

== Baba Budangiri Range ==
Baba Budangiri Range is a range of mountains in the Western Ghats of Karnataka, India. The range, originally known as Chandra Drona Parvatha, takes its current name from the Dattapeeta Cave and 16th century Sufi saint Baba Budan. The Baba Budan Giri Range includes the highest peaks of Karnataka. Unique mountain flowers called kurinji blooms in these hill ranges once every 12 years. The last time this spectacle happened was in 2006. The next one happened in 2018.

Peaks in the Baba Budan Giri Range include:

- Mullayanagiri (height 1930 m)
- Dattagiri/Baba Budan Giri (height 1895 m)
- Bindagadammanagiri (height 1830 m)
- Sithalaiyyanagiri (height 1810 m)

== See also ==
- Coffee production in India
- History of coffee
- Coffee Board of India
- Chikmagalur
- Kudremukh
- Mangalore
- Mullayanagiri
- Halebeedu
- Brahmagiri (hill), Karnataka
- Kodachadri
- Pushpagiri (mountain)
