= Baba Budan =

17th-century Indian Sufi saint

Baba Budan was a 17th-century Sufi, whose shrine is at Baba Budangiri, Chikkamagalur, Karnataka, India. He is known to have first introduced the coffee plant to India by bringing seven raw beans from the port of Mokha, Yemen, while coming back from hajj in 1670. In those days coffee was exported to other parts of the world in roasted or baked form so that no one could grow their own and were forced to buy from the Yemenis. He brought seven beans because the number 7 is considered sacred in Islam. The coffee plants were then raised at this place that bears his name.

Popular Indian lore says that on a pilgrimage to Mecca in the 17th century Baba Budan, a Sufi saint from Karnataka state, discovered coffee. In his eagerness to grow coffee himself at home, he smuggled seven coffee beans out of the Yemeni port of Mokha which were hidden in his beard. On his return home, he planted the beans on the slopes of the Chandradrona hills in Chikkamagaluru district, Kingdom of Mysore (present day Karnataka). This hill range was later named after him as the Baba Budangiri (Baba Budan Hills), where his tomb can be visited by taking a short trip from Chikmagalur.

== See also ==
- Coffee production in India
- History of coffee
- Coffee Board of India
