= Manada Kadalu =

Indian romantic film

- Theatrical release poster
- Directed by: Yogaraj Bhat
- Written by: Yogaraj Bhat; Gadda Viji; Amol Patil
- Screenplay by: Yogaraj Bhat; Gadda Viji; Amol Patil
- Produced by: E. Krishnappa
- Starring: Sumukha; Rashika Shetty; Rangayana Raghu; Dattanna; Anjali Anish
- Cinematography: Santhosh Rai Pathaje
- Edited by: K. M. Prakash
- Music by: V. Harikrishna
- Production company: E. K. Entertainers
- Distributed by: E. K. Pictures
- Release date: 28 March 2025
- Running time: 154 mins
- Country: India
- Language: Kannada

Manada Kadalu is a 2025 Indian Kannada-language romantic drama film co-written and directed by Yogaraj Bhat, and produced by E. Krishnappa. The film marks the reunion of the director-producer duo after 18 years of their successful film, Mungaru Male (2006). The film stars Sumukha, Rashika Shetty and Anjali Anish in lead roles, along with Rangayana Raghu and Dattanna in key supporting roles.

The film's principal photography began in 2024 in various parts of Karnataka such as Bengaluru, Kodagu and Mangalore and few portions were shot in Maharashtra's Murud-Janjira fort. The musical score and soundtrack for the film is composed by V. Harikrishna and the cinematography and editing were handled by Santhosh Rai Pathaje and K. M. Prakash respectively.

Manada Kadalu was released on 28 March 2025 and received mixed reviews from critics and the audience.

== Premise ==
The film follows Sumukha, a fourth-year MBBS student who loses faith in medical science after witnessing a peon's death from heart attack at his college. He drops out and spends his days wandering the beaches of Karnataka, swimming, and watching sunsets. His life takes a turn when he meets and falls in love with Rashika, a cricketer. He follows her to Bengaluru, where she disappears after asking him to meet her in six months. He looks for her and finds her at an archaeological site with her friend Anjali, an archaeologist. There, he learns that Rashika is terminally ill. The film then follows Sumukha’s efforts to heal her.

== Cast ==
- Sumukha as Sumukha
- Rashika Shetty as Rashika
- Rangayana Raghu
- Dattanna
- Anjali Anish as Anju aka Anjali
- Shivadhwaj
- Nethra Jadhav
- Suraj

== Music ==
The film's original soundtrack consists of four songs composed by V. Harikrishna to the lyrics by Yogaraj Bhat. The single "Horrible 24" was written by Bhat based on his inspiration towards an eccentric character from his childhood village. The audio rights were acquired by D-Beats.

Track listing
No.	Title	Lyrics	Singer(s)	Length
1.	"Hoo Dumbi"	Yogaraj Bhat	Sanjith Hegde	4:40
2.	"Horrible 24"	Yogaraj Bhat	V. Harikrishna, Sanjith Hegde, Prarthana M. A.	4:17
3.	"Naguthalide Naayi Kode"	Yogaraj Bhat	Vijay Prakash, Srilakshmi Belmannu	3:41
4.	"Neeli Neeli Kadalu"	Yogaraj Bhat	Sonu Nigam	3:57
Total length:				17:33

== Reception ==
Manada Kadalu received mixed to positive reviews from critics, with praise for its philosophical depth, Pranati A S from Deccan Herald noted that the film, while a love story, tries to convey too much, leading to a scattered narrative. A Sharadhaa from The New Indian Express appreciated its philosophical undertones but felt it struggled to emotionally connect with the audience. Vivek M V from The Hindu highlighted Yogaraj Bhat's collaboration with V. Harikrishna, marking it as a notable aspect of the film. Swaroop Kodur from The News Minute described the film as a slow but sure return to form for Bhat, emphasizing its romantic elements. The Times of India review by TNN stated that Yogaraj Bhat recreated his signature magic, but only partially, citing inconsistencies in the storytelling. Shashiprasad S M from Times Now compared it to Bhat's earlier work Mungaru Male, noting that while not as impactful, it reached a philosophical depth. Y Maheswara Reddy from Bangalore Mirror described the film as capturing the "tide and ebb of life," appreciating its thematic exploration. Avinash G Ram from Vijaya Karnataka lauded the performances of Sumukha, Rashika and Anjali, crediting Bhat for introducing fresh talent.
