= Shobha Yatra =

2018 Indian play

- Genre: Satirical drama
- Written by: Shafaat Khan
- Directed by: Attar Singh Saini; Ganesh Yadav
- Starring: Chirag Vohra; Ayaz Khan; Nikhil Ratnaparkhi; Anand Alkunte; Sumukha; Mansi Multani
- Country of origin: India
- Original language: Hindi

Production
- Producer: Zee Theatre
- Running time: 104 minutes

Original release
- Network: Zee Theatre
- Release: 15 August 2018

Shobha Yatra (also spelled Shobhayatra) is an Indian satirical play written by Shafaat Khan. The play examines themes of political corruption, declining social values, consumerism, and the contrast between the ideals of India's freedom movement and contemporary public life. It has been staged in multiple languages, including Marathi, Hindi, Bengali, and English, and has been adapted for film and television.

== Plot ==
Set during preparations for an Independence Day procession, the play follows a group of ordinary individuals assembled by associates of a local gangster to portray prominent figures of the Indian freedom movement. Dressed as leaders such as Mahatma Gandhi, Jawaharlal Nehru, Subhas Chandra Bose, Bal Gangadhar Tilak and Rani Lakshmibai, the participants wait for a ceremonial parade to begin. As the wait grows longer, the characters' personal histories and moral failings gradually emerge. Despite portraying revered national icons, they are shown to be self-serving, corrupt, opportunistic or disillusioned. Through their interactions, the play contrasts the sacrifices associated with the freedom struggle with contemporary social and political realities. The narrative combines humour, satire and political commentary to explore the perceived erosion of public ideals in modern India.

== Cast ==
- Chirag Vohra as Mahatma Gandhi
- Ayaz Khan as Jawaharlal Nehru
- Nikhil Ratnaparkhi as Subhas Chandra Bose
- Anand Alkunte as Lokmanya Bal Gangadhar Tilak
- Sumukha as Babu Genu
- Mansi Multani as Rani Lakshmibai

== Themes ==
Shobha Yatra addresses themes including corruption, violence, consumerism, political opportunism and the loss of idealism in post-independence India. Critics have noted that the play uses historical symbolism and satire to examine the distance between the values associated with the freedom movement and contemporary society. The play's premise of morally compromised individuals portraying national heroes has been described as a critique of public hypocrisy and the commercialization of patriotic symbolism.

== Reception ==
Shobha Yatra received positive critical attention for its satirical treatment of social and political issues. Reviewing the Zee Theatre adaptation, Deepa Gahlot wrote that the play "still retains its satirical bite" and described it as humorous and thought-provoking despite being written decades earlier. The Times of India reported that the play was notable for its commentary on corruption, violence, consumerism and the decline of idealism in contemporary society. Writing in Hindustan Times, Rashmi Uday Singh described the play as a "tour de force" and highlighted its use of satire to examine contemporary political and social values through characters portraying figures from India's freedom movement.

== Adaptations ==
The play was adapted into the Hindi feature film Shobhayatra, directed by Vijay Ghatge.

A separate Hindi-language Zee Theatre adaptation directed by Ganesh Yadav was later released on digital platforms.
