= Yazdi coffee =

Coffee brewing method without filters

Yazdi Coffee (Persian: قهوه یزدی), also known as Qahveh-ye Rouze’i (قهوه روضه‌ای) or Qahveh-ye Azadari (قهوه عزاداری) in Yazd, Iran, is a traditional coffee associated with mourning ceremonies, particularly during the Islamic month of Muharram. Historical evidence suggests that this coffee has been prepared and served to mourners in Yazd since at least the Qajar era.

== Historical Background ==
In the Arab world, coffee was typically roasted with spices such as ginger, cinnamon, and cardamom and consumed without sugar. In Iran, different regions developed their own variations based on local tastes.

According to the Encyclopaedia Iranica, the earliest documented reference to coffee in Iran appears in the writings of Emad al-Din Mahmoud ibn Masoud Shirazi, a Persian physician, in 1537 CE. Ottoman records indicate that coffee was introduced in the empire around the same time, suggesting a parallel timeline for its introduction in Iran.

Serving coffee at mourning and funeral ceremonies has long been customary in the Middle East. In Iran, it became known as Qahveh-ye Tarhim (قهوه ترحیم; lit. Condolence Coffee), which closely resembled Turkish coffee but was infused with rosewater and rock candy. Yazdi Coffee, uniquely developed over centuries to match local tastes, remains a distinctive variation within this tradition.

=== Zoroastrian Influence ===
Researcher Seyed Mahmoud Najafian suggests that the practice of distributing coffee at mourning ceremonies in Yazd may have Zoroastrian origins. He notes that the term Porsseh (پُرسه), meaning a funeral gathering, was borrowed from Zoroastrian customs into Muslim mourning traditions in Yazd. Similarly, the tradition of serving coffee may have been adapted from Zoroastrian rituals.

Oral traditions trace Yazdi Coffee back to the Safavid era, but the earliest written documentation dates to 1832 CE in the waqf (endowment) document of the Imam Hosseini House in Yazd. This house continues to serve Yazdi Coffee today, adhering to traditional preparation methods established over two centuries ago.

=== Cultural and Religious Significance ===
In contemporary Yazd, Yazdi Coffee is served in various Takyehs and Husayniyyas (religious gathering places) during Muharram. However, the preparation at the Imam Hosseini House is considered the most authentic, as it has remained unchanged for two centuries. Traditionally, the coffee is distributed by a servant performing ablution, often accompanied by Yazdi cake.

=== Recognition as Intangible Cultural Heritage ===
In July 2019, Yazdi Coffee was officially registered as part of Iran’s National Intangible Cultural Heritage. The decision was made during the National Conference on Intangible Cultural Heritage in Ardabil, where Yazdi Coffee was recognized under registration number 1893.

== Preparation ==
The traditional preparation of Yazdi Coffee follows a meticulous process maintained for generations at the Imam Hosseini House:

1. Coffee beans are ground using a mill stones and roasted.
2. The ground coffee is dissolved in water in a large copper pot and brought to a vigorous boil.
3. The mixture simmers for approximately 4–6 hours, requiring constant stirring to prevent overflow.
4. Once brewed, a hot coal is added to the coffee, and it is filtered through silk cloth to remove impurities.
5. Sugar is added, and the coffee continues to simmer until it reaches the desired consistency.
6. Just before serving, rosewater and ground cardamom are infused for added aroma and flavor.
7. The coffee is traditionally served in small cups, similar to Turkish coffee cups, often accompanied by Yazdi cake.
