= Physics Teacher (film) =

2022 Indian Kannada language film

- Theatrical release poster
- Directed by: Sumukha
- Written by: Sumukha; Skanda Subramanya
- Starring: Sumukha; Prerana Kambam; Rajesh Nataranga; Mandya Ramesh
- Cinematography: Raghu Gyarahalli
- Edited by: Ajay Kumar
- Music by: Skanda Subramanya
- Production company: Passing Shots Films Pvt. Ltd.
- Release date: 27 May 2022
- Country: India
- Language: Kannada

Physics Teacher is a 2022 Indian Kannada-language philosophical drama film written, directed by, and starring Sumukha, Prerana Kambam, Rajesh Nataranga, Mandya Ramesh. Produced by Passing Shots Films Pvt. Ltd., the film explores the themes of reality versus illusion and was officially selected for the Bangalore International Film Festival (BIFFES).

== Plot ==
The film follows Badri, a reclusive physics teacher whose unwavering belief in science begins to unravel as he confronts profound questions about existence. Isolated and haunted by his past, he embarks on a solitary journey that blurs the lines between reality and illusion. As scientific inquiry gives way to metaphysical exploration, Badri is drawn into a quiet psychological unraveling where logic, memory, and meaning begin to collide.

== Cast ==
- Sumukha as Badri
- Prerana Kambam as Jalaja
- Rajesh Nataranga as Ramaswamy
- Mandya Ramesh as Manju

== Production ==
The film marked Sumukha's directorial debut. It was shot in and around Bengaluru, with a focus on natural lighting and a minimalist visual style that reflected the film's introspective mood. The production aimed for a subtle and realistic aesthetic to enhance the psychological depth of the narrative.

== Soundtrack ==
The film features the track "Manadaalada," which reflects the film's philosophical undertone.

== Reception ==
Physics Teacher received praise for its unconventional narrative and thought-provoking themes. Critics highlighted Sumukha's performance and direction as standout elements. The Times of India critic Sunayana Suresh rated the film 3 out of 5 stars, describing it as "a meditative drama that challenges conventional storytelling," and applauded Sumukha for delivering "a hauntingly restrained performance." Swaroop Kodur of OTTplay rated the film 2.5 out of 5 stars and wrote, "For a film that required an astute eye for pacing and character study, Sumukha's debut is a tad underwhelming. The film certainly promises an original and interesting take on the subjects of spirituality and science through the lens of a genre like the psychological thriller but it also warranted inherent energy and the skill to build a smacking narrative."
