= History of coffee =

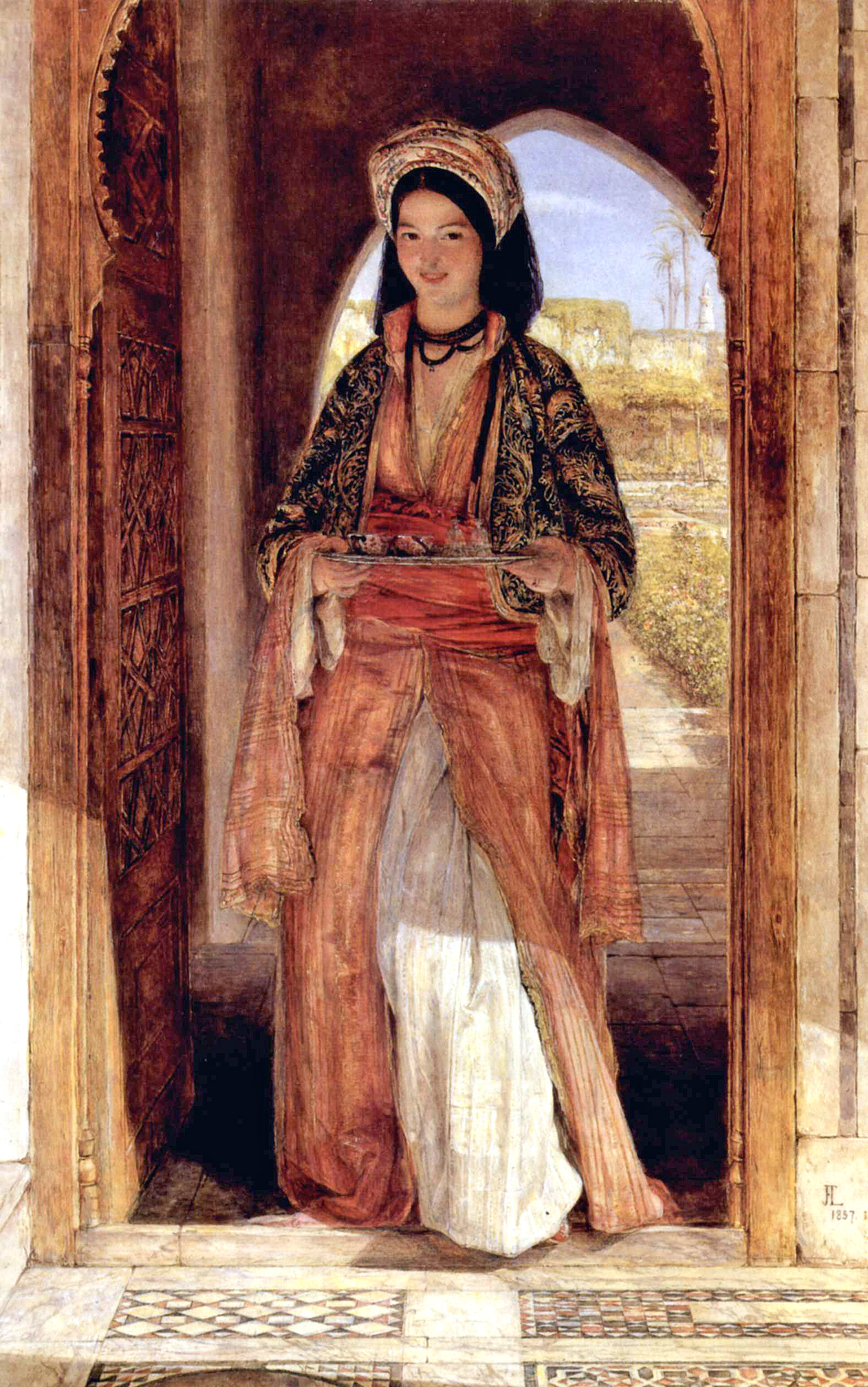
The Coffee Bearer by John Frederick Lewis (1857)

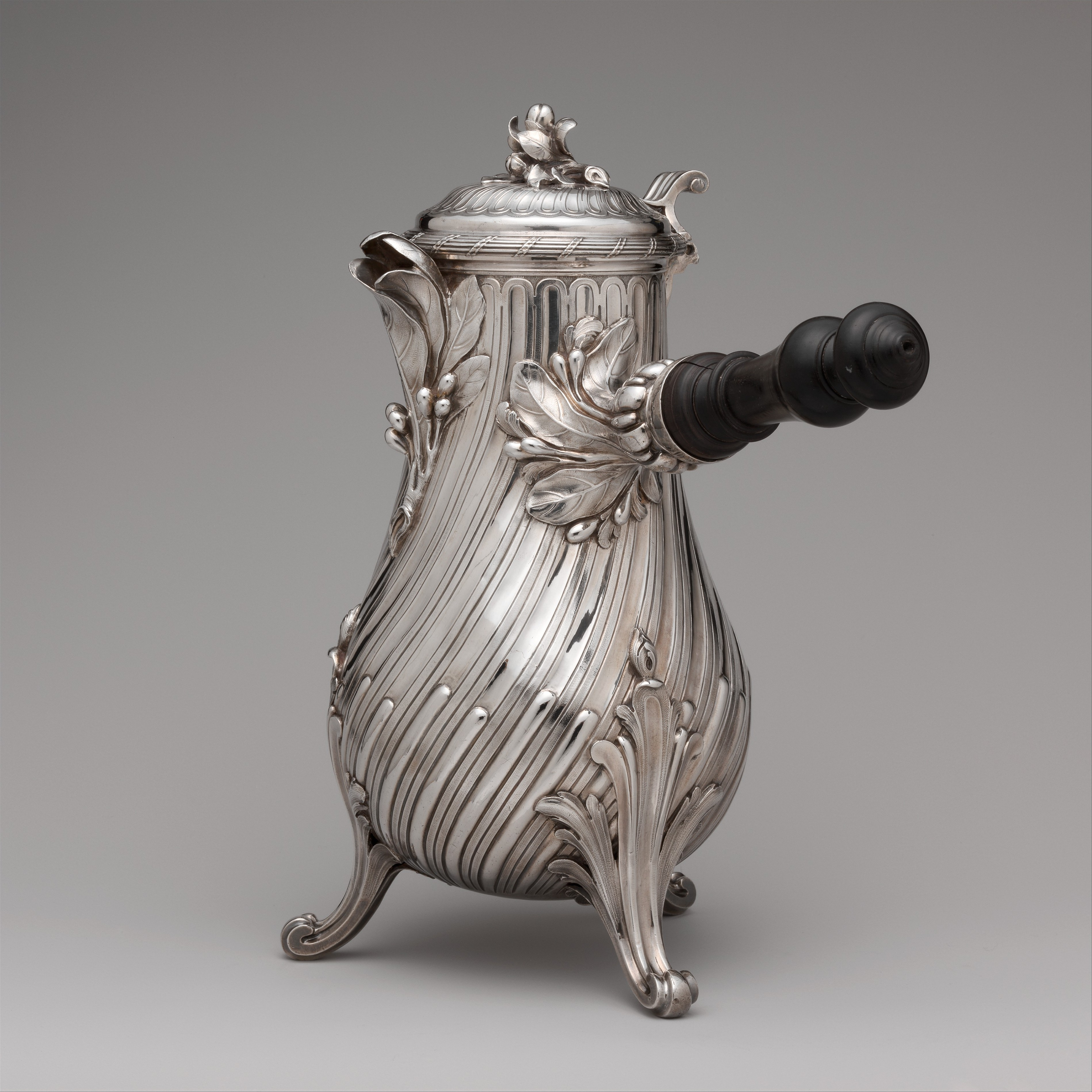
Coffeepot, by French silversmith François-Thomas Germain, 1757, silver with ebony handle, Metropolitan Museum of Art

The history of coffee spans many centuries. Wild coffee plants originated in Ethiopia, while the beverage itself has its roots in Yemen, where it was harvested, roasted, and brewed; Sufi Muslims in the 15th century used it to aid concentration during night prayers. By the mid-15th century, Sufi monks in Yemen regularly made & drank coffee to help them stay awake during long night prayers and religious ceremonies. As traders and pilgrims traveled through the region, this practice quickly spread from Yemen to Mecca and other cities across the Middle East.

From Yemen, coffee spread to Mecca and the wider Arabian Peninsula, and by the early 16th century it had reached Cairo, Damascus, and Istanbul. Debates over its permissibility arose in Muslim society, but it soon became a central part of urban social life.

Through Mediterranean trade routes, coffee entered Europe in the mid-16th century through Italy and other Mediterranean regions. Coffee houses were established in Western Europe by the late 17th century, especially in Holland, England, and Germany.

Up to the end of the 17th century, the Yemeni port of Mocha was the world’s sole gateway for coffee, but as demand grew, cultivation spread to other parts of the world. One of the earliest cultivations of coffee in the New World was when Gabriel de Clieu brought coffee seedlings to Martinique in 1720, from which it spread to other Caribbean islands such as Saint-Domingue and also to Mexico. By 1788, Saint-Domingue supplied half the world's coffee.

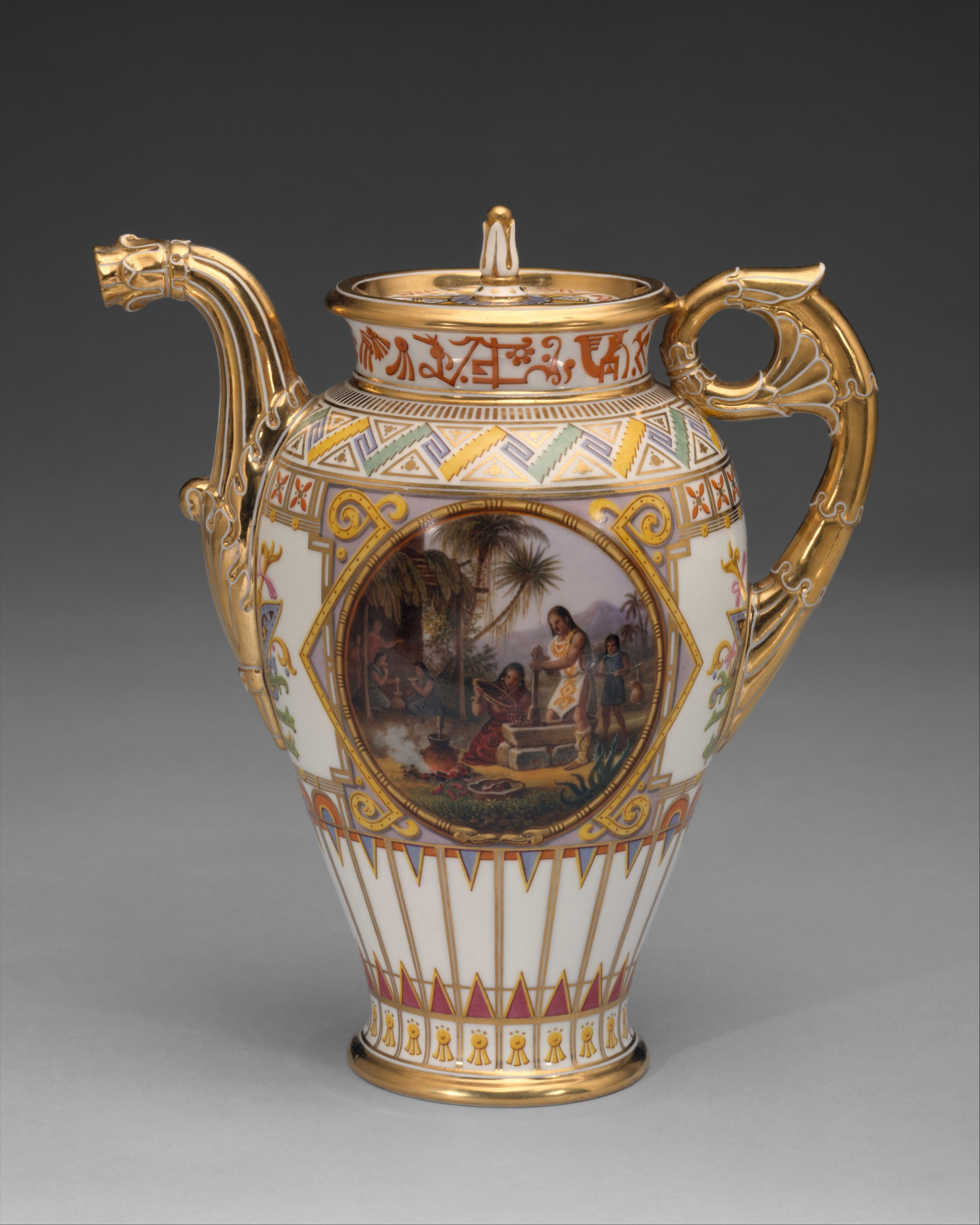
Coffeepot (cafetière "campanienne"), part of a service (1836), hard-paste porcelain, Metropolitan Museum of Art

By 1852, Brazil became the world's largest producer of coffee and has held that status ever since. Since 1950, several other major producers emerged, notably Colombia, Ivory Coast, Ethiopia, and Vietnam; the latter overtook Colombia and became the second-largest producer in 1999.

Today, coffee is one of the world's most popular beverages, with a significant cultural and economic impact globally.

== Etymology ==
The word coffee entered English from the Ottoman Turkish ḳahve (قهوه), borrowed in turn from the Arabic qahwah (قَهْوَة). Qahwah most likely meant 'dark', referring to the brew or the bean: Semitic languages have the root qhh, "dark colour".

Medieval Arab lexicographers traditionally held that the etymology of qahwah meant 'wine', given its distinctly dark colour, and derived from the verb qahiya (قَهِيَ), 'to have no appetite'. Etymologies include the Ethiopian province of Kaffa in Abyssinia, part of the plant's native region and origin of discovery, and the Arabic quwwa ("power").

The Turkish kahve also inspired caffè in Italian, café in French, and koffie in Dutch, which all emerged at roughly the same time, reflecting the beverage's rapid spread across Europe.

The Ethiopian word for coffee is buna, bun, būn, Buni which comes from the word for the colour brown in Amharic, Tigrinya, and Arabic. The word group has been assumed to originate from early Semitic languages bunn (بن).

The terms coffee pot and coffee break originated in 1705 and 1952 respectively.

== Genetics ==
The original domesticated coffee plant is said to have been from Harar, and the native plant population is thought to be derived from Ethiopia with distinct nearby populations in Sudan and Kenya.

Genetic studies have been performed on Coffea arabica varieties, which were found to be of low genetic diversity but retaining of some residual heterozygosity from ancestral materials, and closely related diploid species Coffea canephora and C. liberica; however, no direct evidence of coffee's existence or use has been found from earlier than the seventeenth century. A 2020 follow-up study definitively confirmed that the vast majority of C. arabica plants originate from early varieties in the coffee farms of Yemen.

== History ==
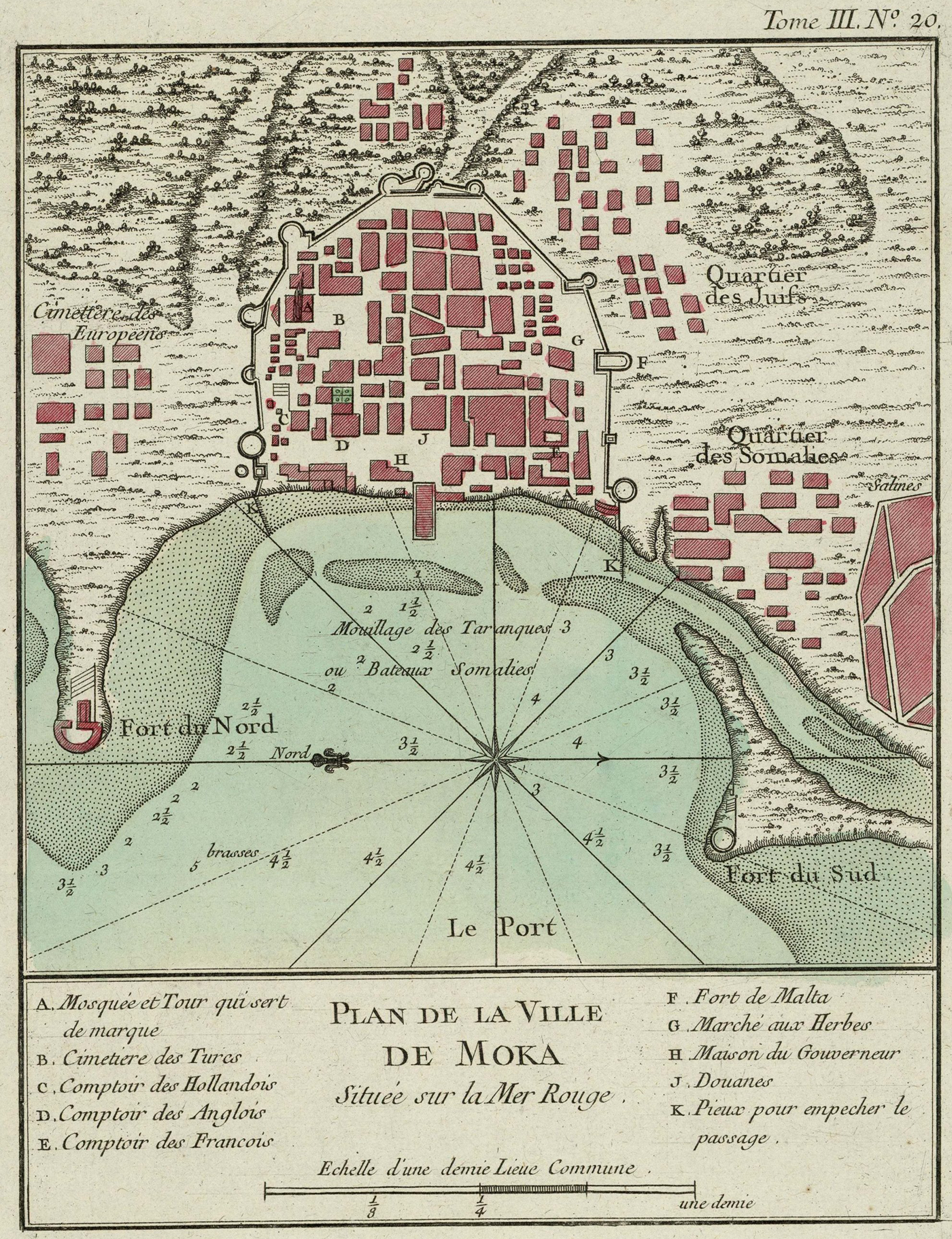
18th century French plan of Mocha, Yemen. The Somali, Jewish, and European quarters are located outside the citadel. The Dutch, English, Turkish, and French trading posts are inside the city walls.

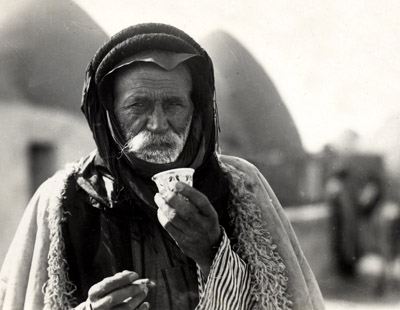
Syrian Bedouin from a beehive village near Aleppo, Syria, sipping the traditional murra (bitter) coffee, 1930

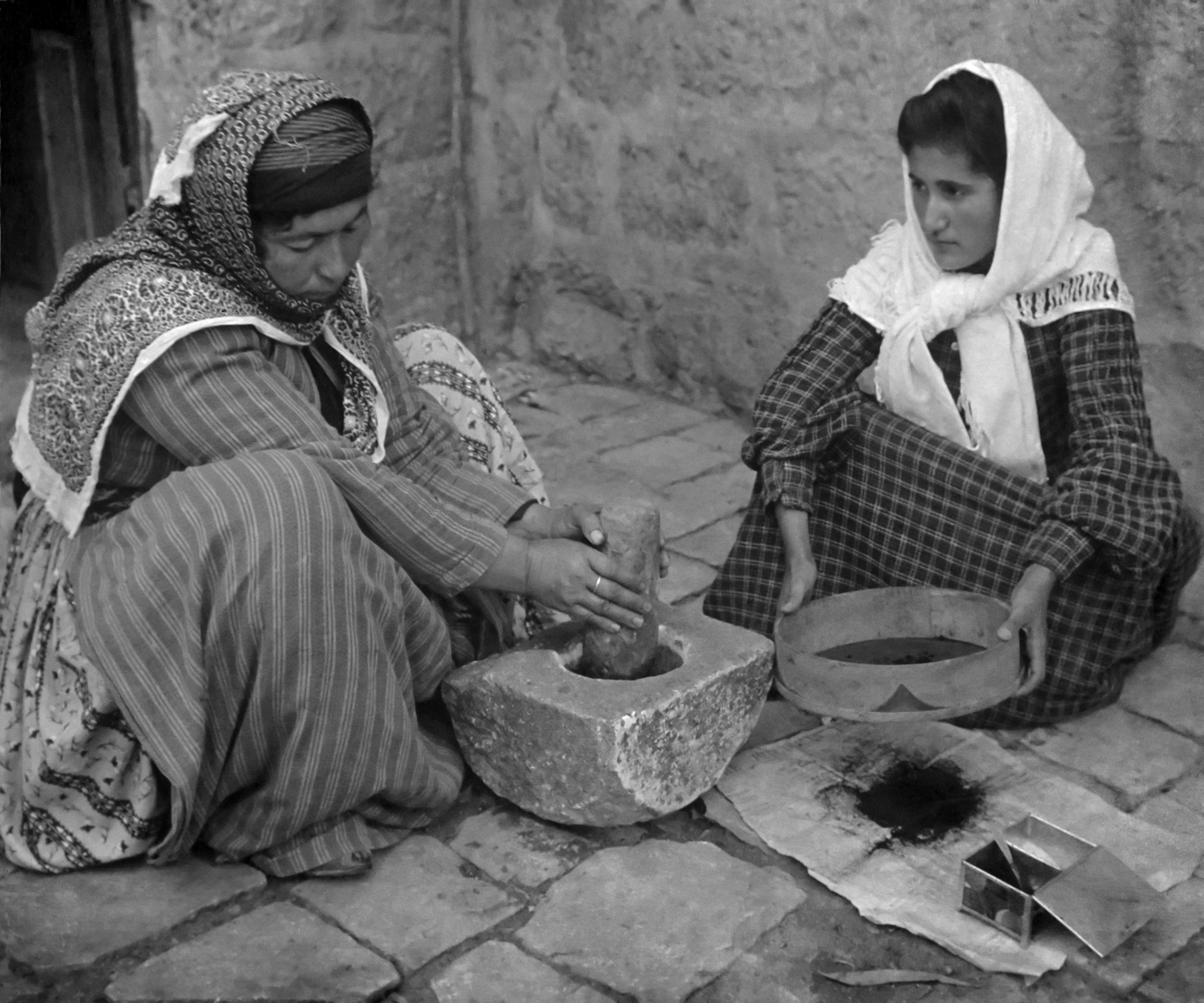
Palestinian women grinding coffee, 1905

=== Spread of coffee ===
The earliest mention of coffee noted by the literary coffee merchant Philippe Sylvestre Dufour is a reference to bunchum in the works of the 10th century Persian physician al-Razi (also internationally Latinised to Rhazes). According to later accounts, bunchum was made from a root rather than from coffee beans. There is no confirmed evidence, either historical or archaeological, of coffee as a drink being consumed before the 15th century. The beverage appears to be a relatively recent development. By the late 15th century, coffee drinking was well established among Sufi communities in Yemen.

More definite information on the coffee tree and preparation of a beverage from the roasted coffee berries dates back to the late 15th century. The Sufi Imam Muhammad Ibn Said al-Dhabhani is known to have imported goods from Ethiopia to Yemen.

One of the most important of the early writers on coffee was Abd al-Qadir al-Jaziri, who, in 1587, compiled a work tracing the history and legal controversies of coffee entitled Umdat al Safwa fi hill al-qahwa (عمدة الصفوة في حل القهوة), tracing the spread of coffee from Arabia Felix (present-day Yemen) northward to Mecca and Medina, and then to the larger cities of Cairo, Damascus, Baghdad, and Constantinople. He reported that one Sheikh, Jamal-al-Din al-Dhabhani (d. 1470), mufti of Aden, was the first to adopt the use of coffee (circa 1454).

He found that among its properties was that it drove away fatigue and lethargy, and brought to the body a certain sprightliness and vigour, aiding in the early work at the time.

Al-Jaziri's manuscript work is of considerable interest with regard to the history of coffee in Europe as well. A copy reached the French royal library, where it was translated in part by Antoine Galland as De l'origine et du progrès du café (1699).

Sufis in Yemen used the beverage as an aid to concentration and as a kind of spiritual intoxication when they chanted the name of God. Sufis used it to keep themselves alert during their nighttime devotions. By 1414, the plant was known in Mecca, and, in the early 1500s, was spreading to the Mamluk Sultanate of Egypt and North Africa from the Yemeni port of Mocha. Associated with Sufism, a myriad of coffee houses popped up in Cairo around the religious Al-Azhar University. These coffee houses also opened in Syria, especially in the cosmopolitan city of Aleppo, and then in Constantinople, the capital of the Ottoman Empire, in 1554. Coffee was also noted in Aleppo by the German physician botanist Leonhard Rauwolf, the first European to mention it, as chaube, in 1573; Rauwolf was closely followed by descriptions from other European travellers. According to the Ottoman chronicler İbrahim Peçevi, coffee reached Istanbul in 1554, when two Arab merchants, Hakem of Aleppo and Shems of Damascus, opened the first coffeehouse in the Tahtakale district of Istanbul.

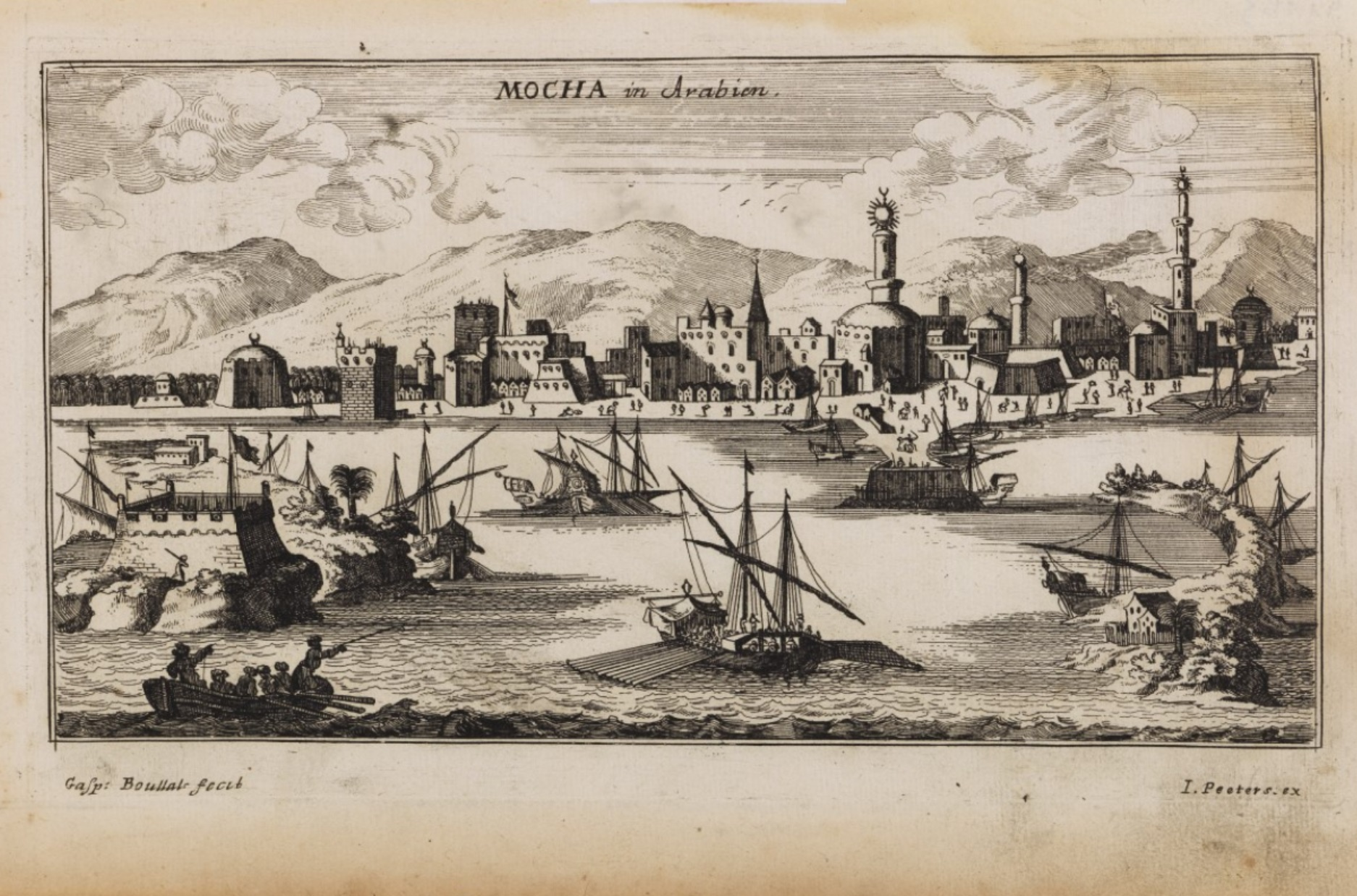
The port city Mocha in Yemen 1692.

In 1511, it was forbidden for its stimulating effect by conservative, orthodox imams at a theological court in Mecca. However, these bans were to be overturned in 1524 by an order of the Ottoman Turkish Sultan Suleiman I, with Grand Mufti Mehmet Ebussuud el-İmadi issuing a fatwa allowing the consumption of coffee. In Cairo, a similar ban was instituted in 1532, and the coffeehouses and warehouses containing coffee beans were sacked. During the 16th century, it had already reached the rest of the Middle East, the Safavid Empire and the Ottoman Empire. From the Middle East, coffee drinking spread to Italy, then to the rest of Europe, and coffee plants were transported by the Dutch to the East Indies and to the Americas.

=== Yemen ===
Yemen is regarded as the origin of the beverage and where Coffea arabica was cultivated as a crop on a large scale rather than gathered from the wild.

Yemen became the first major production zone and global exporter of coffee, dominating the trade for two centuries. By the fifteenth century, coffee cultivation had taken root in Yemen's highland regions such as Haraz and Bani Matar, where it was harvested, roasted, and brewed by Sufi circles seeking to sustain energy during nightly prayers.

By the late sixteenth century, Yemen had established a thriving coffee economy centred in its western highlands. Coffee was cultivated on terraced slopes overlooking the Tihamah, while caravan routes carried the beans to the Red Sea ports, particularly Mocha, which connected the Yemeni trade with Jeddah, Cairo, and beyond. During the seventeenth century, demand for Yemeni coffee grew so rapidly that it rivaled and eventually surpassed many commodities of the global spice trade. Until the end of that century, Yemen remained the world's principal producer and exporter of coffee, and the port of Mocha became synonymous with the beverage itself.

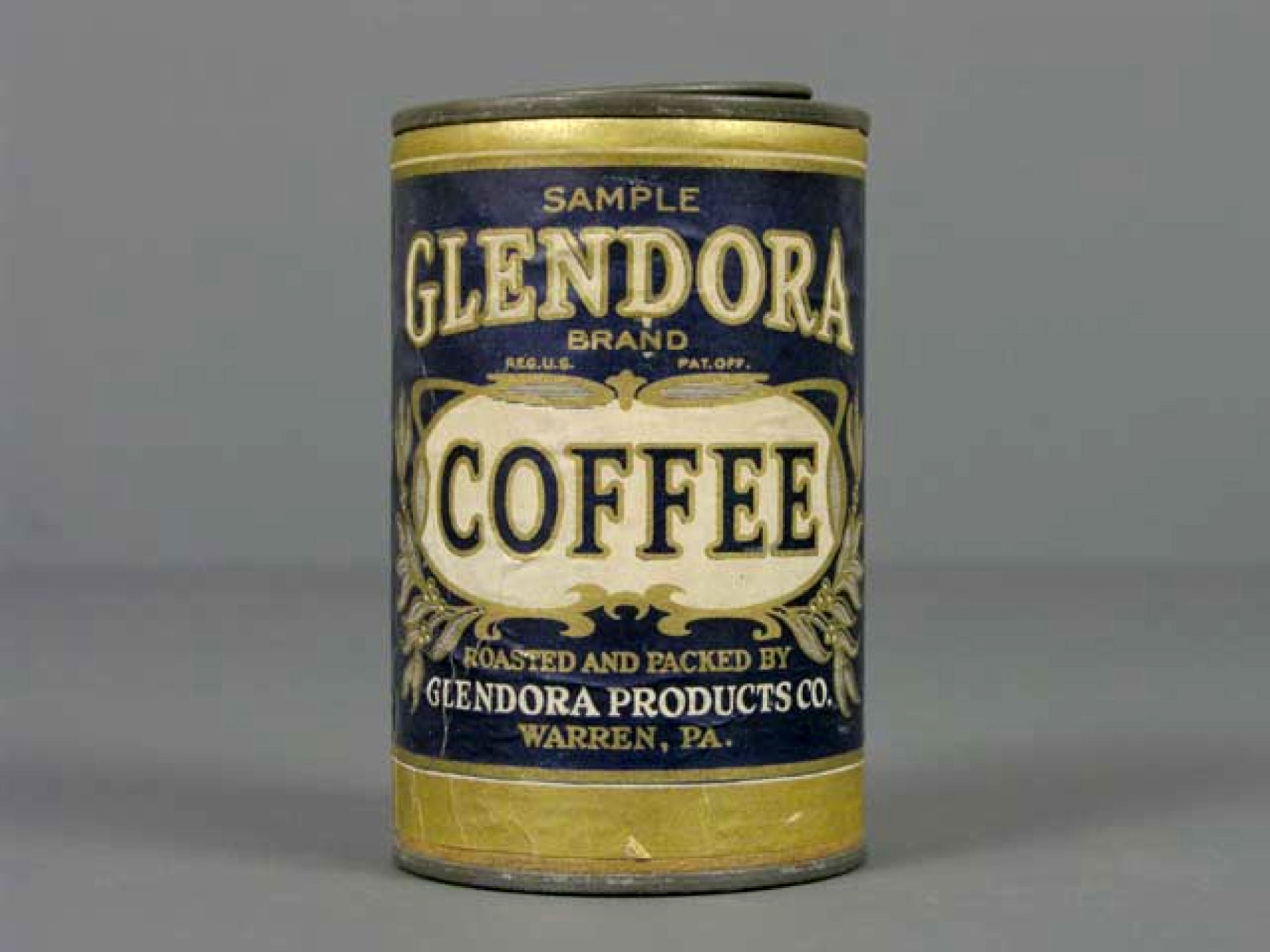
A coffee can from the first half of the 20th century. From the Museo del Objeto del Objeto collection.

Modern genetic studies have confirmed Yemen's foundational role in the global spread of C. arabica. Research published in 2020 demonstrated that a vast majority of the world's cultivated C. arabica varieties were propagated from plants domesticated and farmed in Yemen.

=== Iran ===
Coffee was introduced to Iran during the Safavid era in the 16th century, likely brought by returning pilgrims and merchants from the Arabian Peninsula. The earliest records show that Qahveh khaneh appeared in cities like Isfahan and Tabriz, where people socialised. At the beginning, coffee was first grown in the northern provinces and later spread to other regions, and over time it became a central part of Iranian social life. During the Qajar era, tea gradually replaced coffee as the preferred drink, although coffeehouses remained important cultural spaces.

Coffee played a central role in social life in Iran. Qahveh khaneh became places where people interacted socially, shared stories, read poetry, and discussed political events, which shows the central role of coffee in Iranian social life. Travellers and historians from the Safavid and Qajar periods often mentioned Iranian coffee customs, including how it was prepared and served. Even after tea became more popular, coffee remained a part of city life and continued to influence Iranian culture into the 19th century.

Coffee in Iran also played a role in trade and the economy. During the Safavid period, coffee beans were imported through Persian Gulf ports and sold in urban markets, linking local merchants to wider international trade networks. Coffee not only played a major role in the economy but also influenced cultural aspects. For example, some coffeehouses served as informal spaces for commercial negotiations and the exchange of news and information. The popularity of coffee created new jobs, such as coffee roasters and servers, demonstrating its influence on daily life and employment in Iranian cities.

=== Somalia ===
According to Captain Haines, who was the colonial administrator of Aden (1839–1854), Mocha historically imported up to two-thirds of their coffee from Berbera-based merchants before the coffee trade of Mocha was captured by British-controlled Aden in the 19th century. Thereafter, much of the Ethiopian coffee was exported to Aden via Berbera. England also received two-thirds of its coffee escaping the high duties cost at Mocha.

Berbera not only supplies Aden with horned cattle and sheep to a very large extent, but the trade between Africa and Aden is steadily increasing greatly every year. In the article of coffee alone there is considerable export, and 'Berbera' coffee stands in the Bombay market now before Mocha. The coffee shipped at Berbera comes from far in the interior from Hurrar, Abyssinia, and Kaffa. It will be to the advantage of all that the trade should come to Aden through one port, and Berbera is the only place on the coast there that has a protected port, where vessels can lie in smooth water.

=== Coffee regulation in Ethiopia ===
Coffee was banned by the Ethiopian Orthodox Church sometime before the 18th century. However, in the second half of the 19th century, Ethiopian attitudes softened towards coffee drinking, and its consumption spread rapidly between 1880 and 1886; according to Richard Pankhurst, "this was largely due to Emperor Menelik, who himself drank it, and to Abuna Matewos who did much to dispel the belief of the clergy that it was a Muslim drink."

=== Coffee in Islam ===
Early practitioners of Islamic medicine and science fought against the notion that the effect of coffee was like that of hashish or alcohol, and instead argued the benefits of the drink, which would stimulate the mind while protecting against the allure of alcohol and hashish. Coffeehouses in Mecca, Yemen, and Cairo began to explode in popularity, and they would soon become centers of public life within the sprawling cities of the Islamic Empires. The coffeehouses sometimes acted like the bayt al-Hakima or madrasas, which were centers of Islamic life, arts, and thinking. Neha Verami, from the Folger Shakespeare Library, said that "the history of these coffeehouses offers three connected insights: the emergence of the public sphere, the participation of larger sections of the population in the political lives of the early modern Islamic empires, and the hollowness of the allegations of despotism mounted on 'Oriental' societies by Western onlookers". Coffee became an ingrained piece of Islamic culture for the centuries to come.

The introduction of coffee to the Islamic world led to religious controversy, with occasional bans. This decision most likely came from the idea that like alcohol, coffee had an effect on cognition, albeit different and milder. It is possible that the regulation was implemented in an attempt to limit consumption of other recreational substances such as tobacco and alcohol in the Ottoman and Safavid Empires. Drinking coffee in public places was also scorned. Not only was public consumption seen as taboo, but people would often drink from a communal bowl in a fashion similar to drinking wine. This most likely contributed to the disdain of coffee because its similar style of consumption once again related it to alcohol.

While Suleiman I was still in power, taxes were imposed in an attempt to prevent both bureaucrats and those who were unemployed from consuming coffee. Further attempts occurred during both the reigns of Sultan Selim II in 1567 as well as Sultan Murad III in 1583 whenever those of more modest means began to drink coffee, which included professions ranging from craftsmen to shopkeepers to local soldiers. Despite the attempt to bar people from drinking coffee, the fatwa ultimately failed as coffee did not compare to the effects of alcohol. Coffee was also seen as a mind-altering substance like alcohol which meant that the prohibition was more of a misunderstanding of the substance or an attempt to control consumption based on orthodox beliefs. This back-and-forth scenario falls within the debate of whether coffee is halal or haram. While it certainly proved controversial, coffee continued to be sought out by many.

Within the Ottoman Empire, shops known as taḥmīskhāne in Ottoman Turkish were used to create coffee using the traditional method of roasting and crushing coffee beans in mortars. Coffee houses located in areas such as Mecca were visited by those from all over: Muslims from mosques, those coming from afar to trade and sell, or simple travelers making their way through.

Despite the controversy over coffee, it was one of the keys to the economy around the Red Sea from the mid-15th century to the mid-17th century. The Oromo people of Ethiopia created foods from coffee plants such as bunna qela, made of butter, salt, and roasted beans. A more modern beverage known as qishr in Arabic is made of recycled dried cherry skins that would have normally been discarded after being used to create the beverage buna. These cherry skins would then be used to brew a sort of fruit tea. Qishr or cascara in Spanish is sold by coffee farmers even today.

=== Legendary origins ===
There are several legendary accounts of the origin of the consumption of coffee. According to one legend, ancestors of today's Kafficho people in the Kingdom of Kaffa were the first to recognize the energizing effect of the coffee plant. One account involves a 9th-century Ethiopian or Arab goatherder, Kaldi, who, noticing the energizing effects when his flock nibbled on the bright red berries of a certain bush, chewed on the fruit himself. His exhilaration prompted him to bring the berries to a monk in a nearby Islamic monastery. But the monk disapproved of their use and threw them into the fire, from which an enticing aroma billowed, causing other monks to come and investigate. The roasted beans were quickly raked from the embers, ground up, and dissolved in hot water, yielding the world's first cup of coffee. This legend does not appear before 1671, indicating the story is likely apocryphal, first being related by Antoine Faustus Nairon, a Maronite professor of Oriental languages and author of one of the first printed treatises devoted to coffee, De Saluberrima potione Cahue seu Cafe nuncupata Discurscus (Rome, 1671), which describes a camel or goat herder in the Kingdom of Ayaman, Arabia Felix. The herder is unnamed in the earliest account and the name Kaldi appears to be a later invention in the twentieth century.

Another account involves the 13th century Moroccan Sufi mystic Ghothul Akbar Nooruddin Abu al-Hasan al-Shadhili. When traveling in Ethiopia, the legend goes, he observed birds of unusual vitality feeding on berries, and, upon trying the berries, experienced the same vitality. Yet another attributes the discovery of coffee to Sheikh Abu al-Hasan ash-Shadhili's disciple, Omar. According to the ancient chronicle (preserved in the Abd-Al-Kadir manuscript), Omar, who was known for his ability to cure the sick through prayer, was once banished from Mecca to a desert cave near the Ousab City. Starving, Omar chewed berries from nearby shrubbery, but found them to be too bitter. He tried roasting the beans to improve the flavor, but they became too hard. He then tried boiling them to soften the bean, which resulted in a fragrant brown liquid. After drinking the liquid, Omar was revived and survived for days. As stories of this "miracle drug" reached Mecca, Omar was asked to return and was eventually made a saint.

Nepenthe /nɪˈpɛnθi/ (Ancient Greek: νηπενθές, nēpenthés) is possibly derived from a misunderstanding of coffee in the Homeric cycle. It is mentioned as originating in Egypt. The word nepenthe first appears in the fourth book of Homer's Odyssey:

ἔνθ᾽ αὖτ᾽ ἄλλ᾽ ἐνόησ᾽ Ἑλένη Διὸς ἐκγεγαυῖα:
αὐτίκ᾽ ἄρ᾽ εἰς οἶνον βάλε φάρμακον, ἔνθεν ἔπινον,
νηπενθές τ᾽ ἄχολόν τε, κακῶν ἐπίληθον ἁπάντων.

— Odyssey, Book 4, v. 219–221
Translation:

Then Helen, daughter of Zeus, took other counsel.
Straightway she cast into the wine of which they were drinking a drug
to quiet all pain and strife, and bring forgetfulness of every ill.

Figuratively, nepenthe means "that which chases away sorrow". Literally it means 'not-sorrow' or 'anti-sorrow': νη-, nē-, i.e. "not" (privative prefix), and πενθές, from πένθος, pénthos, i.e. "grief, sorrow, or mourning".

In the Odyssey, νηπενθές φάρμακον: nēpenthés phármakon (i.e. an anti-sorrow drug) is a magical potion given to Helen by Polydamna, the wife of the noble Egyptian Thon.

Coffee was originally consumed in the Islamic world and was directly related to religious practices. For example, coffee helped its consumers fast in the day and stay awake at night, during the Muslim celebration of Ramadan.

It [coffee] became associated with Muhammad's birthday. Indeed, various legends ascribed coffee's origins to Muhammad, who, through the archangel Gabriel, brought it to man to replace the wine which Islam forbade.

== Europe ==
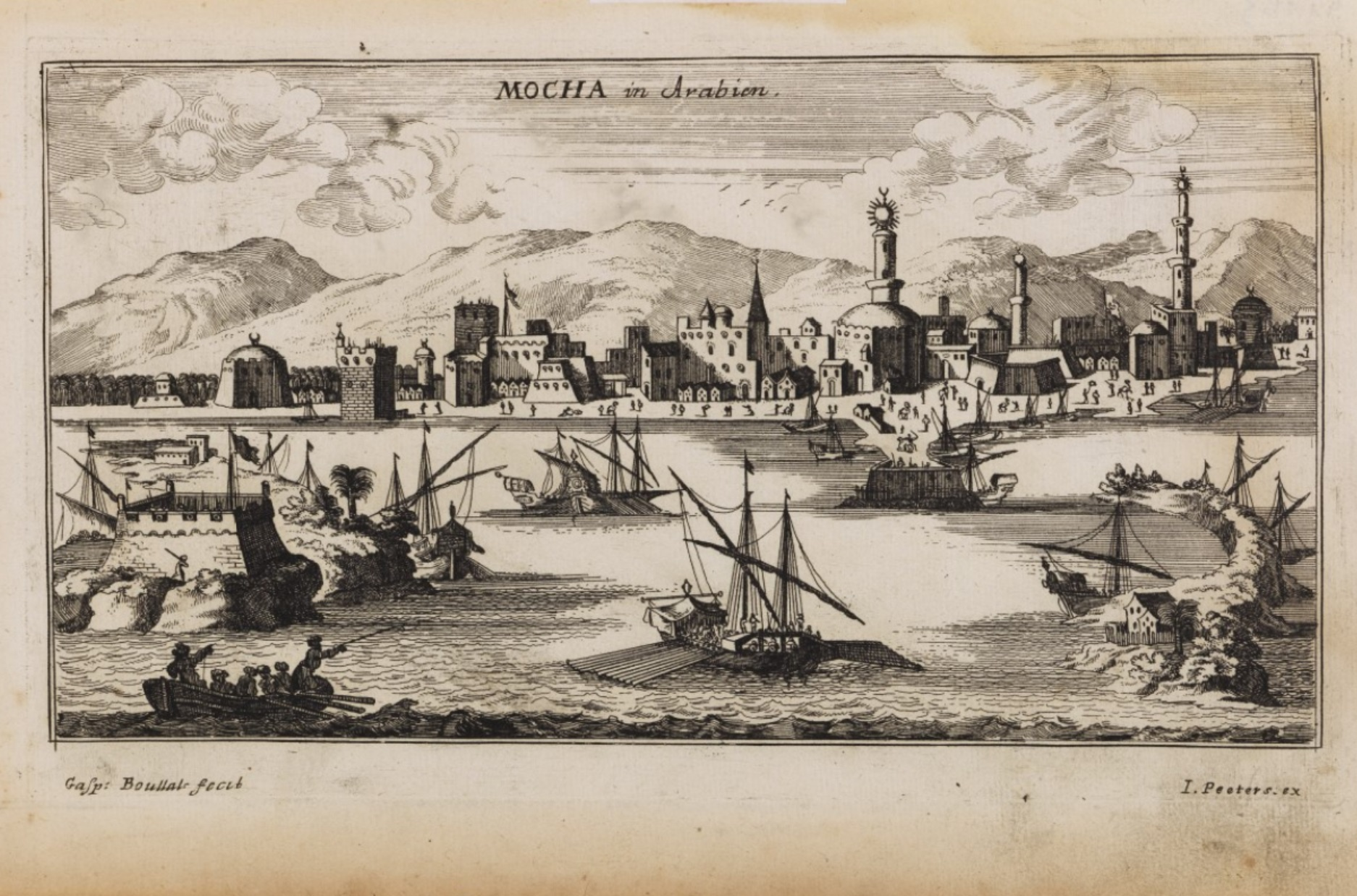
Dutch engraving of Mocha in 1692

In the 16th century, coffee was introduced on the island of Malta through slavery. Turkish Muslim slaves had been imprisoned by the Knights of St John in 1565, the year of the Great Siege of Malta, and prepared their traditional beverage. Domenico Magri mentioned in his work Virtu del Kafé the “Turks, most skillful makers of this concoction.” The German traveller Gustav Sommerfeldt likewise described in 1663 the preparation of coffee by Turkish prisoners. Coffee became popular in Maltese high society and coffee shops were established on the island., the first known mention of which was in 1633, decades before coffee became widely popular in much of Italy.

The first mention of coffee in a European text is in Charles de l'Ecluse's Aromatum et simplicium aliquot medica-mentorum apud Indos nascientum historia from 1575. He learnt of coffee from Alphoncius Pansius in Padua. Englishmen passing through Safavid and the Ottoman Empire in the late 16th century noted that coffee was "very good to help digestion, to quicken the spirits, and to cleanse the blood.”

The vibrant trade between the Republic of Venice and the people of North Africa, Egypt, and the East brought a large variety of African goods, including coffee. Venetian merchants introduced it to the wealthy in Venice, at very high prices. This was coffee's introduction to mainland Europe. In 1591 Venetian botanist-physician Prospero Alpini became the first to publish a description of the coffee plant in Europe. The first mainland European coffeehouse was opened in Venice in 1645.

The first trade route for coffee in Europe was through the Ottoman Empire; later via the port of Mocha in Yemen, from where the East India Trading Company bought and transported large amounts. Coffee was enthusiastically accepted into culture in most of Europe, with royals and the general public all becoming consumers. Whether it be through the term 'coffee arabica' or the transportation of the drink, the passage of coffee into the Western world greatly resembles that of the scientific knowledge and discoveries passed on by the Islamicate Empires.

=== Austria ===
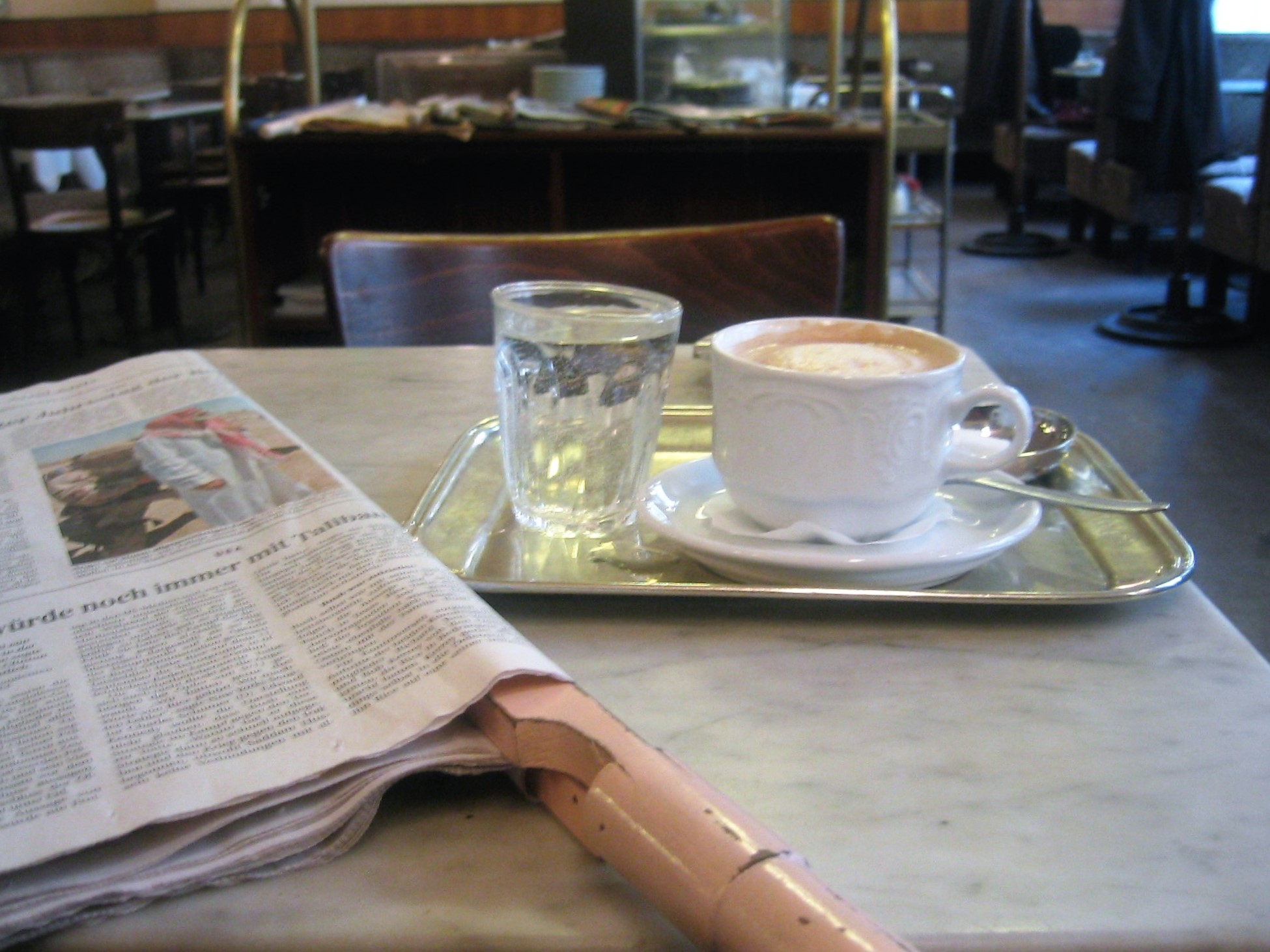
Coffee house culture between Vienna and Trieste: the coffee, the newspaper, the glass of water and the marble tabletop

Coffee was already known in Vienna before the establishment of coffeehouses. In 1685 the Armenian merchant Johannes Diodato received the first documented privilege to serve coffee publicly in the city and opened its first documented coffeehouse. Wiener Melange is the typical Viennese coffee, which comes mixed with hot foamed milk, and is usually served with a glass of water.

A distinct Viennese coffee house culture developed in Vienna in the 19th century and then spread throughout Central Europe. Scientists, artists, intellectuals, bon vivants and their financiers met in this special microcosm of the Viennese coffee houses of the Habsburg Empire. World-famous personalities such as Gustav Klimt, Sigmund Freud, James Joyce, and Egon Schiele were inspired in the Viennese coffeehouse. In this diverse coffee house culture of the multicultural Habsburg Empire, different types of coffee preparation also developed. This is how the world-famous cappuccino from the Viennese Kapuziner coffee developed over the Italian-speaking parts of the northern Italian empire.

=== United Kingdom ===
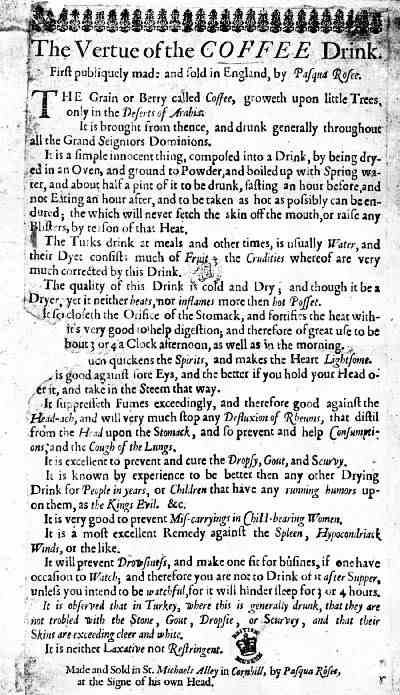
A 1652 handbill advertising coffee for sale in St. Michael's Alley, London

The first coffeehouse in England was opened in Oxford in 1650. The first coffeehouse in London opened in St. Michael's Alley in Cornhill, London. The proprietor was Pasqua Rosée, the servant of Daniel Edwards, a trader in Turkish goods. Edwards imported the coffee and assisted Rosée in setting up the establishment. Coffee was also brought in through the British East India Company and the Dutch East India Company in the 17th century. Oxford's Queen's Lane Coffee House, established in 1654, is still in existence today. By 1675, there were more than 3,000 coffeehouses throughout England, but there were many disruptions in the progressive movement of coffeehouses between the 1660s and 1670s. During the enlightenment, these early English coffee houses became gathering places used for deep religious and political discussions among the populace, since it was a rare opportunity for sober discussion. This practice became so common, and potentially subversive, that Charles II made an attempt to crush coffeehouses in the 1670s.

The banning of women from coffeehouses was not universal (for example, women frequented them in Germany), but it appears to have been commonplace elsewhere in Europe, including in England.

Many in this period believed coffee to have medicinal properties. Renowned and eminent physicians often recommended coffee for medicinal purposes and some prescribed it as a cure for nervous disorders. A 1661 tract entitled "A character of coffee and coffee-houses", written by one "M.P.", lists some of these perceived benefits:

'Tis extolled for drying up the Crudities of the Stomack, and for expelling Fumes out of the Head. Excellent Berry! which can cleanse the English-man's Stomak of Flegm, and expel Giddinesse out of his Head.

This new commodity proved controversial among some subjects, however. For instance, the anonymous 1674 "Women's Petition Against Coffee" declared:

the Excessive Use of that Newfangled, Abominable, Heathenish Liquor called COFFEE ...has...Eunucht our Husbands, and Crippled our more kind Gallants, that they are become as Impotent, as Age.

=== France ===
Antoine Galland (1646–1715) in his aforementioned translation said, "We are indebted to these great [Arab] physicians for introducing coffee to the modern world through their writings, as well as sugar, tea, and chocolate." Regarding this last, he was mistaken, as chocolate had been brought to Europe from the Americas by the Spanish. Galland reported that he was informed by M. de la Croix, an interpreter for King Louis XIV of France, that coffee was brought to Paris by a certain M. Thevenot, who had travelled in the East. On his return in 1657, Thevenot gave beans to friends, one of whom was de la Croix.

In 1669, Soleiman Agha, Ambassador from Sultan Mehmed IV, arrived in Paris with a large quantity of coffee beans. Not only did he provide French and European guests with coffee to drink, but also donated beans to the royal court. Between July 1669 and May 1670, the Ambassador managed to firmly establish the custom of drinking coffee among Parisians.

=== Germany ===
In Germany, coffeehouses were first established in North Sea ports, including Wuppertal-Ronsdorf (1673) and Hamburg (1677). Initially, this new beverage was written in the English form coffee, but, during the 1700s, the Germans gradually adopted the French word café, then slowly changed the spelling to Kaffee, which is the present word. In the 18th century, the popularity of coffee gradually spread around the German lands and was taken up by the ruling classes. Coffee was served at the court of the Great Elector, Frederick William of Brandenburg, as early as 1675, but Berlin's first public coffeehouse did not open until 1721.

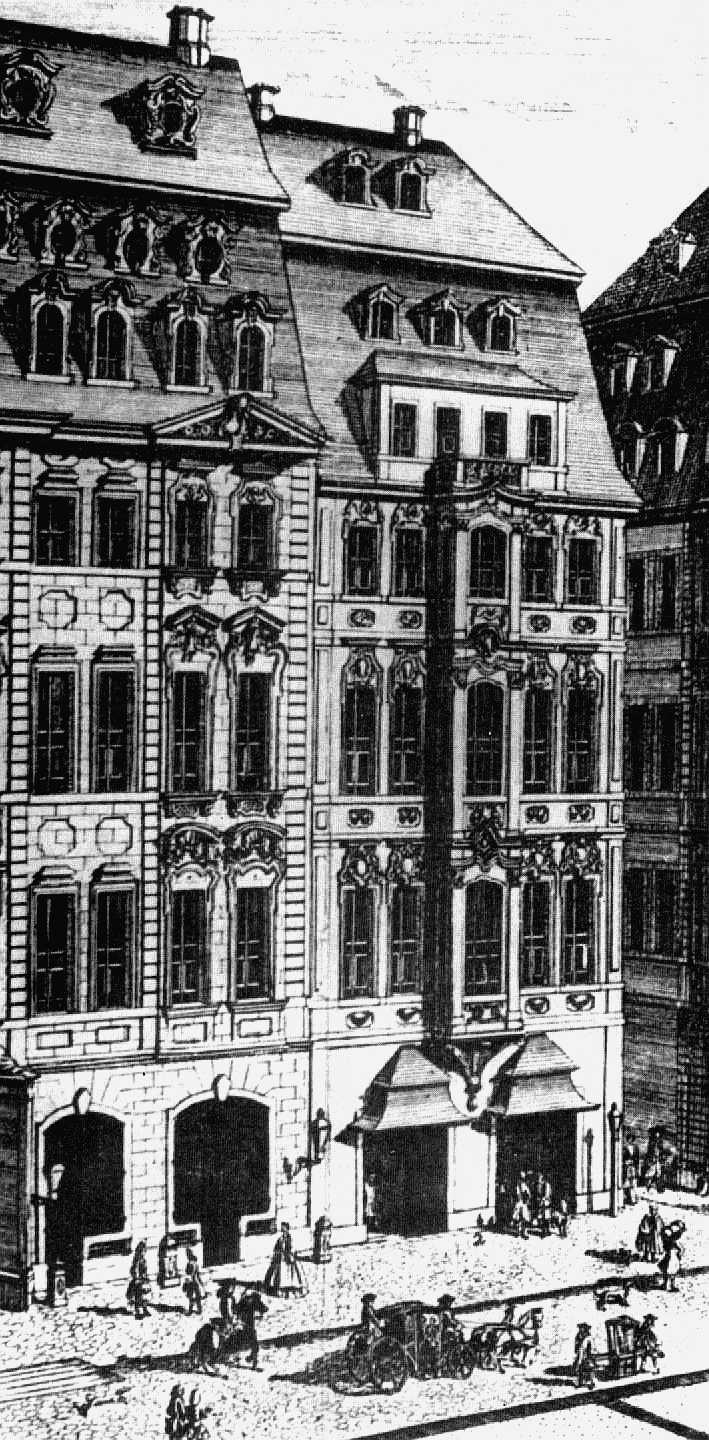
Café Zimmermann, Leipzig (engraving by Johann Georg Schreiber, 1732)

Composer Johann Sebastian Bach, who was cantor of St. Thomas Church in Leipzig, in 1723–1750, conducted a musical ensemble at the local Café Zimmermann. Sometime in 1732–1735, he composed the secular "Coffee Cantata" Schweigt stille, plaudert nicht (BWV 211), in which a young woman, Lieschen, pleads with her disapproving father to accept her devotion to drinking coffee, then a newfangled fashion. The libretto includes such lines as:

Ei! wie schmeckt der Coffee süße,
Lieblicher als tausend Küsse,
Milder als Muskatenwein.
Coffee, Coffee muss ich haben,
Und wenn jemand mich will laben,
Ach, so schenkt mir Coffee ein!

(Oh! How sweet coffee does taste,
Better than a thousand kisses,
Milder than muscat wine.
Coffee, coffee, I've got to have it,
And if someone wants to perk me up, *
Oh, just give me a cup of coffee!)

=== Italy ===
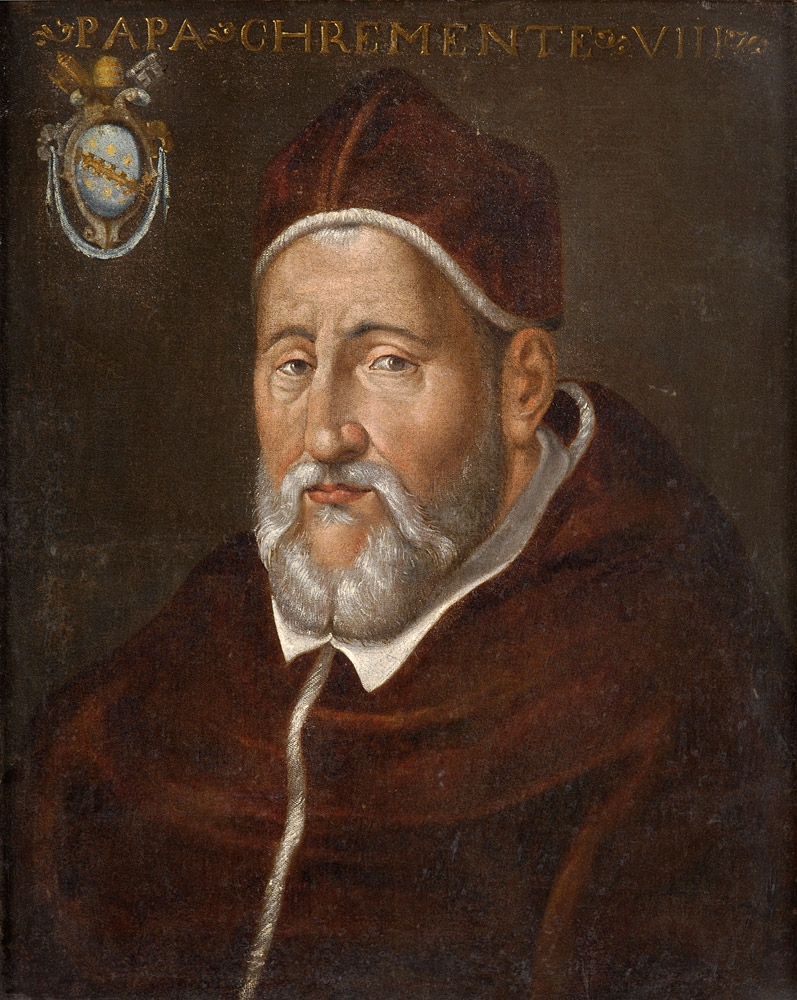
Pope Clement VIII, who popularised coffee in Europe among Christians

In Italy, as in most of Europe, coffee arrived in the second half of the 16th century through the commercial routes of the Mediterranean Sea. In 1580 the Venetian botanist and physician Prospero Alpini imported coffee into the Republic of Venice from Egypt, and soon coffee shops started opening one by one. Coffee spread and became the drink of intellectuals, of social gatherings, even of lovers, as plates of chocolate and coffee were considered a romantic gift. By the year 1763 Venice alone had more than 200 coffee shops, and the health benefits were celebrated. Some in the Catholic Church opposed coffee at first, believing it to be the "Devil's drink", but Pope Clement VIII, after trying it himself, gave it his blessing, boosting further its success and spread. He declared: "Why, this Satan's drink is so delicious that it would be a pity to let the infidels have exclusive use of it." Clement allegedly blessed the bean because it seemed better for people than alcoholic beverages. The year often cited is 1600. It is not clear whether this is a true story, but it may have been found amusing at the time.

In Turin, in 1933, Italian engineer Luigi di Ponti invented the first moka pot and subsequently sold the patent to Alfonso Bialetti. In 1946, Alfonso's son Renato started industrial production, selling millions of moka pots in one year, versus only 70,000 sold by his father in the previous ten, making the coffee maker (as well as coffee itself) an icon of Italy in the world. Coffee became established in Naples later. Some accounts associate its arrival with Mediterranean maritime trade through Sicily and Malta, while other traditions connect the early knowledge of the beverage in Naples with Pietro Della Valle, who wrote about kahve during his travels in the Middle East in the early 17th century.

The technological development that led to modern espresso was primarily in northern Italy. Angelo Moriondo of Turin patented a precursor to the espresso machine in 1884, while Milanese inventor Luigi Bezzera developed a machine for preparing individual servings of coffee at the beginning of the 20th century.

Some believe coffee arrived in Naples earlier, from Salerno and its Schola Medica Salernitana, where the plant came to be used as medicine in the 14th and 15th centuries. Coffee subsequently acquired considerable social and cultural importance in Naples. One preparation method strongly associated with the Neapolitan tradition uses the cuccumella. Despite its association with Naples, the coffee maker itself was of French origin, having been invented in Paris by Morize in 1819; its use later became a distinctive part of Neapolitan coffee culture. Neapolitan artisans came in touch with it when brought, again through the sea commercial routes, to the Port of Naples. One Neapolitan practice is the suspended coffee (the act of paying in advance for a coffee to be consumed by the next customer) originating there and defined by the Neapolitan philosopher and writer Luciano De Crescenzo as coffee "given by an individual to mankind".

=== Netherlands ===
The race among Europeans to obtain live coffee trees or beans was eventually won by the Dutch in 1616. Pieter van den Broecke, a Dutch merchant, obtained some of the closely guarded coffee bushes from Mocha, Yemen, in 1616. He took them back to Amsterdam and found a home for them in the Hortus Botanicus (botanical garden), where they began to thrive. This apparently minor event received little publicity but was to have a major impact on the history of coffee.

The beans that van der Broecke acquired from Mocha forty years earlier adjusted well to conditions in the greenhouses at the Amsterdam Hortus Botanicus and produced numerous healthy C. arabica bushes. In 1658 the Dutch first used them to begin coffee cultivation in Ceylon (now Sri Lanka) and later in southern India. They abandoned this cultivation to focus on their Javanese plantations in order to avoid lowering the price by oversupply.

Within a few years, the Dutch colonies of the Dutch East Indies (now Indonesia) in Asia and Dutch Guiana (now Suriname) in the Americas had become the main suppliers of coffee to Europe.

=== Poland ===
Coffee reached the Polish–Lithuanian Commonwealth in the 17th century, primarily through merchants trading with the neighbouring Ottoman Empire. The first coffee shops opened a century later. The intake of coffee has grown since the change of government in 1989, though consumption per capita is lower than in most European countries. During the Communist period, where there were shortages of everything, including coffee, Poles developed their own substitute to coffee, Inka, made from roasted cereal. Nowadays, Poland is experiencing an explosion of coffee consumption through rapid expansion of cafes, and new trends such as the specialty coffee.

== Americas ==
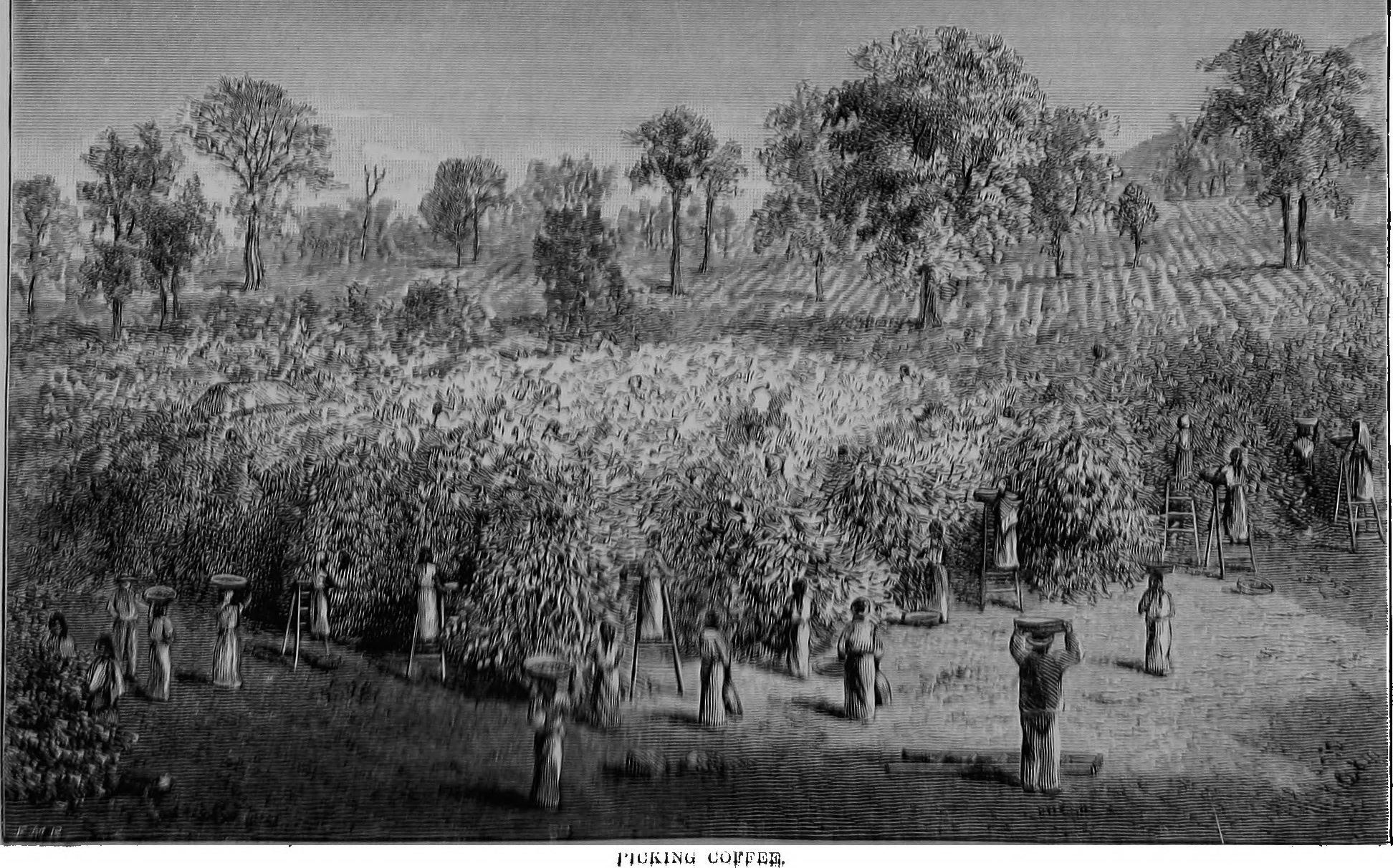
Coffee plantation

Gabriel de Clieu brought coffee seedlings to Martinique in the Caribbean in 1720. Those sprouts flourished and 50 years later there were 18,680 coffee trees in Martinique enabling the spread of coffee cultivation to Saint-Domingue (Haiti), Mexico and other islands of the Caribbean. The French territory of Saint-Domingue saw coffee cultivated starting in 1734, and by 1788 supplied half the world's coffee. Coffee had a major influence on the geography of Latin America. The French colonial plantations relied heavily on African slave laborers. However, the dreadful conditions that the slaves worked in on coffee plantations were a factor in the soon-to-follow Haitian Revolution. The coffee industry never fully recovered there.

Coffee also found its way to the Isle of Bourbon, now known as Réunion, in the Indian Ocean. The plant produced smaller beans and was deemed a different variety of arabica known as var. Bourbon. The Santos coffee of Brazil and the Oaxaca coffee of Mexico are the progeny of that Bourbon tree. Circa 1727, King John V of Portugal sent Francisco de Melo Palheta to French Guiana to obtain coffee seeds to become a part of the coffee market. Francisco initially had difficulty obtaining these seeds, but he captivated the French Governor's wife, and she sent him enough seeds and shoots to commence the coffee industry of Brazil. However, cultivation did not gather momentum until independence in 1822, leading to the clearing of massive tracts of the Atlantic Forest, first from the vicinity of Rio and later São Paulo for coffee plantations. In 1893, the coffee from Brazil was introduced into Kenya and Tanzania (Tanganyika), not far from its place of origin in Ethiopia, 600 years prior, ending its transcontinental journey.

After the Boston Tea Party of 1773, large numbers of the US switched to drinking coffee during the American Revolution because drinking tea had become unpatriotic.

Cultivation was taken up by many countries in the latter half of the 19th century, and in almost all of them it involved the large-scale displacement and exploitation of indigenous people. Harsh conditions led to many uprisings, coups and bloody suppressions of peasants. For example, Guatemala started producing coffee in the 1500s but lacked the manpower to harvest the coffee beans. As a result, the Guatemalan government forced indigenous people to work on the fields. This led to a strain in the indigenous and Guatemalan people's relationship that still exists today. A notable exception is Costa Rica where a lack of ready labor prevented the formation of large farms. Smaller farms and more egalitarian conditions ameliorated unrest over the 19th and 20th centuries.

In the 20th century, Latin American countries faced a possible economic collapse. Before World War II, Europe was consuming large amounts of coffee. Once the war started, Latin America lost 40% of its market and was on the verge of economic collapse. Coffee was and is a Latin American commodity. The United States saw this and talked with the Latin American countries and as a result the producers agreed on an equitable division of the US market. The U.S. government monitored this agreement. For the period that this plan was followed the value of coffee doubled, which greatly benefited coffee producers and the Latin American countries.

Brazil became the largest producer of coffee in the world by 1852 and it has held that status ever since. It dominated world production, exporting more coffee than the rest of the world combined, from 1850 to 1950. The period since 1950 saw the widening of the playing field due to the emergence of several other major producers, notably Colombia, Ivory Coast, Ethiopia, and, most recently, Vietnam, which overtook Colombia and became the second-largest producer in 1999 and reached 15% market share by 2011.

Recent additions to the coffee market are lattes, Frappuccinos and other sugary coffee drinks. This has caused coffee houses to be able to use cheaper coffee beans in their coffee.

== Asia ==
During the cultivation, brewed coffee was reserved exclusively for the priesthood and the medical profession; doctors would use the brew for patients experiencing a need for better digestion, and priests used it to stay alert during their long nights of studying for the church.

=== India ===
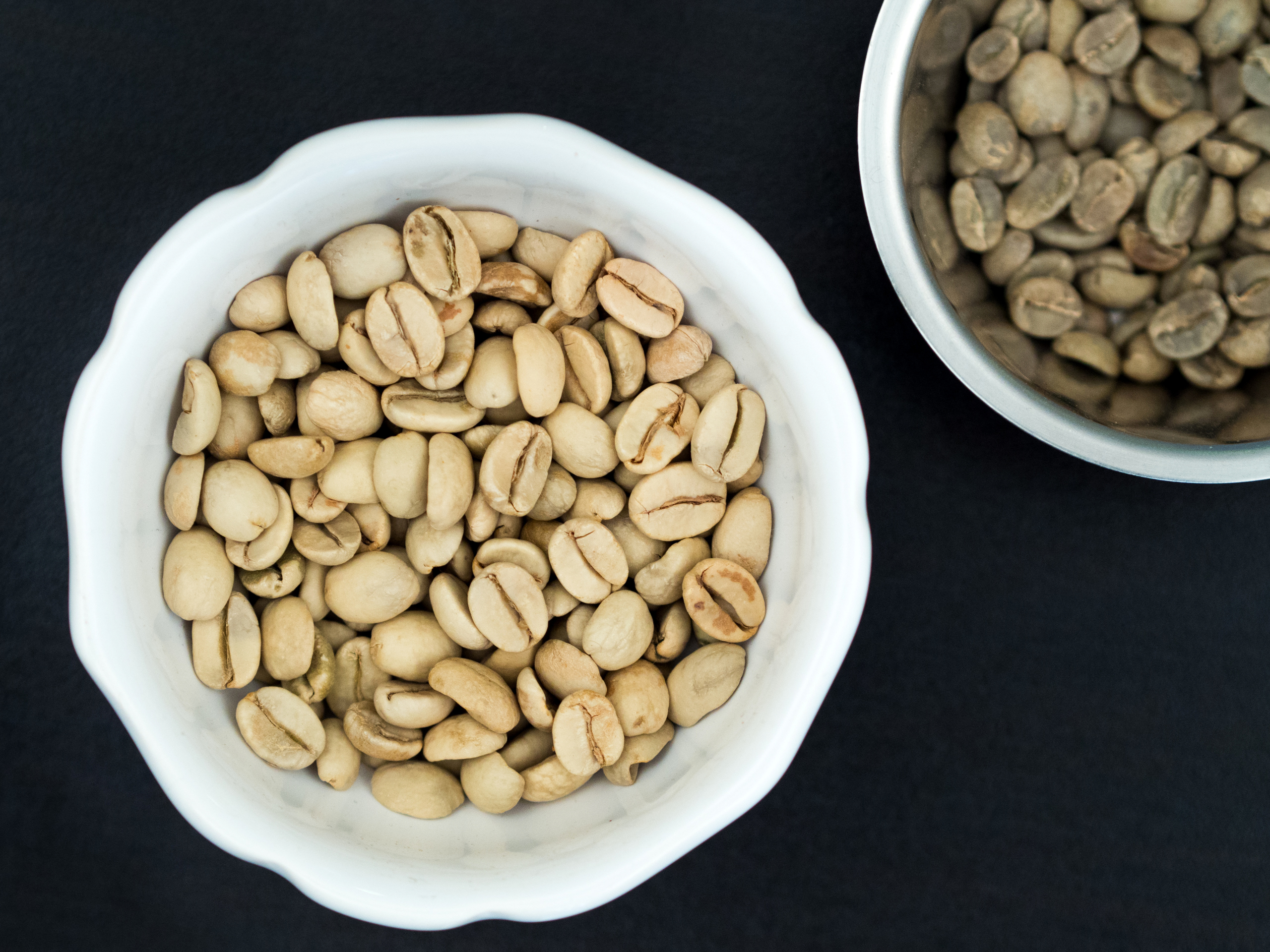
Monsooned Malabar arabica, compared with green Yirgachefe beans from Ethiopia

Coffee came to India well before the East India company

Coffee's introduction to India is credited to the "Mughal era", particularly through a Sufi saint named "Baba Budan".

In the 17th century, the first record of coffee growing in India is following the introduction of coffee beans from Yemen, during his pilgrimage to Mecca. He planted these beans in the Chandragiri hills of Karnataka, which are now named Baba Budangiri in his honour. This act marked the beginning of coffee cultivation in India, extending south to Kodagu.

In India, the word for coffee is "kaapi" in several South Indian languages, such as Tamil, Telugu,Malayalam and Kannada.

Coffee production in India is dominated in the hill tracts of South Indian states, with the state of Karnataka accounting for 53% of the country's coffee production, followed by Kerala (28%) and Tamil Nadu (11%). Indian coffee is said to be the finest coffee grown in the shade rather than direct sunlight anywhere in the world. There are approximately 250,000 coffee growers in India; 98% of them are small growers. As of 2009, the production of coffee in India was only 4.5% of the total production in the world. Almost 80% of the country's coffee production is exported. Of that which is exported, 70% is bound for Germany, Russian federation, Spain, Belgium, Slovenia, United States, Japan, Greece, Netherlands, and France, and Italy accounts for 29% of the exports. Most of the export is shipped through the Suez Canal.

Coffee is grown in three regions of India with Karnataka, Kerala and Tamil Nadu forming the traditional coffee growing region of South India, followed by the new areas developed in the non-traditional areas of Andhra Pradesh and Orissa in the eastern coast of the country and with a third region comprising the states of Assam, Manipur, Meghalaya, Mizoram, Tripura, Nagaland, and Arunachal Pradesh of Northeastern India, popularly known as "Seven Sister States of India".

Indian coffee, grown mostly in southern India under monsoon rainfall conditions, is also termed as "Indian monsooned coffee". Its flavour is defined as: "The best Indian coffee reaches the flavour characteristics of Pacific coffees, but at its worst it is simply bland and uninspiring". The two well-known species of coffee grown are the Arabica and Robusta. The first variety that was introduced in the Baba Budangiri hill ranges of Karnataka in the 17th century was marketed over the years under the brand names of Kent and S.795. Coffee is served in a distinctive drip-style "filter coffee" across Southern India.

==== Chikmagalur ====
Coffee is the cornerstone of Chikmagalur's economy. Chikmagalur is the birthplace of coffee in India, where the seed was first sown about 350 years ago. Coffee Board is the department located in Chikmagalur town that oversees the production and marketing of coffee cultivated in the district.

Coffee is cultivated in Chikmagalur district in an area of around 85,465 hectares with Arabica being the dominant variety grown in upper hills and Robusta being the major variety in the low-level hills. There are around 15,000 coffee growers in this district with 96% of them being small growers with holdings of less than or equal to 4 hectares. The average production is 55,000 MT: 35,000 MT of Arabica and 20,000 MT of Robusta.

The average productivity per hectare is 810 kg for Arabica and 1110 kg of Robusta, which are higher than the national average.

=== Japan ===
Coffee was introduced to Japan by the Dutch in the 17th century but remained a curiosity until the lifting of trade restrictions in 1858. The first European-style coffeehouse opened in Tokyo in 1888 and closed four years later. By the early 1930s there were over 30,000 coffeehouses across the country; availability in the wartime and immediate postwar period dropped to nearly zero, then rapidly increased as import barriers were removed. The introduction of freeze-dried instant coffee, canned coffee, and franchises such as Starbucks and Doutor Coffee in the late 20th century continued this trend, to the point that Japan is now one of the leading per capita coffee consumers in the world.

=== South Korea ===
Coffee's first notable Korean enthusiasts were 19th century emperors Sunjong and Gojong, who preferred to consume it after western-style banquets. After Korea's first coffee shop opened 1902, coffee was enjoyed by Korea's elites, who viewed coffee as a symbol of western culture and status. Coffee was later introduced to the general public in the 1950s by American soldiers stationed in Korea. The number of small, individually owned coffee shops, called dabang, increased rapidly; by the late 1950s, there were over 3,000 of them. In 1976, Korean beverage company Dongsuh Foods introduced the coffee mix, a mixture of instant coffee, creamer and sugar packaged in individual packets. This product contributed to the popularisation of instant coffee, and later became an office staple after the Asian financial crisis. By the 1980s instant coffee and canned coffee had become fairly popular, with a more minor tradition of independently owned coffeehouses in larger cities. Toward the end of the century the growth of franchises such as Caffe Bene and Starbucks brought about a greater demand for European-style coffee, and led to the decline of dabangs.

=== Indonesia ===
Coffee was first introduced to Indonesia by the Dutch during the colonisation of the Dutch East Indies in the late 17th century. After several years coffee was planted and many coffee specialities are from the archipelago. The English colloquial name for coffee, Java, comes from the time when most of the Western coffee was grown in Java. Today Indonesia is one of the largest coffee producers in the world, mainly for export. However, coffee is enjoyed in various ways around the archipelago, for example, the traditional "kopi tubruk".

=== Philippines ===
The Philippines is one of the few countries that produces the four varieties of commercially viable coffee: Arabica, Liberica (Barako), Excelsa, and Robusta. Although it is generally said that coffee was introduced to Lipa in 1740 by a Spanish Franciscan friar, there is actually little first-hand evidence to substantiate this. Regardless, by the early 19th century, coffee was being cultivated throughout the Philippines and subsequently exported to the Americas and Australia, followed by Europe with the opening of the Suez Canal. Lipa is commonly attributed as being the center of this cultivation, until roughly 1889, when its industry abruptly failed, likely due to pests, coffee rust (which the Philippines had managed to avoid for longer than the rest of the world), and political factors.

Following this destruction, the Philippines' place in the global coffee supply chain faltered, and would be slow to recover. Throughout the 20th century, various government initiatives were implemented to revive the industry, despite that the Philippines would gradually begin importing more instant coffee than it was exporting. Regardless, a coffee culture has been developing since the 1990s, following the Philippines joining the International Coffee Organization in 1980, and now many specialty coffee shops can be found around the country.

=== Vietnam ===
Vietnam is one of the world's main coffee exporters. Arabica is the first imported coffee variety to Vietnam since 1857. Initially being grown in the northern provinces, the cultivation of coffee spread until it reached the Central and Western Highlands, which now produce a majority of Vietnam's coffee. Most notably among these is the city of Buôn Ma Thuột, which is known as the "coffee capital of Vietnam".

Trung Nguyen Coffee was founded in 1996 by Dang Le Nguyen Vu, and is the premier coffee brand in Vietnam to this day.

== Production ==
The first step in Europeans' wresting the means of production was effected by Nicolaes Witsen, the enterprising burgomaster of Amsterdam and member of the governing board of the Dutch East India Company who urged Joan van Hoorn, the Dutch governor at Batavia that some coffee plants be obtained at the export port of Mocha in Yemen, the source of Europe's supply, and established in the Dutch East Indies; the project of raising many plants from the seeds of the first shipment met with such success that the Dutch East India Company was able to supply Europe's demand with "Java coffee" by 1719. Encouraged by their success, they soon had coffee plantations in Ceylon, Sumatra and other Sunda islands. Coffee trees were soon grown under glass at the Hortus Botanicus of Leiden, whence slips were generously extended to other botanical gardens. Dutch representatives at the negotiations that led to the Treaty of Utrecht presented their French counterparts with a coffee plant, grown on at the Jardin du Roi, predecessor of the Jardin des Plantes, in Paris.

The introduction of coffee to the Americas was effected by Captain Gabriel DeClieu, who obtained cuttings from the reluctant botanist Antoine de Jussieu, who was loath to disfigure the king's coffee tree. Clieux, when water rations dwindled during a difficult voyage, shared his portion with his precious plants and protected them from a Dutchman, perhaps an agent of the Provinces jealous of the Batavian trade. Clieux nurtured the plants on his arrival in the West Indies, and established them in Guadeloupe and Saint-Domingue in addition to Martinique, where a blight had struck the cacao plantations, which were replaced by coffee plantations in a space of three years, is attributed to France through its colonization of many parts of the continent starting with the Martinique and the colonies of the West Indies where the first French coffee plantations were founded.

The first coffee plantation in Brazil occurred in 1727 when Lt. Col. Francisco de Melo Palheta smuggled seeds, still essentially from the germ plasm originally taken from Yemen to Batavia, from French Guiana. By the 1800s, Brazil's harvests would turn coffee from an elite indulgence to a drink for the masses. Brazil, which like most other countries cultivates coffee as a commercial commodity, relied heavily on slave labour from Africa for the viability of the plantations until the abolition of slavery in 1888. The success of coffee in 17th-century Europe was paralleled with the spread of the habit of tobacco smoking all over the continent during the course of the Thirty Years' War (1618–1648).

For many decades in the 19th and early 20th centuries, Brazil was the biggest producer of coffee and a virtual monopolist in the trade. However, a policy of maintaining high prices soon opened opportunities to other nations, such as Venezuela, Colombia, Guatemala, Nicaragua, Indonesia, and Vietnam, now second only to Brazil as the major coffee producer in the world. Large-scale production in Vietnam began following normalization of trade relations with the US in 1995. Nearly all of the coffee grown there is Robusta.

Despite the origins of coffee cultivation in Ethiopia, that country produced only a small amount for export until the twentieth century, and much of that not from the south of the country but from the environs of Harar in the northeast. The Kingdom of Kaffa, home of the plant, was estimated to produce between 50,000 and 60,000 kilograms of coffee beans in the 1880s. Commercial production effectively began in 1907 with the founding of the inland port of Gambela. 100,000 kilograms of coffee was exported from Gambela in 1908, while in 1927–1928 over 4 million kilograms passed through that port. Coffee plantations were also developed in Arsi Province at the same time and were eventually exported by means of the Addis Ababa – Djibouti Railway. While only 245,000 kilograms were freighted by the Railway, this amount jumped to 2,240,000 kilograms by 1922, surpassed exports of "Harari" coffee by 1925, and reached 9,260,000 kilograms in 1936.

Australia is a minor coffee producer, with little product for export, but its coffee history goes back to 1880 when the first of 2.0 km^{2} (500 acres) began to be developed in an area between northern New South Wales and Cooktown. Today there are several producers of Arabica coffee in Australia that use a mechanical harvesting system invented in 1981.

== See also ==
- Anacafé
- Economics of coffee
- Federación Nacional de Cafeteros de Colombia
- International Coffee Agreement
- National Coffee Association
- Specialty Coffee Association of America
