= Yaana (film) =

2019 Indian Kannada-language film

Yaanaa
- Theatrical release poster
- Directed by: Vijayalakshmi Singh
- Written by: Vijayalakshmi Singh
- Produced by: Harish Sherigar; Sharmila Sherigar
- Starring: Vaibhavi; Vainidhi; Vaisiri; Sumukha; Chakravarthy; Abhishek
- Cinematography: Karm Chawla
- Edited by: B. S. Kemparaju
- Music by: Songs: Joshua Sridhar; Score: J. Anoop Seelin
- Production companies: i Entertainment; ACME Movies International Production
- Distributed by: KRG Studios
- Release date: 12 July 2019
- Running time: 135 minutes
- Country: India
- Language: Kannada

Yaanaa is a 2019 Kannada language road trip film written and directed by Vijayalakshmi Singh and produced by Harish Sherigar and Sharmila Sherigar under banners of i Entertainment and ACME Movies International Production. The music of film is scored by Joshua Sridhar and Anoop Seelin. The film introduces Vaibhavi, Vainidhi, Vaisiri, Sumukha, Chakravarthy and Abhishek. The other cast includes Suhasini, Sadhu Kokila, Chikanna, Rangayana Raghu and Ananth Nag. The film was theatrically released on 12 July 2019.

== Plot ==
The film follows three collegiates, Maya (Vaibhavi), Anjali (Vaisiri), and Nandini (Vainidhi), who take a road trip to Goa to de-stress.

== Cast ==
- Vainidhi Jagdish as Nandini
- Vaibhavi Jagdish as Maya
- Vaisiri Jagdish as Anjali
- Sumukha as Varun
- Chakravarthy
- Abhishek
- Shivraj K R Pate
- Apoorva Gururaja as Apoorva
- Ananth Nag
- Suhasini Maniratnam
- Sadhu Kokila
- Rangayana Raghu
- Chikkanna
- Prakash Thuminad as Driver
- Hampa Angadi

== Production ==
Vaibhavi (Maya), Vaisiri (Anjali) and Vainidhi (Nandini) are siblings in real life and the daughters of Jai Jagadish and Vijayalakshmi Singh. The shoot took place in Bengaluru, Goa and Belagavi.

== Soundtrack ==
Yaanaa

Soundtrack album by Joshua Sridhar, Anoop Seelin
- Released: 25 July 2019
- Recorded: 2018–2019
- Genre: Soundtrack
- Length: 27:58
- Label: Lahari Music
External audio
- Audio Jukebox on YouTube

Singles from Yaanaa
- 1. "Beelale Naa Beelale" Released: Jun 24, 2019; 2. "Awasara" Released: Jun 24, 2019; 3. "Gari Bichchi Mari Hakki" Released: Jun 24, 2019; 4. "Teerada Mounava" Released: Jun 23, 2019; 5. "Mirchi Song" Released: Jul 5, 2019

The songs and score were composed by Joshua Sridhar and J. Anoop Seelin, respectively.

Track list
| No. | Title | Lyrics | Singer(s) | Length |
|---|---|---|---|---|
| 1. | "Beelale Naa Beelale" | Shashank | Prakriti Kakar | 3:42 |
| 2. | "Awasara" | Hrudaya Shiva | Shashaa Tirupati | 3:42 |
| 3. | "Gari Bichchi Mari Hakki" | Kaviraj | Raghu Dixit | 4:57 |
| 4. | "Teerada Mounava" | Jayant Kaikini | Vijay Prakash | 4:40 |
| 5. | "Mirchi Song" | Yograj Bhatt | Supriya Lohith, Indu Nagaraj, Santhosh Venky | 4:40 |
| 6. | "Beauty Queen" | Chetan Kumar | Chandan Shetty, Shashank Sheshagiri, Apoorva Shreedhar, Rapper Siri Narayan | 3:38 |
| 7. | "Bhoomi Myage" | Chetan Kumar | Siddarth Suresh | 2:39 |
| Total length: | | | | 27:58 |

== Release ==
The official trailer of the film was launched by Lahari Music on 27 June 2019.

=== Home media ===
The movie rights was sold to Amazon Prime Video.

== Reception ==
Sunayana Suresh of The Times of India rated the film three out of five stars and wrote, "If you love college capers with a dose of emotional drama, this is just what you should watch this weekend." Shyam Prasad S. of Bangalore Mirror gave the film three out of five stars and wrote, "Yaanaa is unusual for a Kannada film. It is a welcome change for audience subject to routine commercial torture. Along with soothing songs, visual-treat locales and an easy flow, it is a trip you will not regret."

A Sharadhaa of The New Indian Express gave it three out of five stars and wrote, "A film that mirrors today’s cosmopolitan lifestyle of young girls and boys, Yaanaa is indeed enduring, giving a tip to all those battling heart breaks and depression, helping them live a renewed life." Aravind Shwetha of The News Minute opined that "The film is youth-centric and shows the issues faced by the millennial generation in an appealing way. Their inability to distinguish between black and white, and the greys in between, forms the crux of the film. Though Yaanaa is not free from flaws, this generation actually gets a movie after Moggina Manasu that they can all relate to and rave about."
