= Namma Oorina Rasikaru =

2021 Indian Kannada-language web series

- Genre: Drama
- Based on: Namma Oorina Rasikaru by Gorur Ramaswamy Iyengar
- Directed by: Nandita Yadav
- Starring: Rajesh Nataranga; Lakshmi Gopalaswamy; P. Sheshadri; Sumukha; Mandya Ramesh; B. Suresh
- Country of origin: India
- Original language: Kannada

Original release
- Release: 23 December 2021

Namma Oorina Rasikaru is a 2021 Indian Kannada-language drama web series directed by Nandita Yadav. The series is based on the literary work of Gorur Ramaswamy Iyengar and stars Rajesh Nataranga, Lakshmi Gopalaswamy, P. Sheshadri, Sumukha, Mandya Ramesh and B. Suresh.

== Plot ==
The series is set in the village of Gorur during the pre-Independence period and follows the daily lives of its residents. It presents a series of episodic narratives depicting social customs, relationships and community life, often drawing on humour and satire.

The stories are adapted from the works of Gorur Ramaswamy Iyengar and address themes such as caste, social practices and reform.

== Cast ==
- Rajesh Nataranga
- Lakshmi Gopalaswamy
- P. Sheshadri
- Sumukha
- Mandya Ramesh
- B. Suresh

== Production ==
The series is an adaptation of the writings of Gorur Ramaswamy Iyengar. It was directed by Nandita Yadav and produced for the Kannada OTT platform Katte.

== Release ==
The series was released on the OTT platform Katte in 2021.

== Reception ==
Namma Oorina Rasikaru received generally positive reviews from critics.

Sunayana Suresh from The Times of India rated the series 3.5 out of 5 stars, describing it as "a simple, quirky and entertaining tale" and noting that it brings to life the world of Gorur Ramaswamy Iyengar’s stories through its characters and setting.

The review also highlighted the series' focus on everyday village life and its episodic storytelling format.

Writing for OTTplay, Prathiba Joy praised the ensemble cast and described the series as offering a "fun take on social injustice, casteism and more".
