= Sumukha =

Indian actor

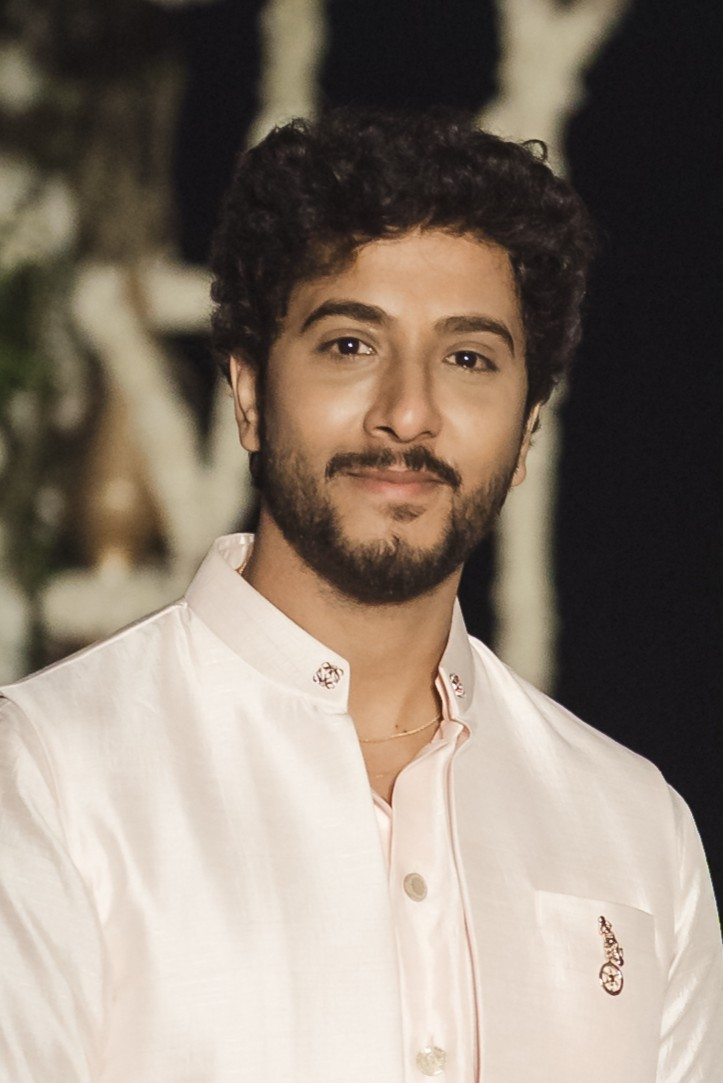
- Sumukha in 2026
- Born: 9 September; Bengaluru, Karnataka, India
- Education: The Valley School
- Occupations: Actor; Writer; Director
- Years active: 2017–present
- Spouse: Maitri Uka (m. 2026)
- Parent(s): Shashi Kumar (father); Nanditha Yadav (mother)

Sumukha (born 9 September) is an Indian actor, writer and director working primarily in Kannada cinema. He is known for his roles in the films Yaanaa (2019), Physics Teacher (2022), and Manada Kadalu (2025).

== Early life and background ==
Sumukha was born in Bengaluru, Karnataka to actor Shashi Kumar and filmmaker Nanditha Yadav. He began his acting journey at the age of 6, appearing as a child actor in films, television, and theatre productions. Growing up in a family rooted in the performing arts, he developed a strong foundation in acting and storytelling from an early age. After completing his schooling at The Valley School in Bengaluru, he relocated to Mumbai, Maharashtra to further develop his acting skills and pursue professional opportunities in theatre and film.

== Theatre career ==
Sumukha began performing in theatre in Bengaluru, Karnataka, continuing until Grade 12. He later moved to Mumbai, Maharashtra, where he spent nearly eight years performing live theatre, primarily in Hindi, to prepare for a career in films. Sumukha has performed in theatre productions at venues including Prithvi Theatre and National Centre for the Performing Arts (NCPA) in Mumbai, as well as Ranga Shankara and Ravindra Kalakshetra in Bengaluru, contributing to his early development as an actor.

== Film career ==
Sumukha made his acting debut with the Kannada coming-of-age drama Yaanaa (2019), in which he played a central role. A review by Bangalore Mirror noted that he "impresses the most" among the cast. In 2022, Sumukha appeared in Physics Teacher, a philosophical drama that he also wrote and directed. The film was selected for the Bengaluru International Film Festival. Among his other early projects was Rajasthan Diaries, directed by Nanditha Yadav and filmed in 2019. The film remained unreleased as of 2024.

Sumukha subsequently appeared in Manada Kadalu directed by Yogaraj Bhat, which marked his move into mainstream commercial cinema. The film was described as a significant milestone in his career by critics, earning him recognition as a leading actor in Kannada cinema. In an interview, he shared that the project enabled him to embrace a broader audience while continuing to uphold his artistic sensibilities.

In 2026, Sumukha was announced as the lead in My Baby, directed by Preetham Gubbi. His other announced projects include Ganapati Bappa Morya, a political thriller directed by Sanjay KK. and an untitled comedy directed by Pannaga Bharana.

== Television ==
Sumukha has appeared in Hindi-language teleplays presented by Zee Theatre, including Agnipankh, Shobha Yatra, Vaastav and Shadyantra.

== Personal life ==
In February 2026, Sumukha married Maitri Uka, an architect from Mumbai, in a private ceremony in Rishikesh.

== Filmography ==
Key
†	Denotes films that have not yet been released

=== Film ===
Year	Title	Role(s)	Language	Notes	Ref.
2000	Munnudi	Young Unnisa	Kannada		
2017	Raju		Kannada	Karnataka State Film Award for Best Story	
2019	Yaanaa	Varun	Kannada		
2022	Physics Teacher	Badri	Kannada	Also writer and director Official BIFFES selection	
2025	Manada Kadalu	Sumukha	Kannada		
TBA	Rajasthan Diaries †	Ved	Kannada, Marathi	Filmed in 2019; unreleased	
2026	My Baby †	Preetham	Kannada	Filming	
2027	Ganapati Bappa Morya †	Maya	Kannada, Malayalam	Filming	
TBA	Untitled †		Kannada	Pannaga Bharana film in Production	

=== Television ===
Year	Title	Role(s)	Language	Notes	Ref.
2017	Agnipankh	Yashwant	Hindi	Teleplay on Zee Theatre	
2018	Shobha Yatra	Babu Genu	Hindi	Teleplay on Zee Theatre	
2018	Vaastav		Hindi	Teleplay on Zee Theatre	
2022	Shadyantra	Shashank	Hindi	Teleplay on Zee Theatre	

=== Theatre ===
Year	Title	Role(s)	Language	Notes	Ref.
2018	Janpath Kiss		Hindi	Assistant director	
2019	Hamidabai Ki Kothi		Hindi	Assistant director	

=== Web Series ===
Year	Title	Role(s)	Language	Notes	Ref.
2021	Namma Oorina Rasikaru		Kannada		

== Awards and nominations ==
Award	Year	Category	Work	Result	Ref.
Chittara Star Awards	2026	Promising Star Male	Manada Kadalu	Won	
Chittara Star Awards	2026	Best Lead Pair Of The Year	Manada Kadalu	Nominated	
South Indian International Movie Awards	2026	SIIMA Award for Best Male Debut – Kannada	Manada Kadalu	Nominated	
