= Yazdi cake =

Pastry of Yazd, Iran

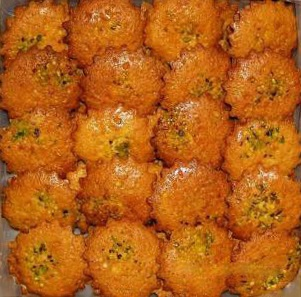
Yazdi cake

Yazdi cake is a cake native to Yazd in central Iran and is mostly used in Yazd Province itself for different ceremonies.

Its main ingredients are egg, sugar, solid oil or butter, white flour, sodium citrate, sodium bicarbonate, baking powder, yogurt, milk, cardamom and if needed raisins and sliced pistachio.

In Iran, Yazdi cake is especially used during social visits and daily tea rituals: it is commonly served alongside hot Persian tea (chai) when guests drop by, embodying the tradition of Iranian hospitality.
