= Zee Theatre =

Indian general entertainment online channel

- Logo used since 2025
- Country: India
- Network: Zee Entertainment Enterprises
- Headquarters: Mumbai, India

Programming
- Languages: Hindi, Urdu, English, Marathi, Gujarati
- Picture format: 1080p HDTV

Ownership
- Owner: Zee Entertainment Enterprises

History
- Launched: 21 September 2018; 8 years ago

Links
- Website: zeetheatre.com

Zee Theatre also known as Z Theater is a platform service by Zee Entertainment Enterprises. It offers a collection of recorded theatre plays, also called teleplays, produced in India and abroad. Zee Theatre is developed by Zee Special Projects.

== History ==
Zee Theatre was officially launched on 21 September 2018 on Tata Sky (now Tata Play). Shailja Kejriwal was appointed as a Chief Creative, Special Projects at ZEEL

In May 2022, Zee Theatre broadcast international plays including The Sound of Music Live!, Hairspray Live, Peter Pan Live! and Billy Elliot: The Musical.

In Nov and Dec. 2022, Zee Theatre launched two new teleplays Shadyantra and Koi Baat Chale with some of the best actors like Gopal Datt, Vineet Kumar, Manoj Pahwa, Hina Khan, Kunaal Roy Kapur, Chandan Roy Sanyal & Sumukha.

== Plays of Zee Theatre ==
Year	Play	Genre	Starcast	Notes
2017	Agnipankh	Political Power Drama	Gulki Joshi, Mita Vashisth, Satyajeet Dubey, Satyajit Sharma, Sumukha	
2018	Jana tha Roshanpura	Drama	Virendra Saxena, Ravi Mahashabde, Samta Sagar	
2018	Vaastav	Thriller	Puru Chibber, Mitalee Jagtap, Padmanabh Bind, Ajay Chourey, Sumukha, Satish Rajwade	
2019	Shireen Shah	Thriller	Joy Sengupta, Dilnaz Irani and Harsh Khurana	
2019	Gudiya ki Shaadi	Drama, Comedy	Shweta Basu Prasad, Virendra Saxena, Samta Sagar, Ishtiyaq Khan, Saroj Sharma, Neha Saraf, Vikram Kochhar, Anveshi Jain	
2020	Ladies Sangeet	Musical	Joy Sengupta, Nidhi Singh, Siddhant Karnick, Loveleen Mishra, Harsh Khurana, Sarika Singh, Monica Gupta, Niranjan Iyengar, Mallika Singh, Nivedita Bhargava	
2022	Gunehgaar	Thriller	Shweta Basu Prasad, Sumeet Vyas, Gajraj Rao	
2022	Shadyantra	Thriller	Kunaal Roy Kapur, Hina Khan, Chandan Roy Sanyal, Sumukha, Anang Desai	
2023	Yeh Shaadi Nahi Ho Sakti	Comedy	Gopal Datt, Lisha Bajaj, Prajakta Koli, Shikha Talsania	
