= Tungabhadra River =

River in southern India

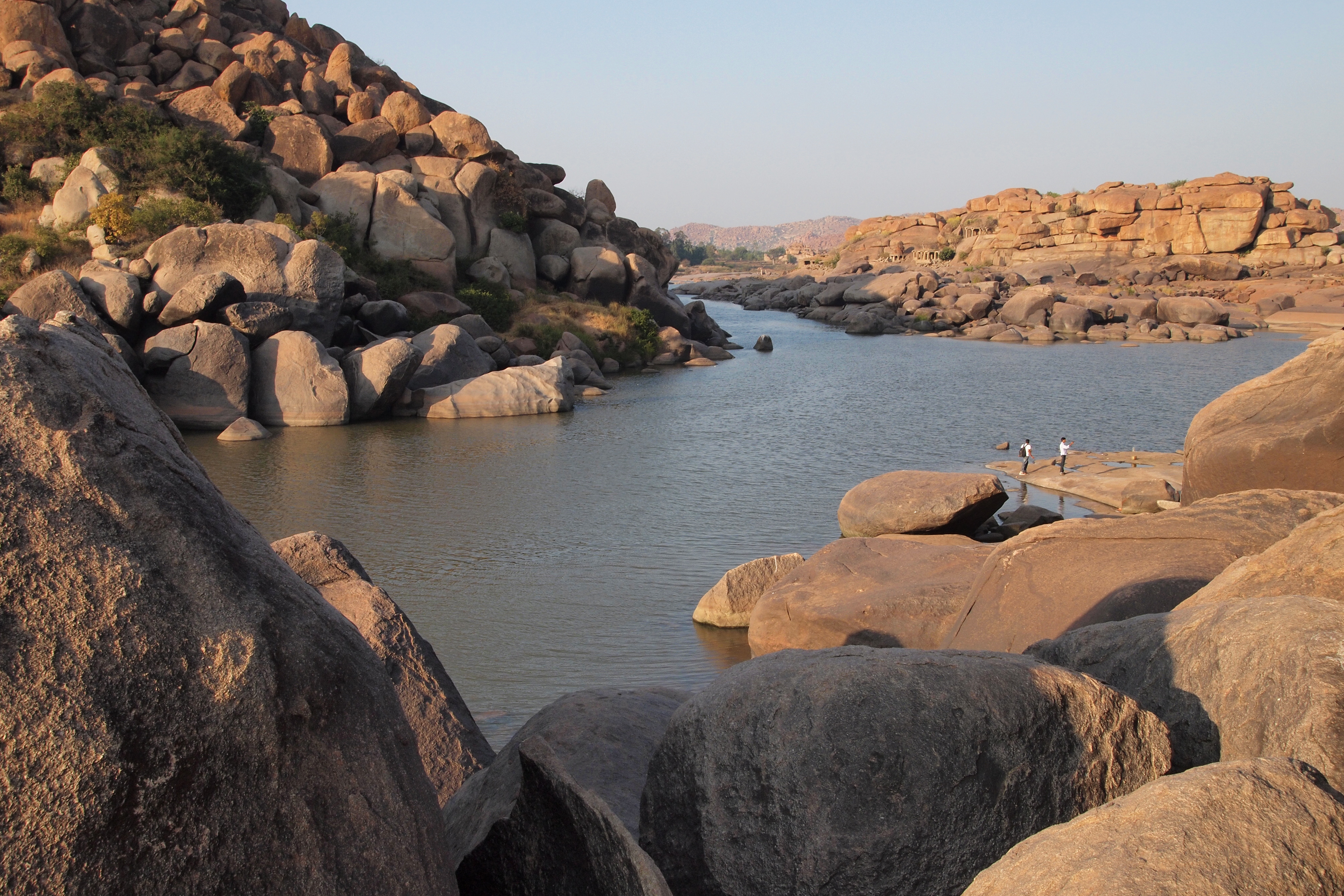
- Tungabhadra River at Hampi

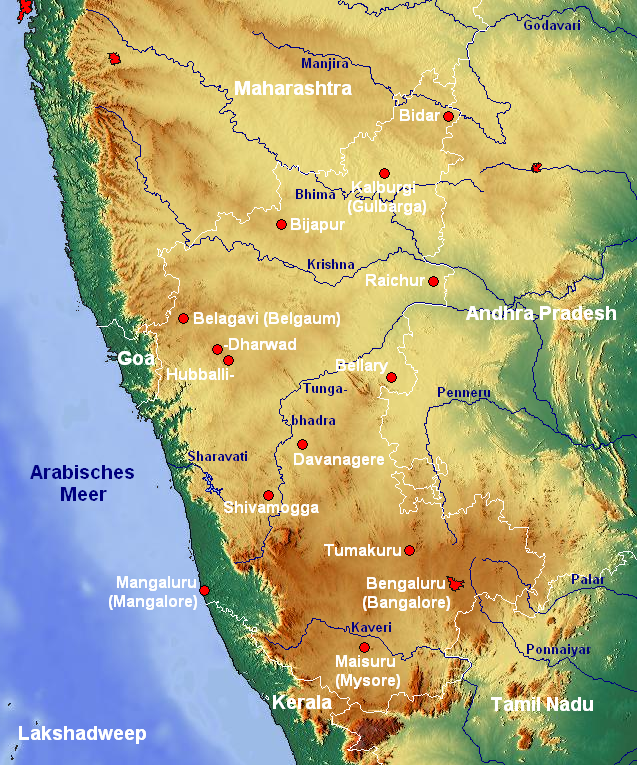
- Tungabhadra River

Location
- Country: India
- State: Karnataka, Andhra Pradesh, Telangana
- Cities: Harihara, Hospet, Hampi, Kampli, Mantralayam, Kurnool

Physical characteristics
- Source: Koodli (The place where the Thunga and Bhadra rivers meet)
  - location: Koodli, Bhadravathi, Karnataka, India
  - coordinates: 14°0′30″N 75°40′27″E
  - elevation: 560 m (1,840 ft)
- Mouth: Krishna River
  - location: Gudimalla, Jogulamba Gadwal District, Telangana, and Murvakonda, Andhra Pradesh, India
  - coordinates: 15°53′19″N 78°09′51″E
  - elevation: 264 m (866 ft)
- Length: 531 km (330 mi)
- Basin size: 71,417 km^{2} (27,574 sq mi)
- Discharge
  - location: Krishna River
  - maximum: Tunga and Bhadra are born in Gangamoola Varaha Parvata in the Chikmagalur district which comes in the Western ghat region of Karnataka. Both rivers meet at a place called Koodali in the Shivamogga district.

Basin features
- Tributaries
  - left: Tunga River, Kumudvati River, Varada River
  - right: Bhadra River, Vedavathi River,

The Tungabhadra River (Kannada: [t̪uŋɡɐbʱɐd̪rɐ]) starts and flows through the Karnataka, India, for most of its course, then through the borders of Telangana and Andhra Pradesh where it ultimately joins the Krishna River near Gudimalla and Murvakonda villages.

The Tungabhadra derives its name from two streams, the Tunga, about 147 km (91 mi) long, and the Bhadra, about 178 km (111 mi) long, which rise in the Western Ghats. The river after the confluence of the two streams in Koodali near Shimoga runs for about 531 km (330 mi) till it joins the river Krishna at Sangamaleshwaram in Andhra Pradesh. It runs for 382 km (237 mi) in Karnataka, forms the boundary between Karnataka and Telangana for 58 km (36 mi) and further runs for the next 91 km (57 mi) in Andhra Pradesh. The total catchment area of the river is 69,552 km^{2} (26,854 sq mi) up to its confluence with the Krishna and it is 28,177 km^{2} (10,879 sq mi) up to Tungabhadra Dam. It is influenced chiefly by the South-West monsoon. It is a perennial river, but the summer flows dwindle to as low as 2.83 to 1.42 cumec (100 to 50 cusec).

== Etymology ==
A compound of its two main tributaries from the Sanskrit words tunga "high" and bhadra "auspicious".

== Course ==
The Tungabhadra River is formed by the confluence of the Tunga River and the Bhadra River at Koodli, which flow down the eastern slope of the Western Ghats in the Karnataka. The two rivers originate in Kalasa Taluk of Chikmagalur district of Karnataka along with the Netravati River (a west-flowing river, joining the Arabian Sea near Mangaluru). The Tunga and the Bhadra rise at Gangamoola, in Varaha Parvatha in the Western Ghats, at an elevation of 1,458 metres (near Samse Village).

After emerging from the same source, the Bhadra River flows through Kudremukha mountain region, Tarikere Taluk and the industrial city of Bhadravathi, while the Tunga River flows through Sringeri, Thirthahalli and Shimoga Taluks. More than 100 tributaries, streams, creeks, rivulets and the like contribute to the two rivers. The journey of the Tunga and the Bhadra is 147 and 171 km (91 and 106 mi) respectively, till they join at Koodli. Hence from there, the composite name Tungabhadra was given. From there, the Tungabhadra meanders through the plains for a distance of 531 km (330 mi). After confluence, the Tungabhadra River flows through Honnāli and Harihara taluks of Davanagere district. Then it flows through Harapanahalli, Hoovina Hadagali, Hagaribommanahalli, Hospet and Siruguppa Taluks of Ballari district. In Siruguppa Taluk of Ballari district, it receives its tributary Vedavathi River. The river forms a natural boundary between Ballari district and Raichur districts along its course. After entering Andhra Pradesh, it flows through Mantralayam and then through Kurnool. It receives its tributary Handri-Neeva River near Kurnool. Then it joins the Krishna River near Gundimalla Village of Jogulamba Gadwal district of Telangana. The Varada flowing through Shimoga, Uttara Kannada and Haveri districts and Vedavathi River in Chikmagalur, Chitradurga and Ballari district in Karnataka and the Handrail in Kurnool district of Andhra Pradesh are the main tributaries of the Tungabhadra. Many rivulets and streams join these tributaries. There is a popular saying in Kannada "Tunga Paana, Ganga Snana", which means "Drink Tunga River water, which is tasty & sweet, and bath in Ganga River, which is holy".

An important feature of the river banks is the flood protection walls all along the rivers, constructed by Krishnadevaraya between 1525 and 1527 AD. They are found wherever there is a possibility of land erosion during the floods. It starts at Sringeri and ends at Kurnool, just few kilometres from its mouth. They are stone constructions and still intact. Very large boulders of 3' x 4' x 5' are also used in its construction.

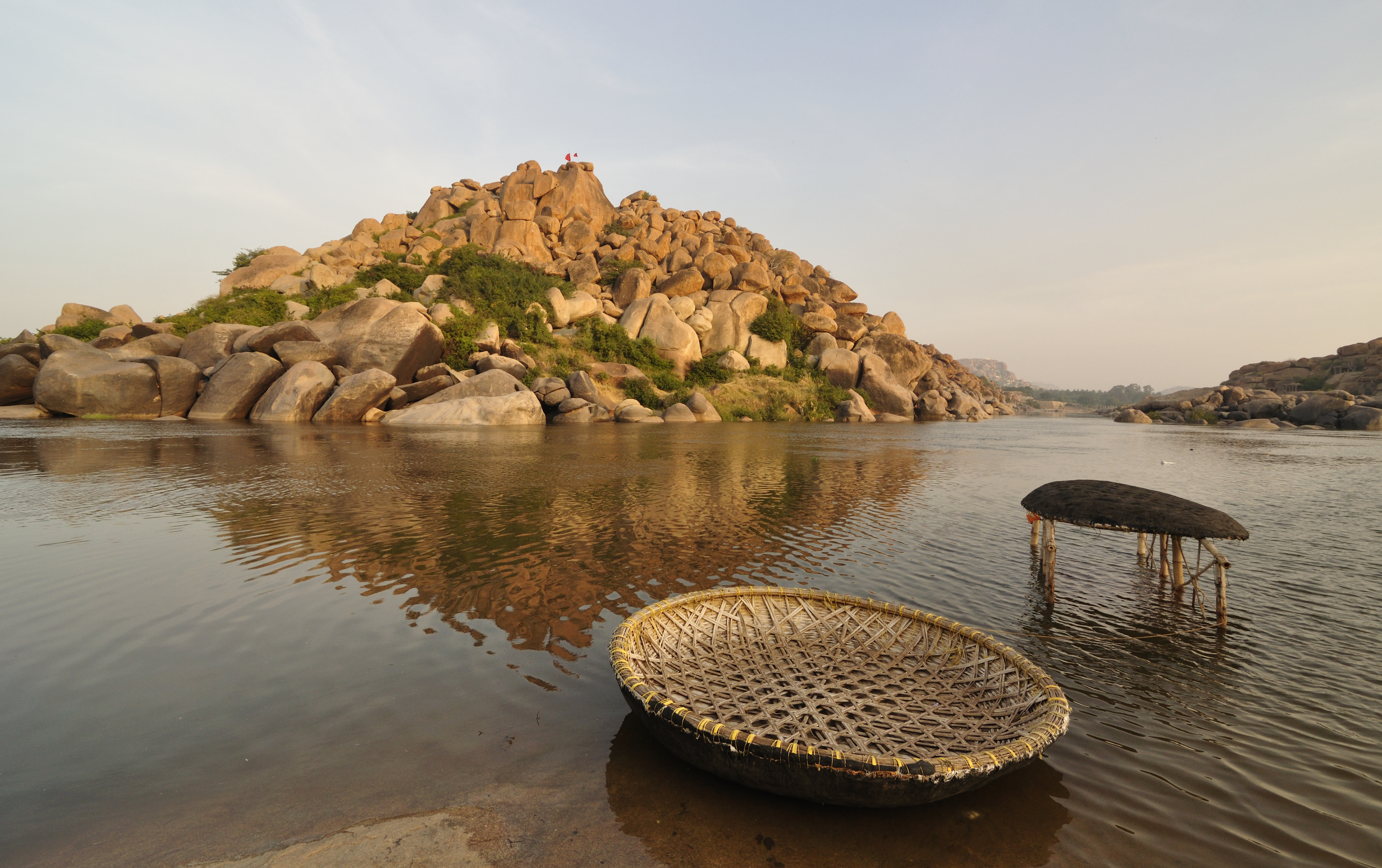
Two coracles in the river

Piles of granite in varying shades of grey, ochre and pink dominate the landscape. The river has cut through weaker rocky substrata of the Hampi landscape and created a narrow gorge where granite hills confine the river in a deep ravine.

In this setting the ruins of Vijayanagara and Hampi, the seat of power of the Vijayanagara Empire, overlook this holy river, creating a mythological landscape merging sacred traditions about a multitude of significant divinities.

The granite outcrops slowly disappear as the river flows south and the land opens into a long, broad plain ending at the rising slopes of the Sandur hills, rich in iron and manganese, beyond which is Hospet. The Tungabhadra Dam was constructed at Hospet in the middle of the 20th century to harness the river water, aiding the growth of agriculture and industry in the region.

The Tungabhadra River then flows east, joining the Krishna in Andhra Pradesh and Telangana border. From here the Krishna River continues east to empty into the Bay of Bengal. The wedge of land between the Tungabhadra and the Krishna is known as the Raichur Doab.

== Cultural significance ==
According to a Hindu mythological legend, after killing the demon Hiranyaksha, Varaha (the third incarnation of Vishnu) felt very tired. He took rest on the region now known as Varaha Parvatha. When he sat on that peak, sweat began flowing from his scalp. The sweat which flowed from the left side of his scalp became the Tunga River, and the sweat which flowed from his right side became Bhadra River.

The confluence of Tungabhadra and Krishna River is a holy pilgrimage site - The Sangameswaram Temple. The Jogulamba Temple (dedicated to Devi) is present near Alampur village. The Sangameswaram Temple (Dedicated to Shiva) is present in Kurnool district, Andhra Pradesh.

There are many holy places all along the rivers, primarily the temples of Saiva cult on the banks of the Bhadra and all the cults on the banks of the Tunga. Sringeri Sharada Peetham established by the Adi Shankara is the most famous one on the left bank of the Tunga, about 50 km (31 mi) downstream of its origin. The earlier Shringeri Sharada Peetham established by Adi Shankara is at Koodli, the place of confluence of Tunga and Bhadra rivers. Hampi one of the important heritage locations being listed by UNESCO is on the banks of the Tunga Bhadra River. Nava Brindavana, an island where the final resting location of nine holy Madhva saints is in the midst of the Tunga Bhadra River. One can view the Tunga Bhadra River from famous Yantrodharaka Hanuman Temple, Hampi. Virupaksha Temple, Hampi is also on the banks of the Tunga Bhadra River. The resting spot of Vasudendra Teertha is also on the banks of Tungabhadra River at Kenchanagudda, Siruguppa. Manthralayam Raghavendra Math in Kurnool district and Alampur District, Jogulamba is the presiding deity at this holy place of Alampur- known as Dakshina Kashi, are the other important pilgrimage centres. There is a cluster of Nava Brahma temples constructed by the early Chalukya dynasty.

== Recent dams ==
A dam was constructed about 15 kilometres (9.3 mi) upstream from Shimoga at Gajanur across the River Tunga. Another dam was constructed at Lakkavalli about 15 kilometres (9.3 mi) upstream of Bhadravati across the River Bhadra. They are multipurpose dams (multipurpose dams help in generation of electricity, irrigation of land, prevention and control of floods, etc.) and irrigate lands in Shimoga, Chikmagalur, Davanagere and Haveri.

Tungabhadra Dam (TB Dam), also considered a multipurpose dam, is across the river Tungabhadra. The dam is near the town of Hospet in Karnataka. Its storage capacity is 135 Tmcft. Owing to siltation, the capacity has come down by about 30 tmcft. If there are seasonal and late rains, an estimated 235 tmcft is released. It is filled when water is let into the canals during the rainy season. The main architect of the dam was Malur Srinivasa Thirumale Iyengar, an engineer from Chennai. A general-purpose hall was named after him. It has become a picnic or tourist spot over the years. TB Dam is near the heritage site Hampi. One of the major problems and concerns associated with TB Dam is that it has been undergoing a lot of siltation. Because of silt deposition in the dam, the storage capacity of the dam is coming down. Another major problem associated with TB Dam is increased pollution, resulting in decreasing fish population. This is seriously affecting fishermen, who are solely dependent on the river for their livelihood.

The Sunkesula Barrage near Kurnool city, a long barrage dam, was constructed across the Tungabhadra River around 1860 by the British engineer, hailed as Bhagiratha for Rayalaseema, Arthur Cotton. Originally, it was intended to be used for navigation during the British Raj. The barrage was reconstructed by Kotla Vijayabhaskara Reddy as Tungabhadra Barrage, to provide irrigation for Cuddapah district. As road and rail transportation increased, it is now supplying water for Kurnool and Cuddapah districts, through the K. C. Canal. It impounds about 1.5 billion cuft of water and irrigates about 300,000 acres (1,200 km^{2}) amount of land in Kurnool and Kadapa districts.

== Problems ==
Industrial pollution has damaged the Tungabhadra River. Industry and mining on its banks in the Chikmagalur, Shimoga, Davanagere, Haveri, Vijayanagara, Ballari, Koppal and Raichur district of Karnataka and in the Kurnool district of Andhra Pradesh generate enormous amounts of effluents. Nearly 30 million liters of effluents are released into the Tunga from Shimoga each year." This is the contribution of just one city which, unlike Bhadravathi and Hospet, cannot boast of being an industrial city. As a result of the effluents, Tungabhadra is one of the most polluted rivers in the country.

Downriver from the industries, the water has turned dark brown and has a pungent odor. Tungabhadra River's pollution has affected 1 million people in the sub-basin as most villages use the river water for drinking, bathing, irrigating crops, fishing and livestock water, previously obtained through an ancient tank system. The livelihood of village fishermen has been harmed by regular fish kills that have exhausted Tungabhadra's fisheries.

== Gallery ==
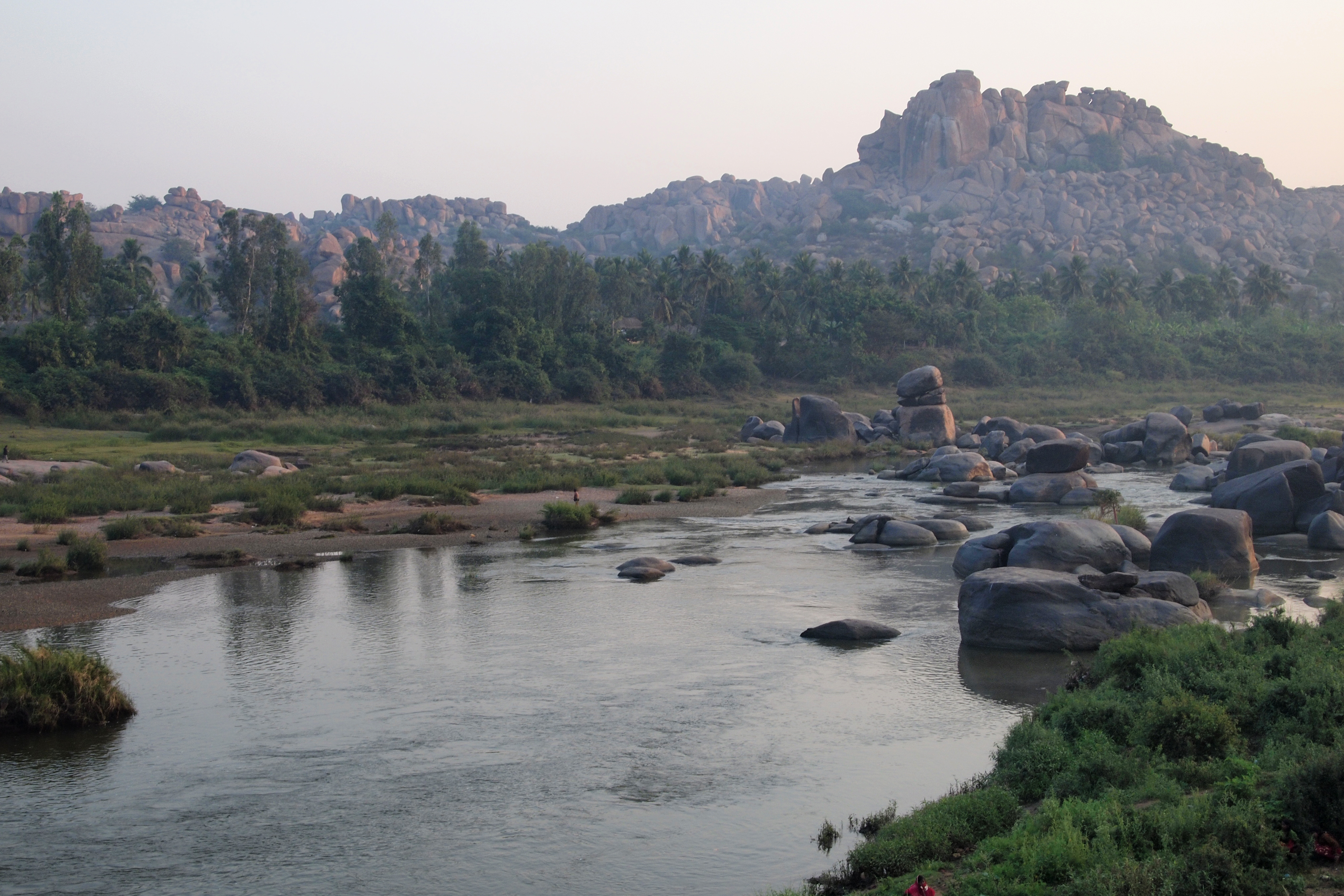

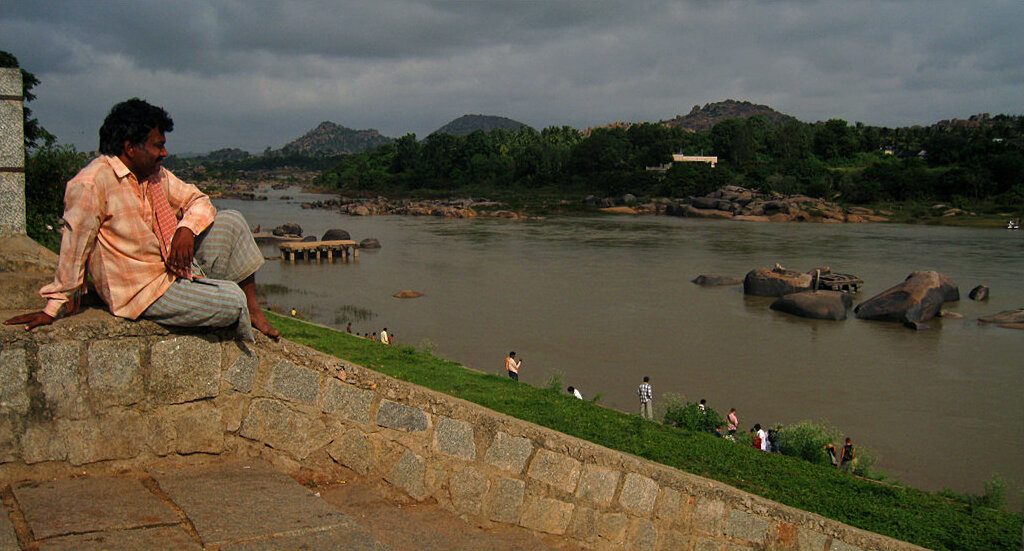
Contemplating the river, in Hampi

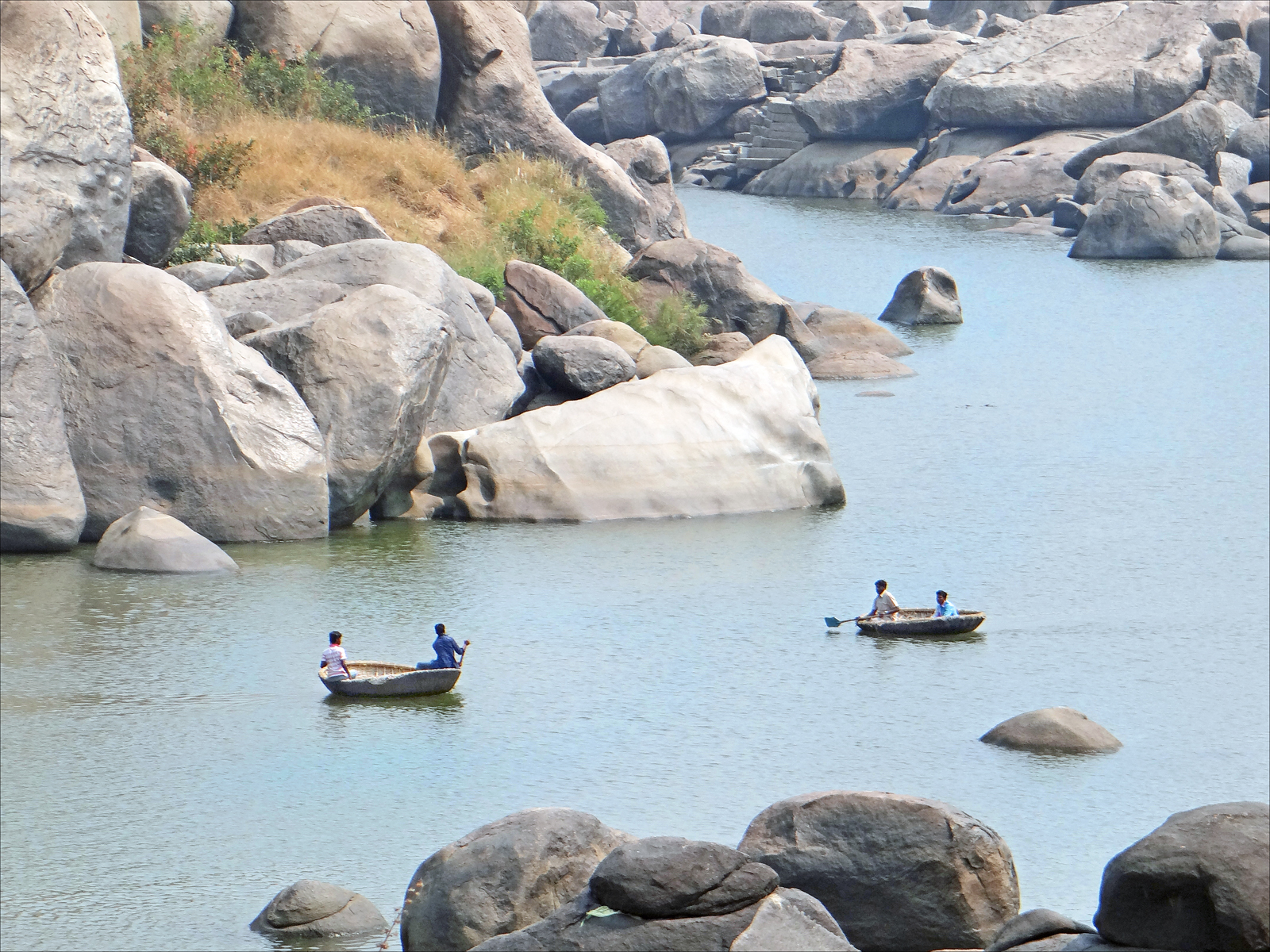
Near Hampi

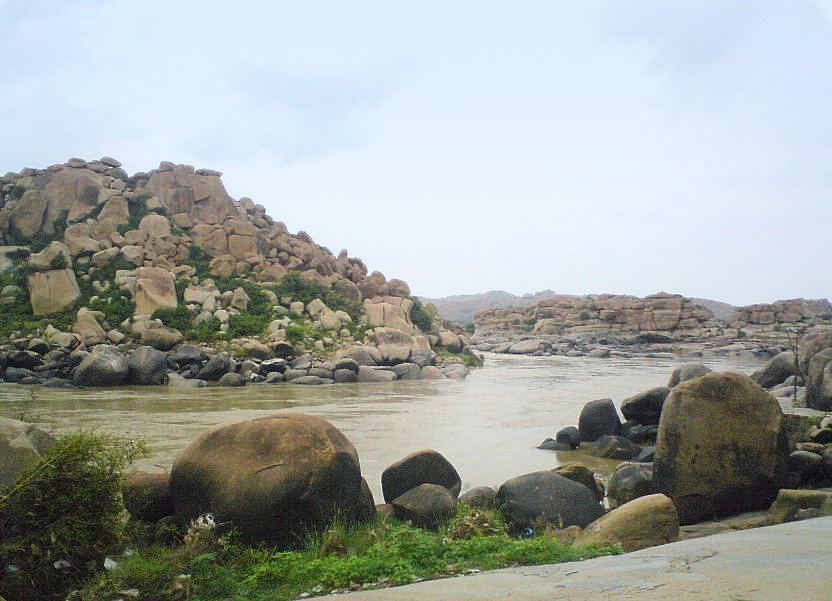
Tungabhadra Basin

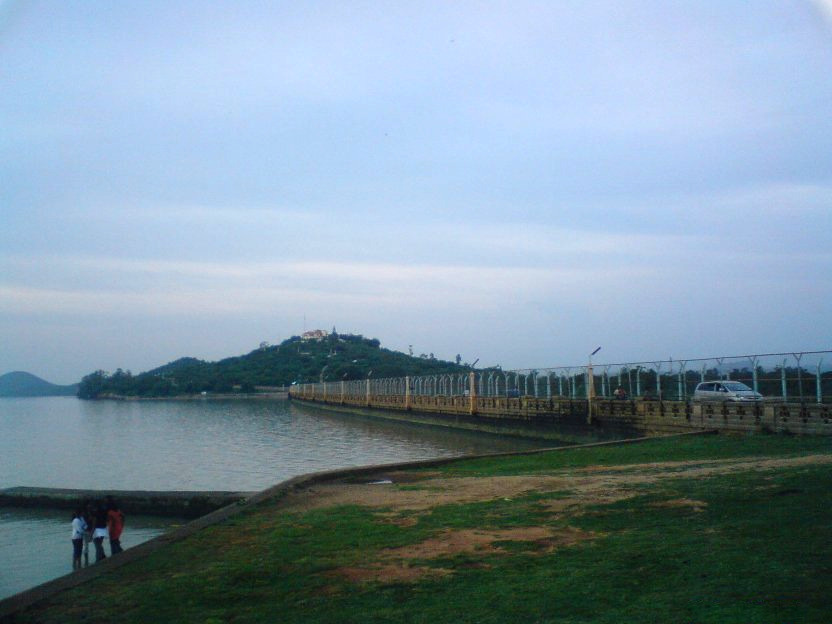
Tungabhadra Reservoir

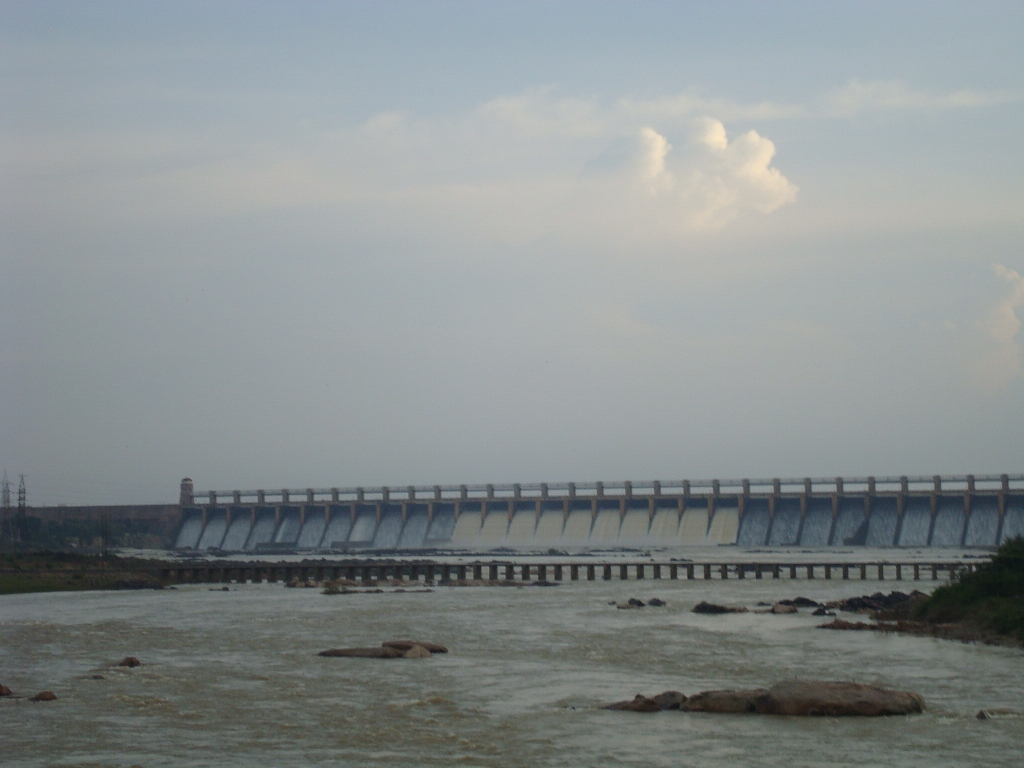
Tungabhadra Dam in Hospet

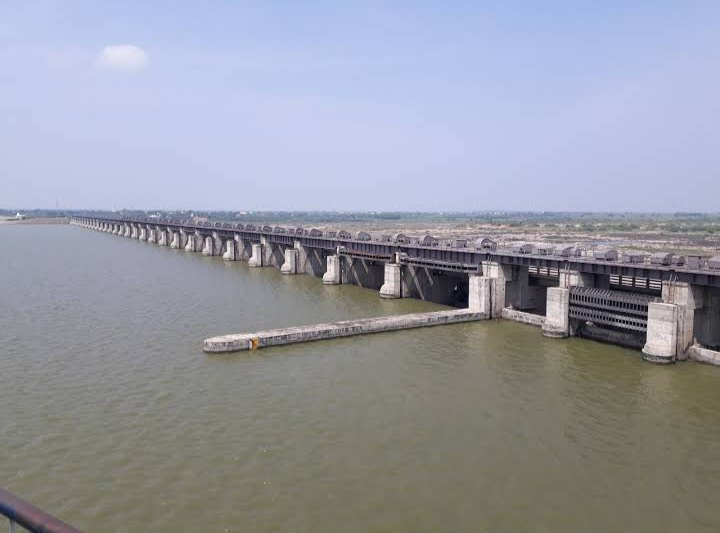
Sunkesula Barrage in Kurnool

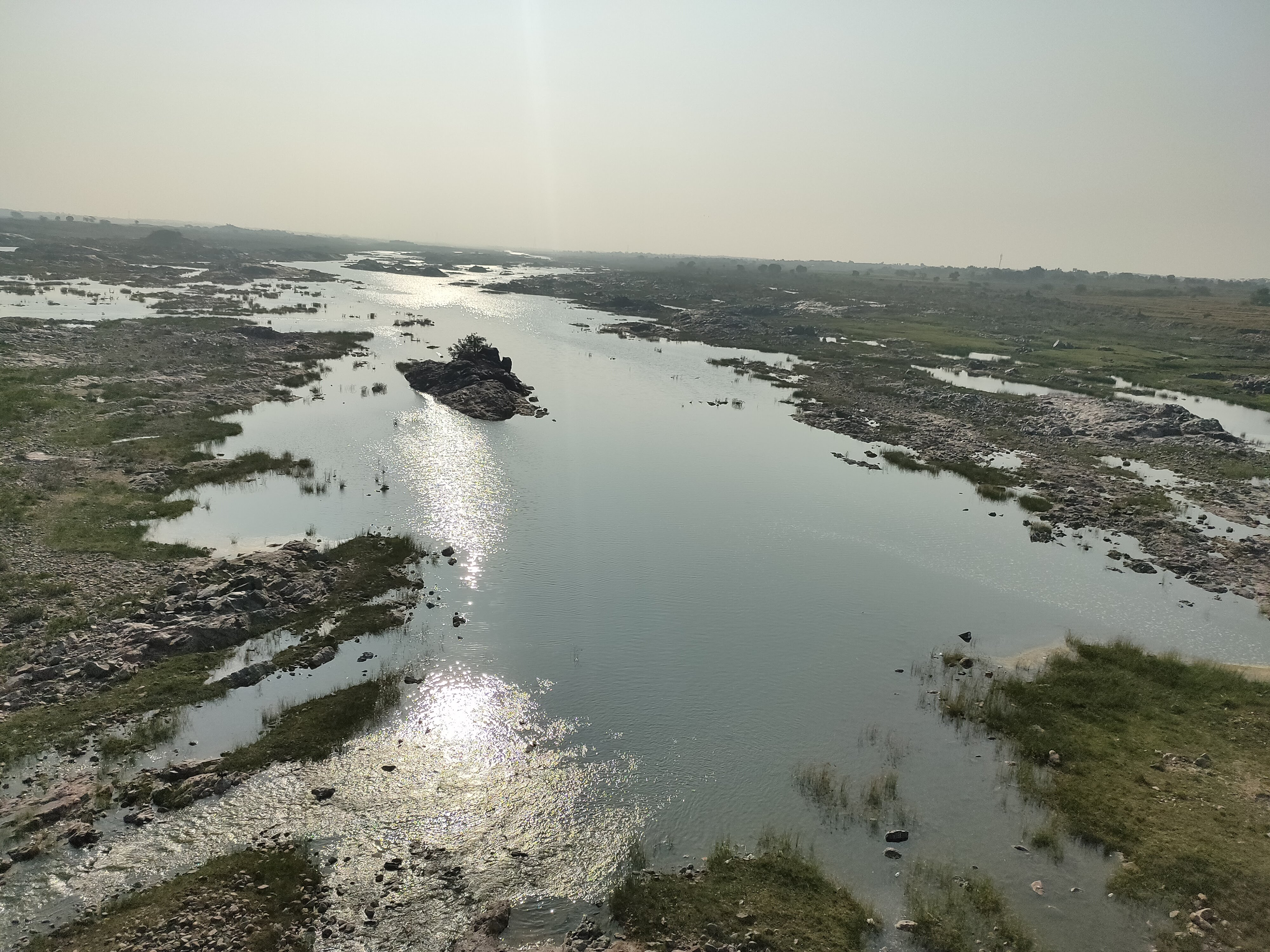
Dried up river during January 2020

== See also ==
- List of dams and reservoirs in India
- List of most polluted rivers
- Tungabhadra Pushkaralu
- Kishkindha
- Sunkesula Barrage
