= Jogulamba Temple, Alampur =

Hindu temple in India

Jogulamba Temple
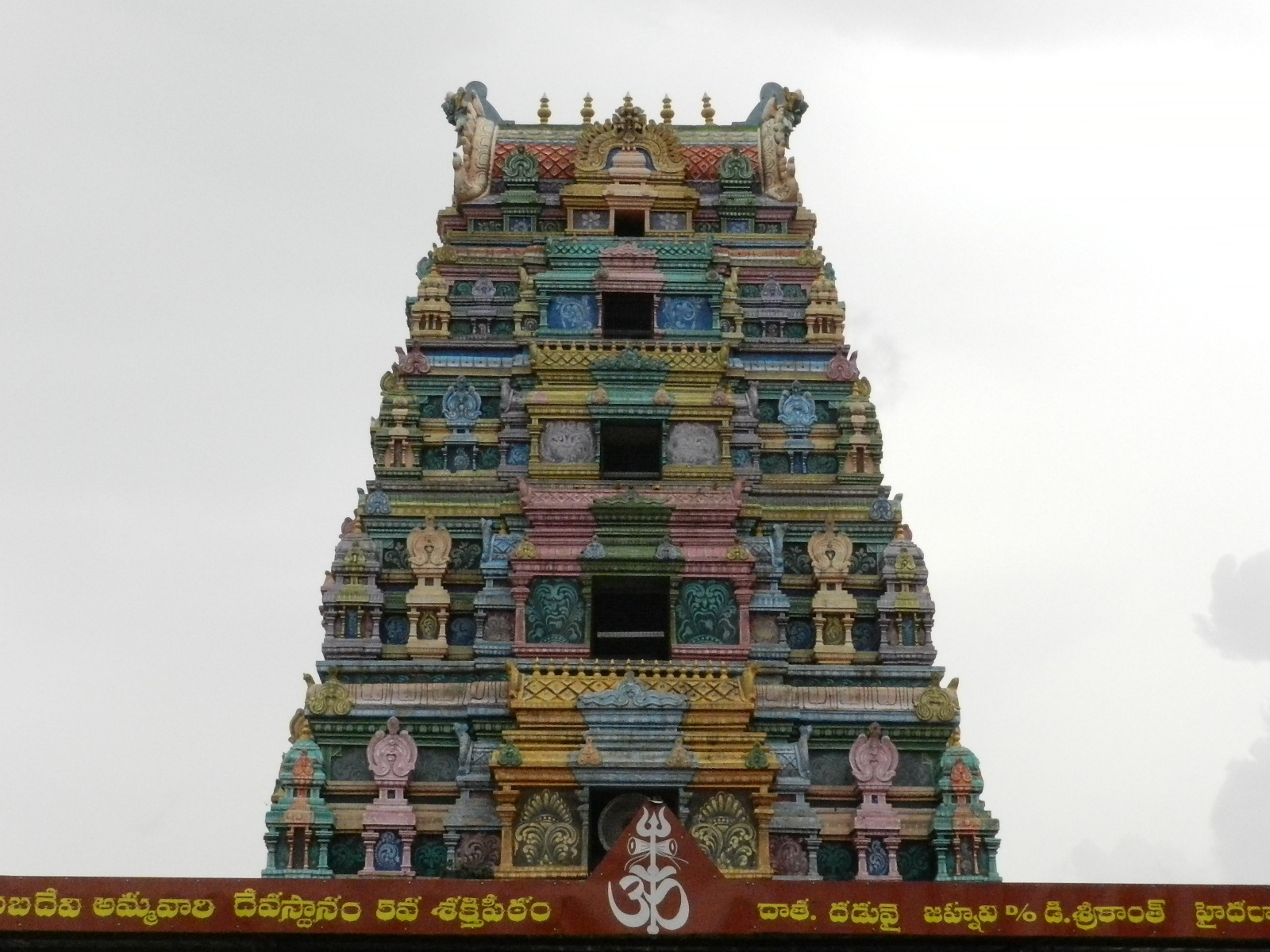
- Gopuram of Jogulamba temple

- Location in Telangana Jogulamba Temple, Alampur (Telangana)

Religion
- Affiliation: Hinduism
- District: Jogulamba Gadwal district
- Deity: Devi

Location
- Location: Alampuram
- State: Telangana
- Country: India
- Coordinates: 15°52′37.2″N 78°07′55.2″E

Architecture
- Style: Dravidian

Jogulamba Temple is a Hindu temple dedicated to Goddess Jogulamba, a form of Shakti located in Alampuram, Jogulamba Gadwal district,Telangana, India. The temple is one of the Maha Shakta pithas, a group of eighteen (Ashtadasa) temples considered the most significant shrines and pilgrimage destinations in Shaktism. It is the 5th Shakthi pitha of the 18 Shakthi pithas. Alampur is located on the banks of the Tungabhadra river near its confluence with Krishna river. Jogulamba temple is located in the same complex as that of the Navabrahma Temples, a group of nine Shiva temples built between the seventh and eighth century CE.

The principal deities at the Jogulamba temple are Jogulamba and Balabrahmeswara, a form of Shiva. In this temple Goddess Jogulamba is seen seated on a corpse with scorpion, frog, and lizard on the head. The word Jogulamba is said to be derived from the Telugu word Yogula Amma which means Mother of Yogis.The shrine's deity is regarded as Gruha Chandi (the protective goddess of the household and surrounding geography).

== Location ==
Alampur is located approximately 220 km south of Hyderabad and is accessible through Hyderabad-Bangalore highway and 26 km from Kurnool. Jogulamba temple is located in the same complex as that of the Navabrahma Temples, a group of nine temples dedicated to Shiva built in the seventh and eighth century CE by the Badami Chalukyas.

== History ==
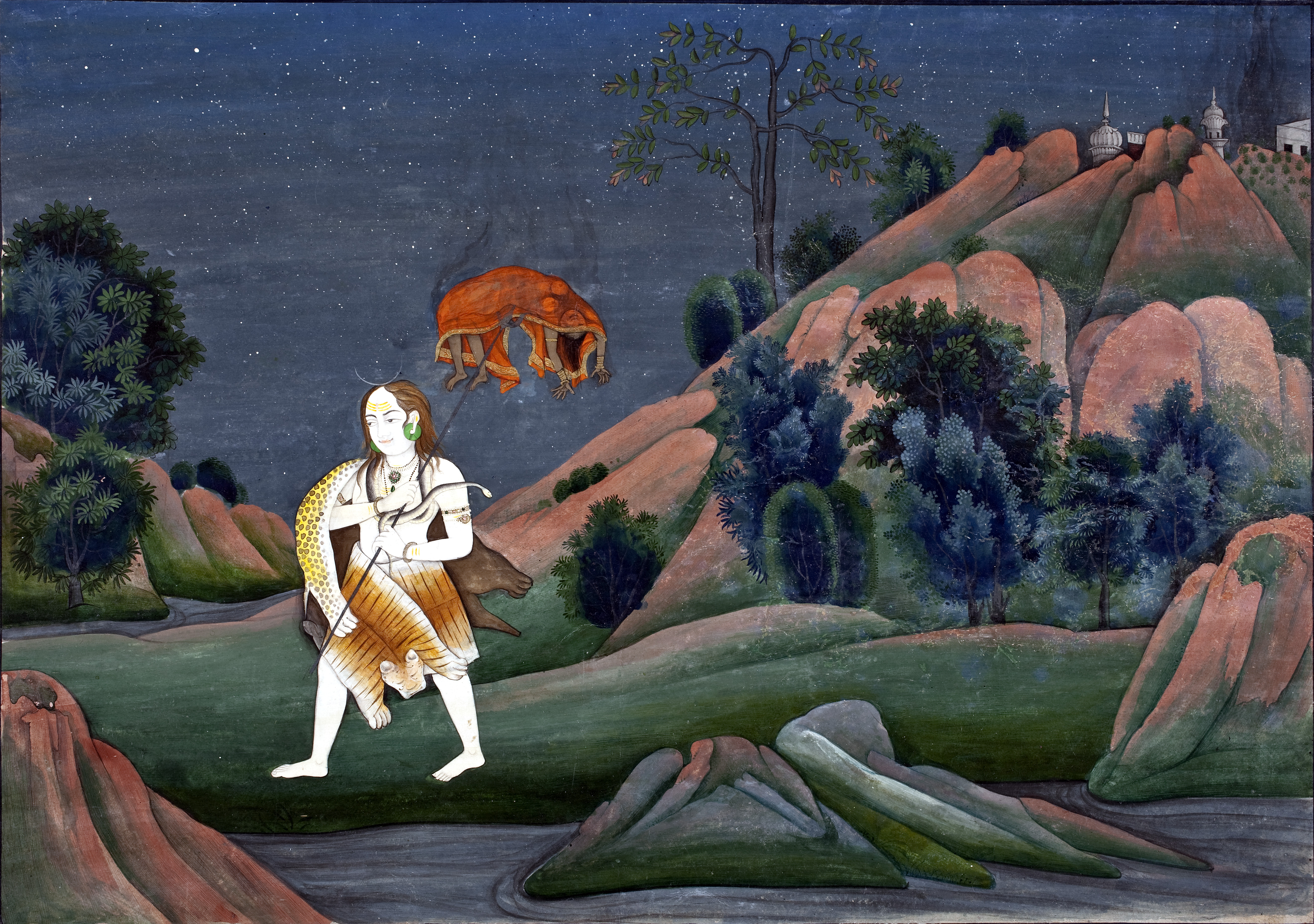
Shiva carrying the corpse of Sati Devi

Jogulamba temple is regarded as a Shakta pitha where Sati Devi's upper teeth fell. The mythology of Daksha yagna and Sati's self immolation is the origin story of Shakta pithas. The original shrine was erected during the 7th and 8th centuries CE under the patronage of the Badami Chalukyas.

In 1390 CE, the complex suffered severe structural destruction during military campaigns led by the Bahmani Sultanate. It was destroyed by the Muslim Bahmani Sultans in 1390 CE. Vijayanagara Emperor Harihara Raya II was said to have sent his army to fight the Bahamani Sultan's army and fortified the temple complex to stop further attacks.

Following the attack, local priests moved the central idol of Goddess Jogulamba to safety. For over six centuries, the idol was preserved and worshipped in a secluded chamber within the nearby Bala Brahma Temple. Jogulamba temple was rebuilt at its former location in 2005 and the original mūrti was installed in the new temple.

=== Iconography ===
Unlike peaceful iconography, Goddess Jogulamba is depicted in a fierce seated posture (*Ugra Rupa*) atop a corpse (*Shava*). The idol features detailed symbolic elements, including a lizard, scorpion, and frog depicted on the head, representing her power to destroy negative forces and grant spiritual *siddhi*.

- **Posture:** She is seated on a corpse (*Pretasana*), symbolizing absolute dominance over death and the material world.
- **Head Adornments:** The idol features a scorpion, a frog, and a lizard carved above her head, representing mastery over poison, pestilence, and subtle negative energies.
- **Associated Deities:** The main sanctum also houses idols of Ganesha, Veerabhadra, and the Saptamatrikas (seven mother goddesses).

=== Legend of Rasa Siddha ===
Local folklore links the foundation of the Alampur temples to a medieval saint named Rasa Siddha. According to legend, Rasa Siddha possessed alchemy powers that could transform stone into gold using liquid mercury (*Rasa*) and botanical extracts. He is said to have assisted King Pulakesi II in financing the construction of the nine Brahma temples.

== Religious Significance ==
According to Hindu mythology associated with Daksha Yajna, the Shakta pithas were formed when the body of Sati Devi was dismembered by Vishnu's Sudarshana Chakra while Shiva carried her body. The site at Alampur is believed to be the place where Sati's upper teeth fell.

The region is also known as the "Western Gateway of Srisailam" and is mentioned in the Skanda Purana.

== Festivals and Rituals ==
The temple follows traditional Shakta and Shaiva ritual procedures:

- **Navaratri:** The annual Navaratri (Vasantha and Sharad Navaratri) festivals draw significant pilgrim gatherings, featuring special *Alankarams* (decorations) and *Chandi Homas*.
- **Maha Shivaratri:** Celebrated in conjunction with the adjacent Balabrahmeshwara Temple, marking the union of Shiva and Shakti.
- **Daily Worship:** The temple maintains daily morning and evening *darshan* hours, accompanied by ritual *Aarti* offerings.

== Tourism and PRASAD Scheme ==
In 2019, the Ministry of Tourism, Government of India, included the Jogulamba Temple under the **PRASAD** scheme (Pilgrimage Rejuvenation And Spiritual Augmentation Drive) to fund local heritage preservation, pilgrim amenities, and infrastructure development.

== See also ==
- Alampur Navabrahma Temples
- Sangameswara temple, Kurnool
- Papanasi Temple
- Shakta pithas

== Gallery ==
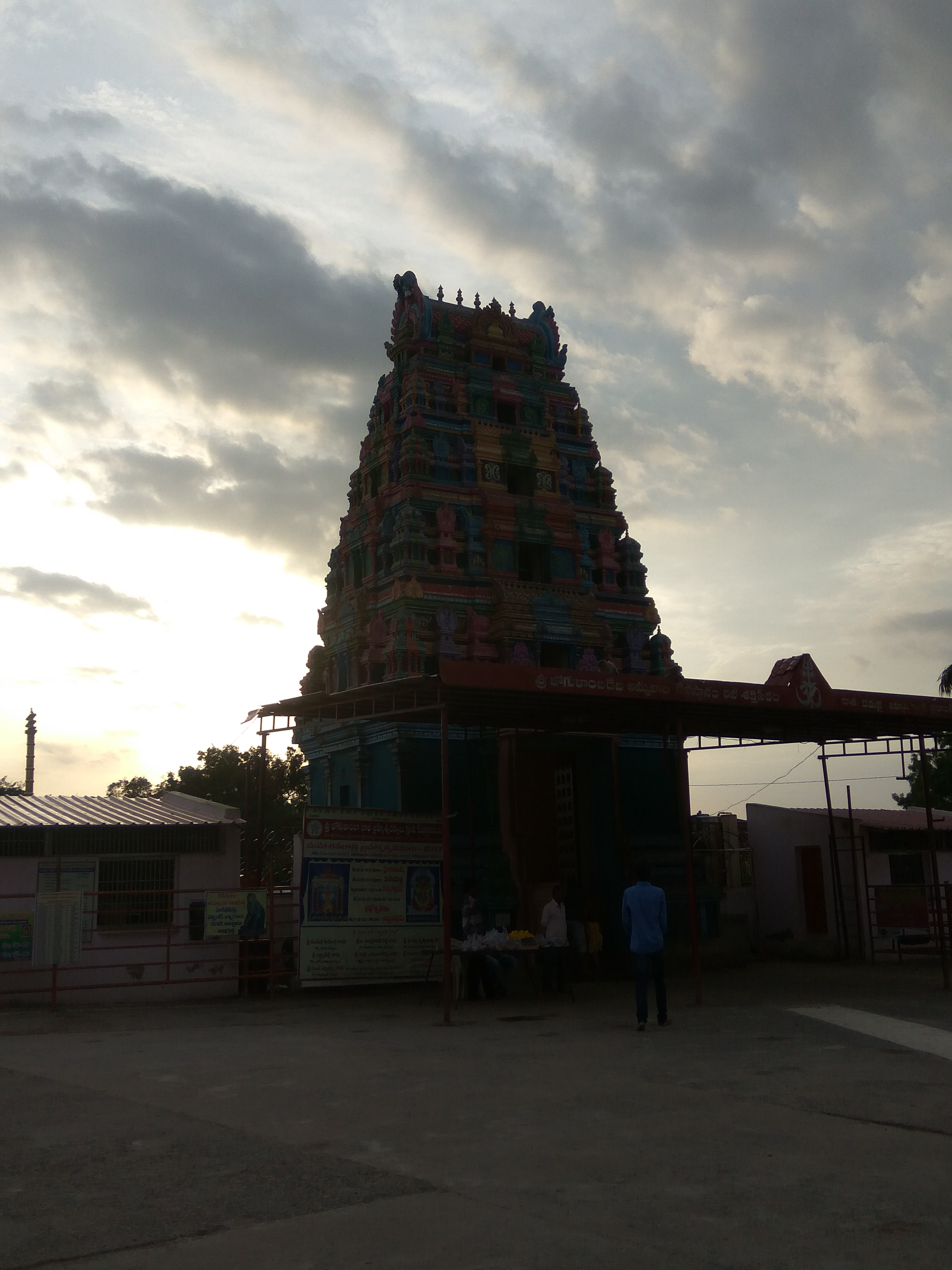
Silhouette of Jogulamba temple

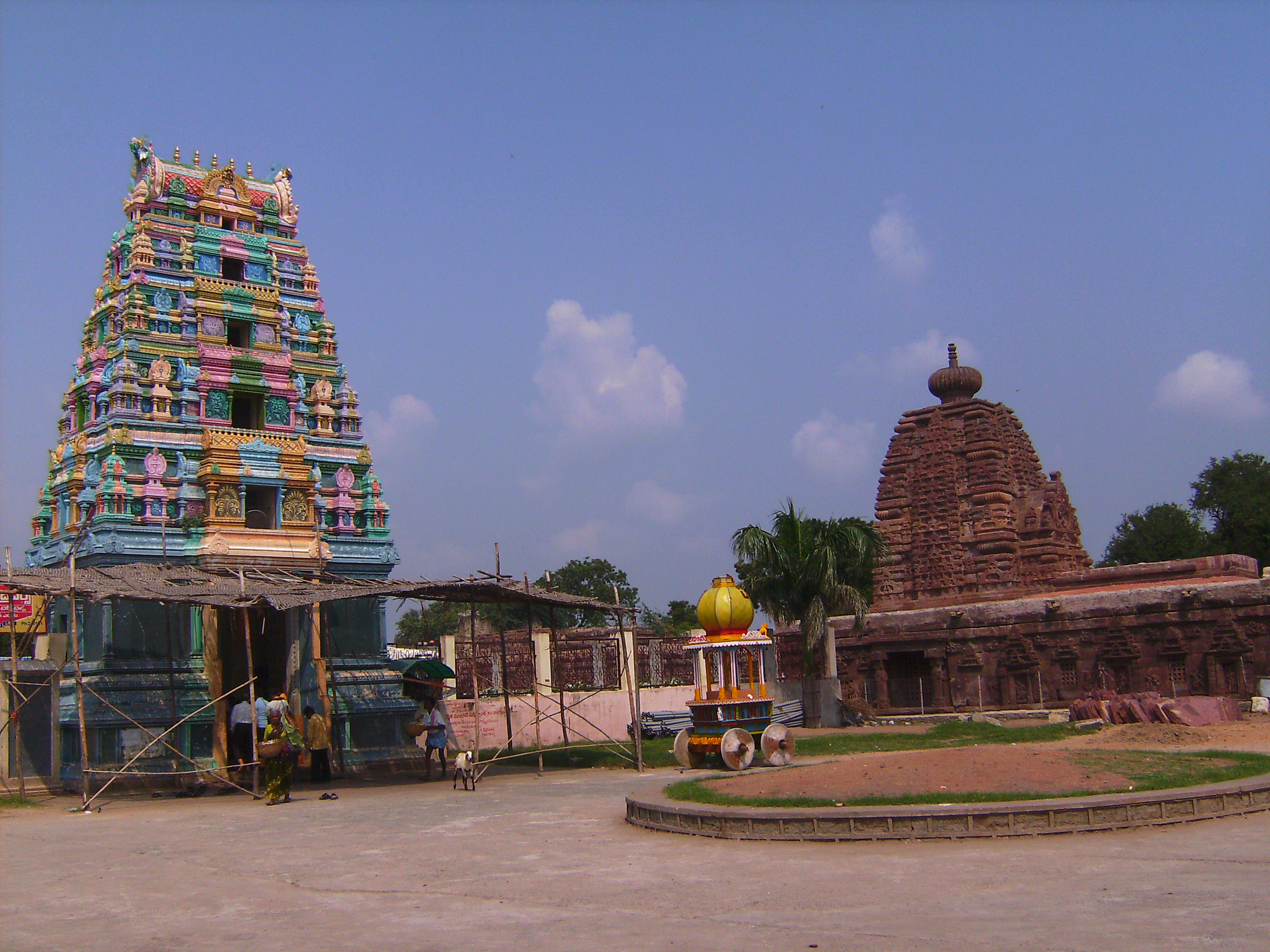
Jogulmba temple near the complex of Navabrahma temples

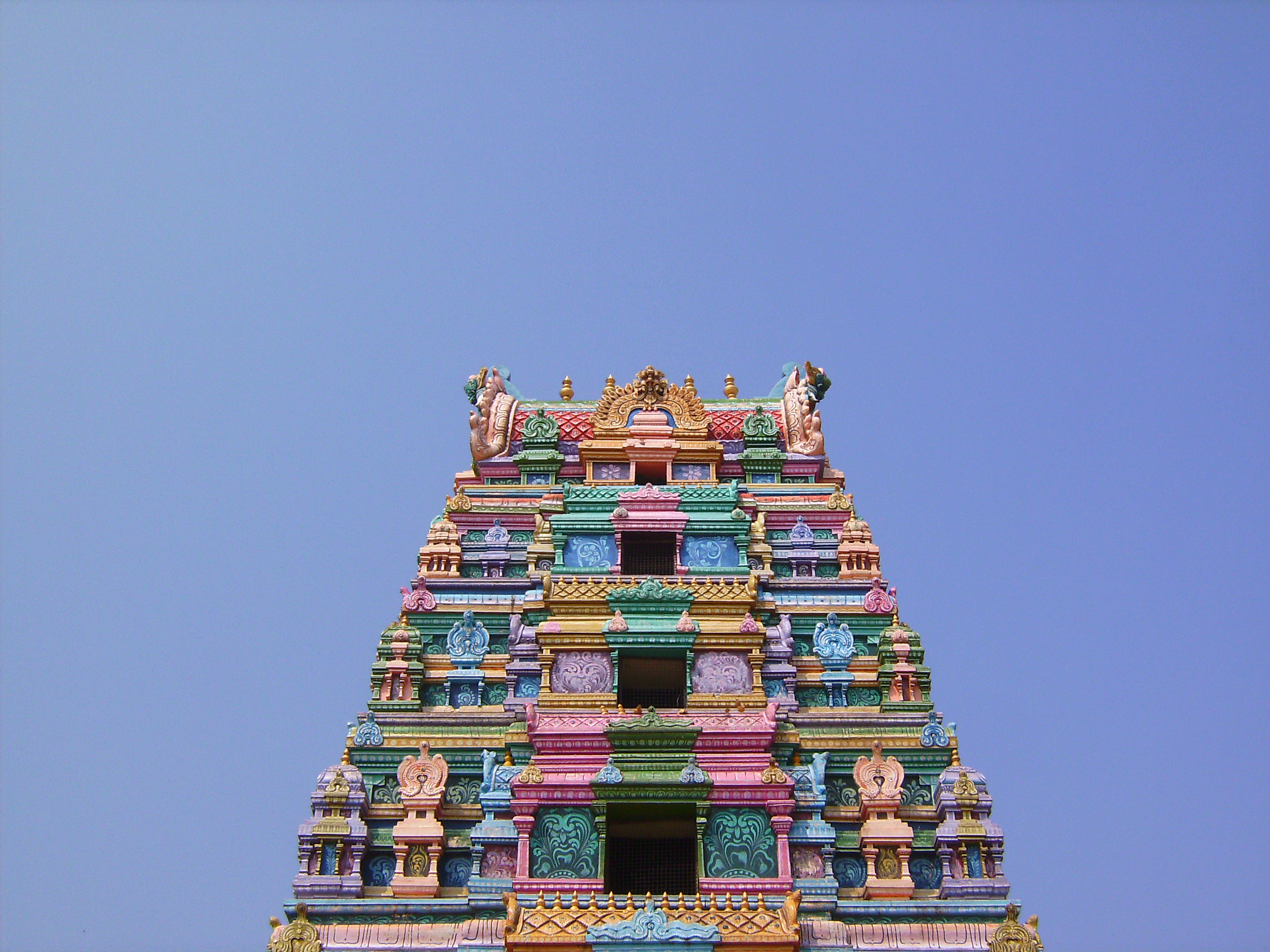
Temple gopuram

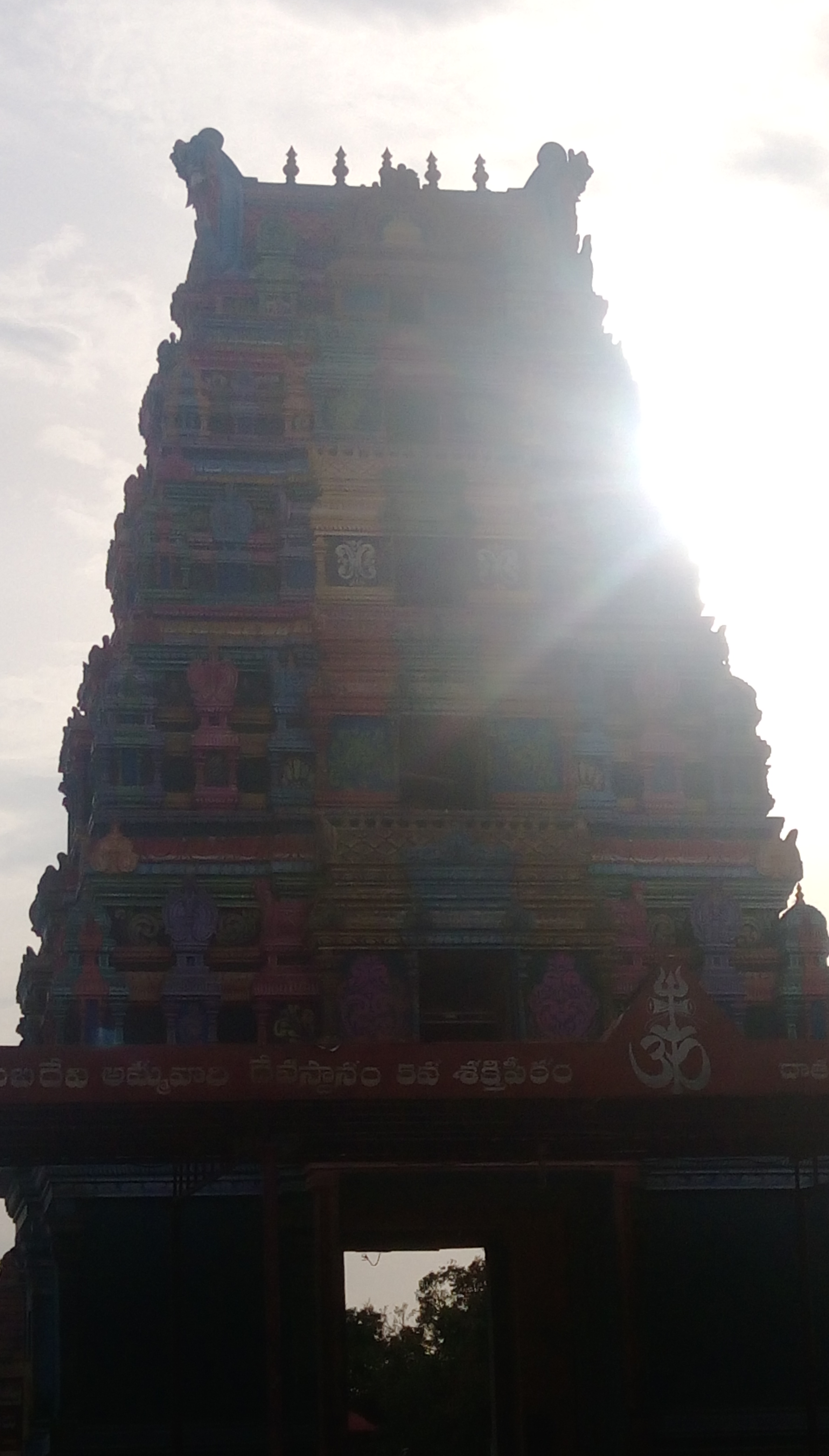
Temple gopuram in the evening

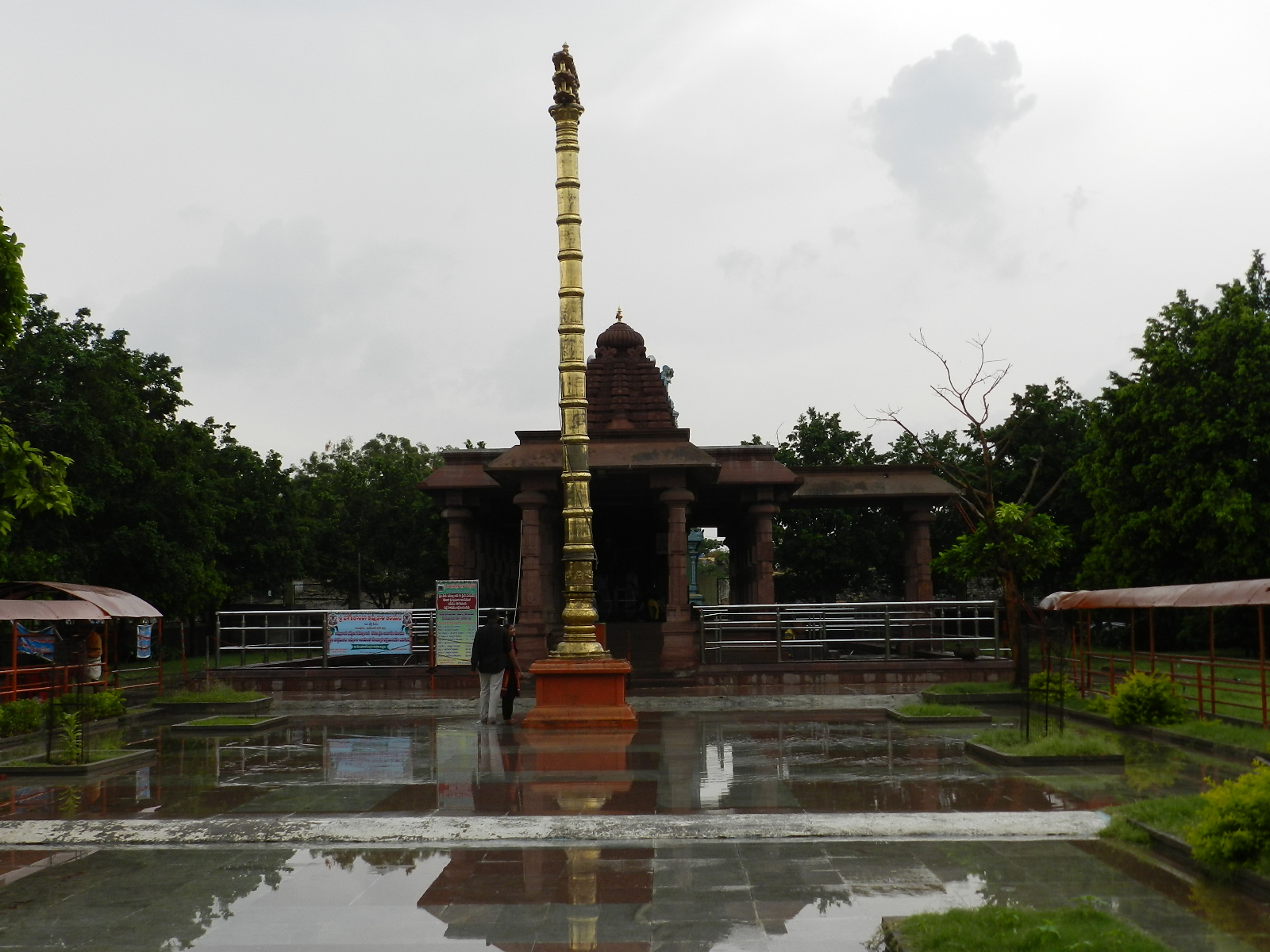
Dhwaja Stambham of Jogulamba temple

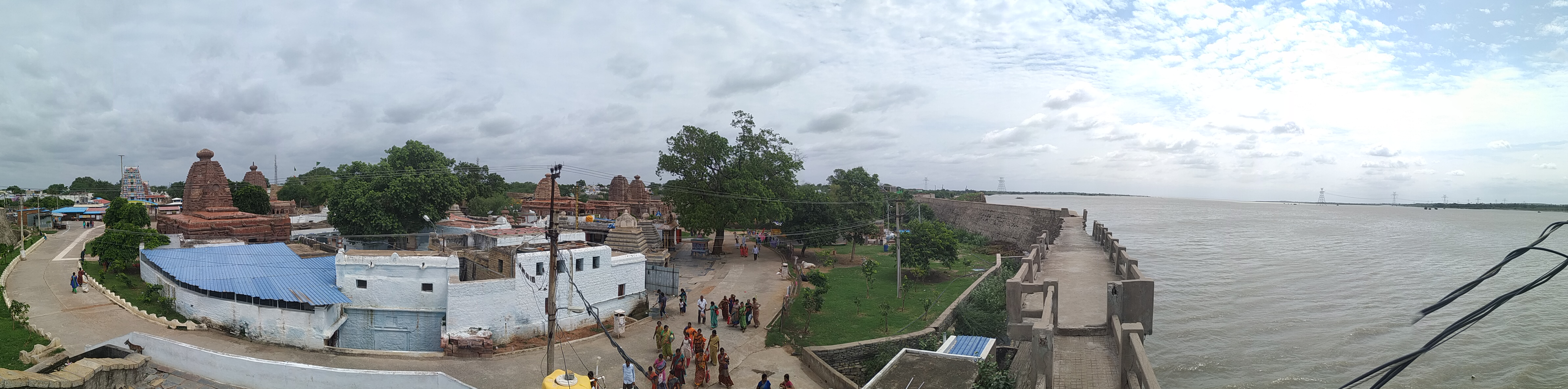
Panoramic view of the temple cluster; Jogulamba temple in the left corner
