= Gajanur =

Gajanur may refer to:

== Places ==
- Gajanur, a place in Karnataka, India
- Gajanur, a place in Tamil Nadu, India

== Film(s) ==
- Gajanura Gandu, a 1996 Indian Kannada film
