= Haluvalli =

- Village
- Country: India
- State: Karnataka
- District: Chikmagalur

Population (2011)
  - Total: 348

Languages
  - Official: Kannada
- Time zone: UTC+5:30 (IST)

Haluvalli is a village in Chikmagalur district, Karnataka, India. and is located on the banks of the river Bhadra. Haluvalli lies 87 Kilometres South-west of Chickmagalur

== Demographics ==
Per the 2011 Census of India, Haluvalli had a total population of 348; of whom 174 are male and an equal number female.

== How to reach ==
5 Kilometers from Kalasa, 10 Kilometer from Horanadu

Plenty of KSRTC buses from Bengaluru to Horandu which connects to Haluvalli.

== Places to see ==
- Shri Subrahmanyeshwara swamy temple
- Bhadra River
- Bhadra River Bridge
- Abbi Falls (Haluvalli-Horanadu Road)
- Eduruvare Gudda
- Aane Gudda (Also known as Kurne Gudda)
