= Gangamoola =

Hill in Karnataka, India

Coordinates: 13.249°N 75.156°E

Gangamoola is a hill in the Chikkamagaluru district of the state of Karnataka, India. Also known as Varaha Parvata, it is one of the hills in the Western Ghats range and is known for being the source of three rivers, Tunga, Bhadra and Netravathi.

== Geography ==
Gangamoola is a part of the Gangamoola-Aroli-Gangrikal range of the Western Ghats. Having an altitude of 1458 meters above sea level, the hill is within the boundaries of the Kudremukh National Park. The hill is thickly forested and receives an annual rainfall of 575 cm. The area in the vicinity of the hill is rich in magnetite-quartzite deposits which yield iron ore.

== Biodiversity ==
Gangamoola is a part of the Kudremukh biodiversity sub-cluster of the Western Ghats which has been nominated to receive the designation of a World Heritage Site by UNESCO. A survey conducted by the ornithologist Davidar in 1980 recorded 107 species of birds in the Kudremukh-Aroli-Gangamoola tract. The presence of a large number of bird species is due to trees like Myristica dactyloides that are favoured by birds.

== Origin of rivers ==
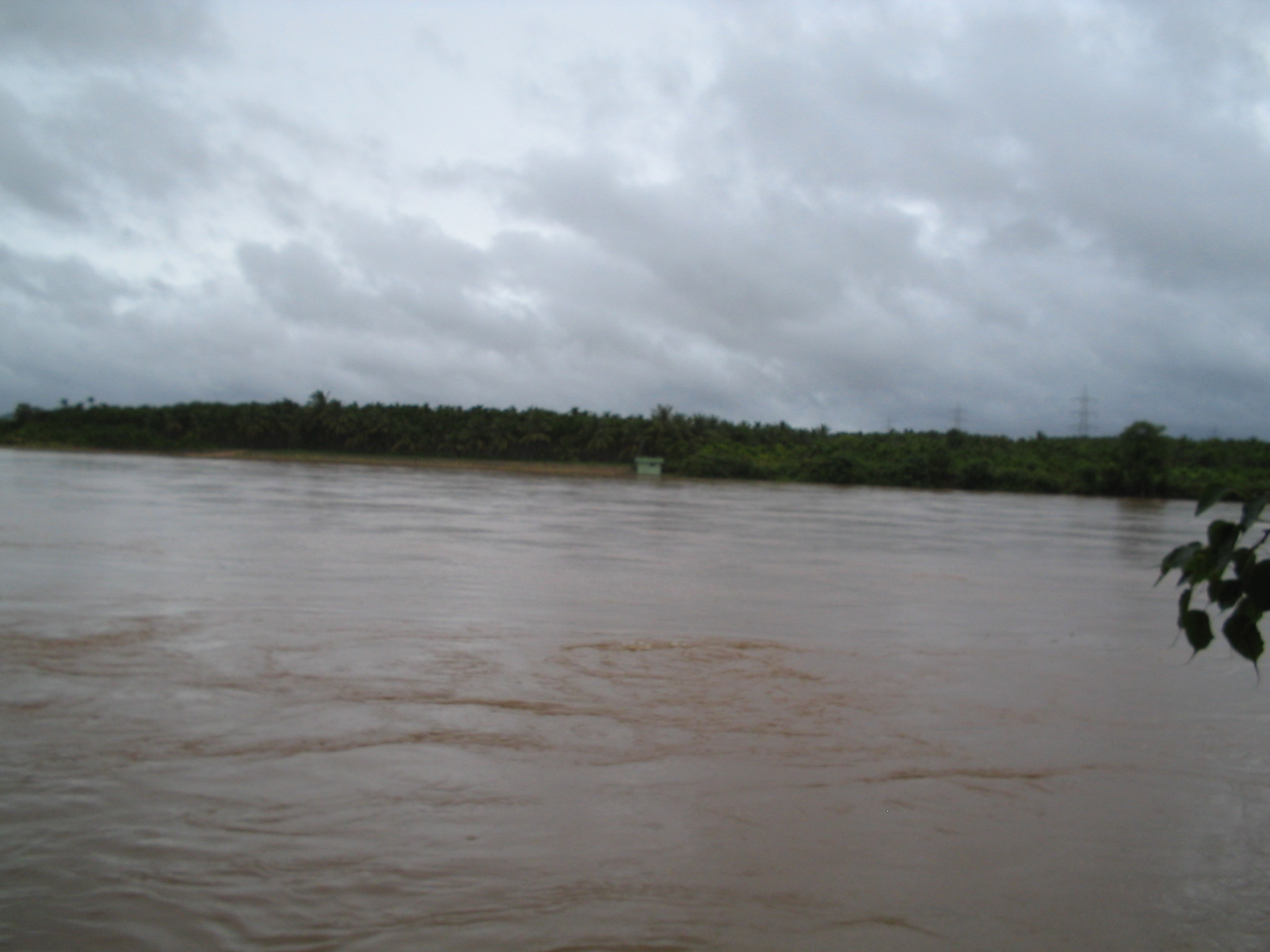
Tunga River, which originates at Gangamoola

Gangamoola is the origin of three rivers, Tunga, Bhadra and Netravathi.

Tunga

From its origin, the Tunga flows in a north-easterly direction passing the towns of Sringeri, Thirthahalli and Shimoga. A dam has been constructed across it at Gajanur. After covering a total distance of 147 km, it joins the Bhadra at Koodli near Shivamogga and forms the Tungabhadra river.

Bhadra

From its origin, the Bhadra river first flows east and then north-east passing the town of Bhadravathi. After travelling a distance of 178 km, it joins the Tunga at Koodli.

Netravathi

From its origin, the Netravathi flows west, passing the towns of Dharmasthala and Mangalore before joining the Arabian Sea.

== Issues ==
=== Iron ore mining ===
Iron ore was being mined in this area by the Kudremukh Iron Ore Company Ltd (KIOCL) despite the area being part of a national park. Environmentalists raised concerns about this, since they felt that the mining was disturbing the sensitive ecological balance in the region and also polluting the rivers, mainly the river Bhadra. The Supreme Court of India gave a ruling that the company should stop its mining operations and, in accordance with that decision, the mining was stopped on 31 December 2005.
