= Sangameswaram =

Hindu temple dedicated to Lord Shiva

The Sangameswara temple is a Hindu temple in the Nandyal district, Andhra Pradesh, India. It is located near Muchumarri at the confluence of the Krishna and Bhavanasi rivers, in the foreshore of the Srisailam reservoir, where it is submerged for part of the time, surfacing when the water level recedes to a sufficient degree. It was first submerged after the Srisailam Dam was constructed in 1981, and first surfaced in 2003.

The temple's wooden Lingam, Sangameshwaram, is believed to have been installed by Dharmaraja, the eldest of the Pandavas, after their visit to Srisailam Mallikarjuna temple. The temple is considered a place of religious sanctity due to being built at the confluence of seven rivers and remain visible for two months. (Bhavanasi, Krishna River and five rivers that merge into it beforehand, namely, Veni, Tunga, Bhadra, Bheemarathi and Malapaharini).
