= Yantrodharaka Hanuman Temple, Hampi =

Hindu temple of Hanuman in Hampi, Karnataka, India

Yantrodharaka Hanuman Temple
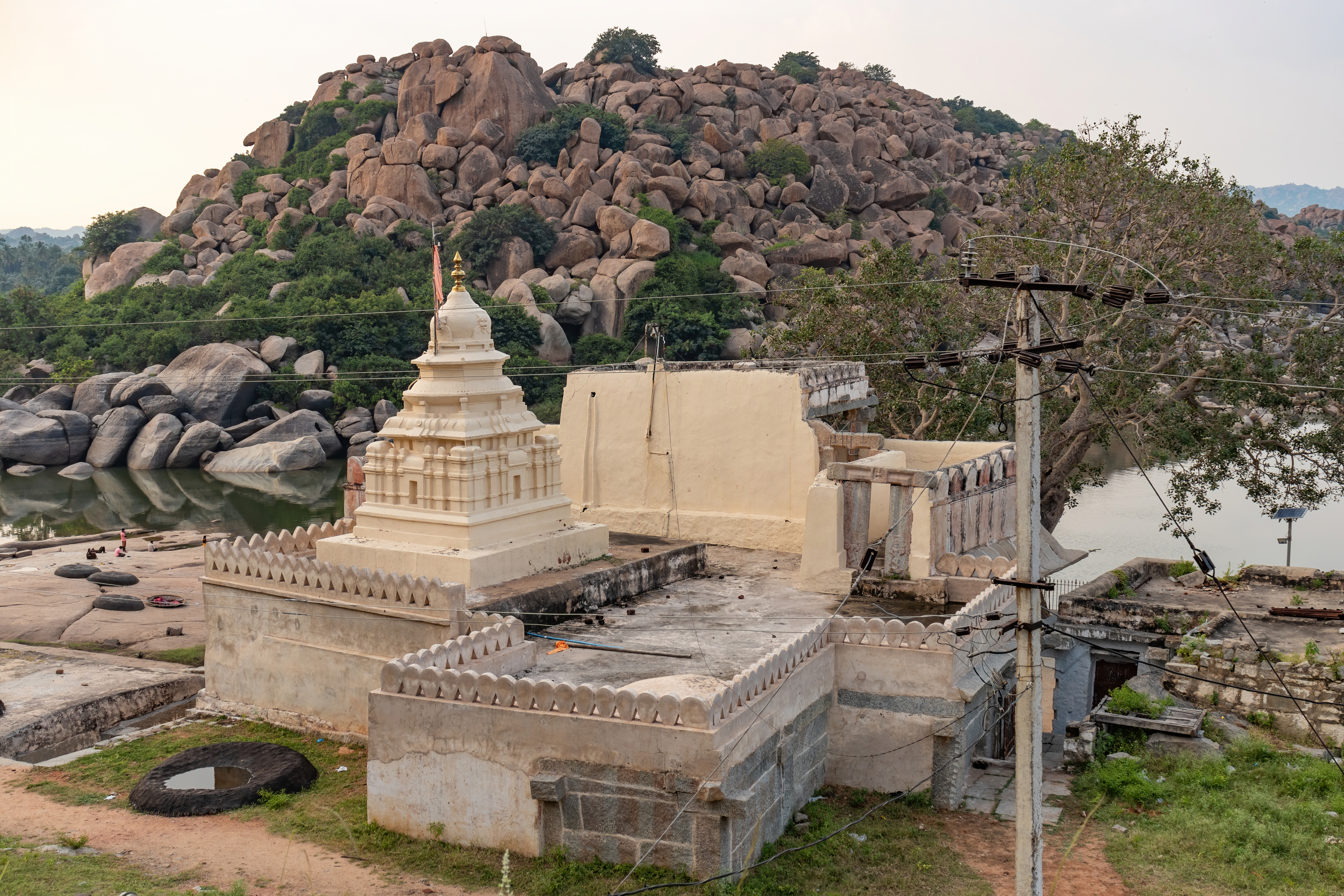
- Yantrodharaka Hanuman Temple, Hampi

Religion
- Affiliation: Hinduism
- Deity: Pranadeva (Hanuman)

Location
- Location: Hampi
- State: Karnataka
- Country: India

Architecture
- Creator: Vyāsa Tirtha
- Completed: 15th century C.E.

The Yantrodharaka Hanuman Temple (also known as Pranadeva Temple), is a Hindu temple dedicated to Hanuman which is situated in the town of Hampi, Karnataka, India. The shrine of Yantrodaraka Hanuman was eulogised by Vyasaraya a Madhva saint. There is a temple dedicated to Lord Rama called Kodandarama Temple near the Hanuman temple which stands as an evidence of Rama's and Hanuman's union in this place. The temple is located at hill top on the banks of Tungabhadra River in Hampi, Karnataka. Legend also says that, Lord Rama and Hanuman met for the first time here on a hill called Malyavana hill.

== Idol ==
Idol is depicted on a granite boulder. Hanuman is shown seated in padmasana within the center of ShaTkoNa Yantra (Six Cornered Yantra) which is known as Yantra. His right hand is held in Vyakhyanamudra and the left hand is held in Dyanamudra. He wears Kiritamukuta, and other usual ornaments on body. Over yantra carvings of 12 monkeys holding tails of one another as they face backwards. It is a representation of the 12 days of prayers that Sri Vyasaraja did before the Lord blessed him.

== Installation by Vyasaraja ==
The Yantrodharaka Hanuman idol has been installed by Vyasatirtha. Vyasaraja has also composed a short hymn to this Lord, which is called Yantrodharaka Hanuman Stotra.
