= Annapoorneshwari Temple =

Hindu temple in Karnataka, India

Adishaktyatmaka Sri Annapurneshwari Devi Temple - Sri Kshetra Horanadu
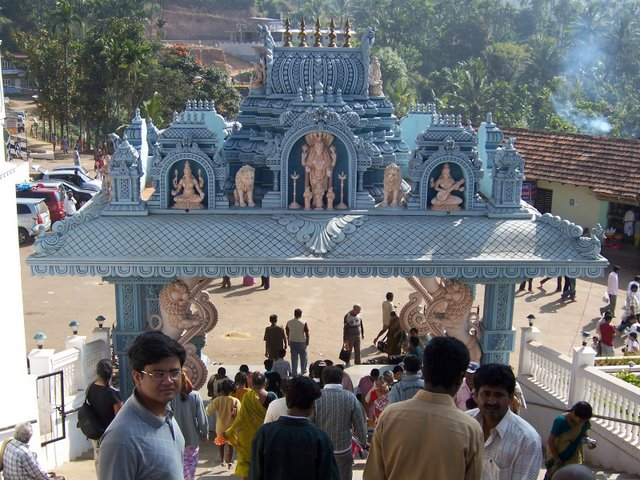
- Temple entrance

- Location in Karnataka

Religion
- Affiliation: Hinduism
- District: Chikmagalur
- Deity: Annapoorneshwari (Parvati)

Location
- Location: Horanadu
- State: Karnataka
- Country: India
- Interactive map of Adishaktyatmaka Sri Annapurneshwari Devi Temple - Sri Kshetra Horanadu
- Coordinates: 13.2705°N 75.3414°E

Architecture
- Creator: Agasthya

Website
- http://srikshetrahoranadu.com/

The Annapoorneshwari Temple is a Hindu temple dedicated to the goddess Annapoorneshwari (Annapoorna), located at Horanadu, Karnataka, India, 100 km from Chikmagalur in the thick forests and valleys of the Western Ghats of Karnataka. It is situated on the banks of river Bhadra.

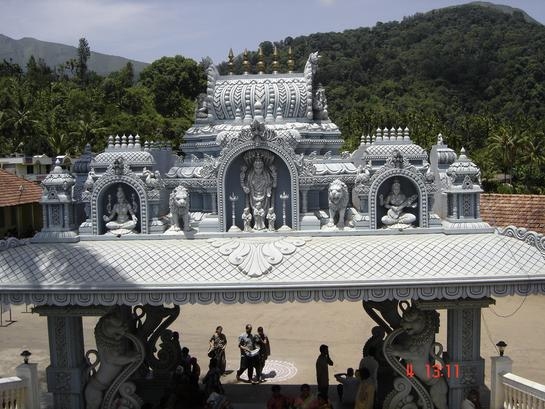
Mahadwara (meaning:Main entrance)

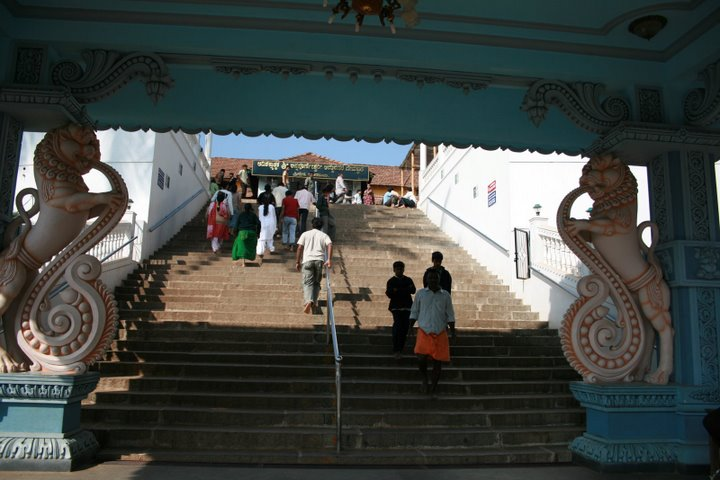
Annapoorneshwari Temple Entrance

== See also ==
- Marikamba Temple, Sirsi
