= Kalasa =

- Town
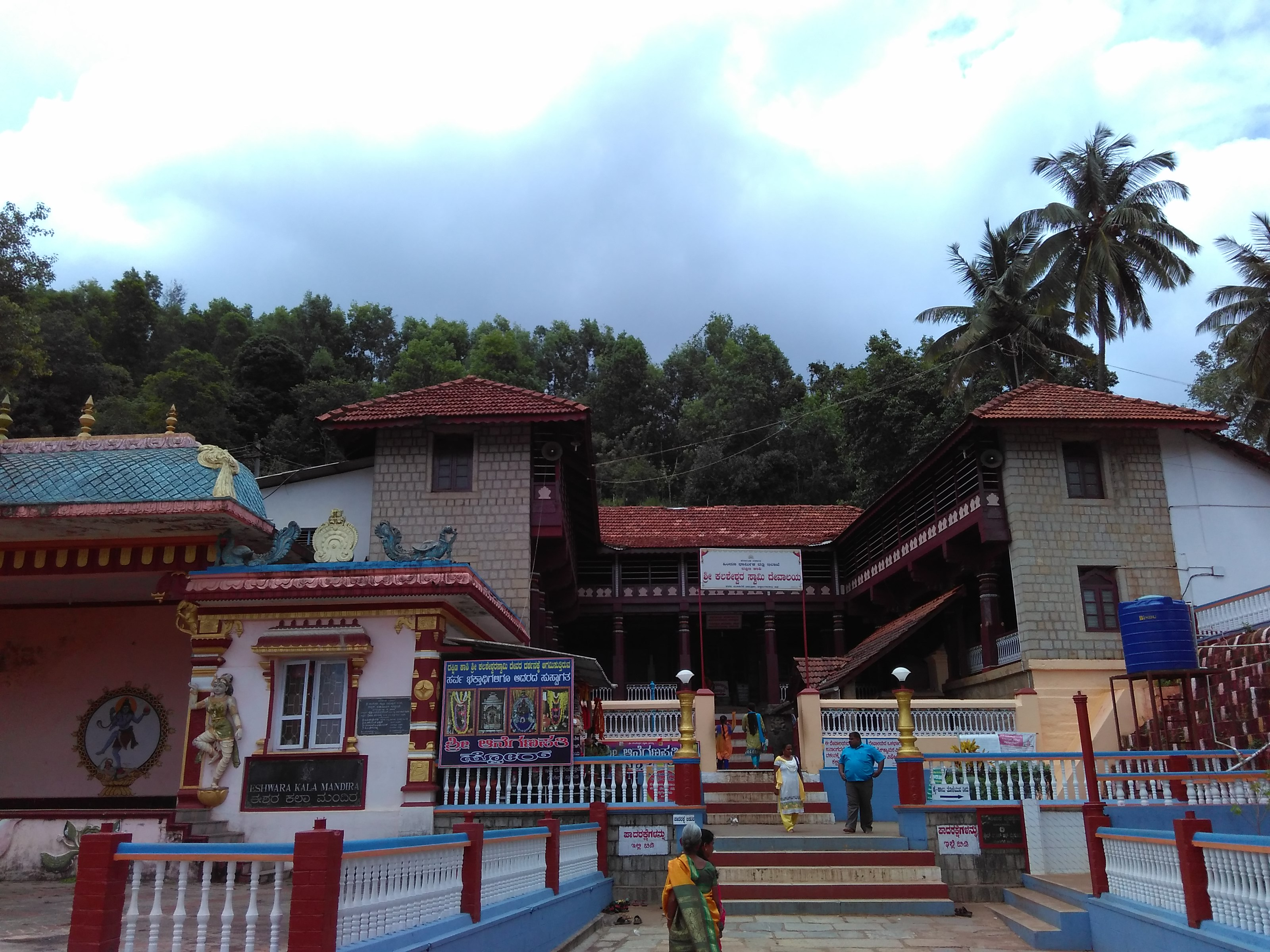
- Kalaseshwara Temple

- Location in Karnataka, India
- Coordinates: 13.2340°N 75.3553°E
- Country: India
- State: Karnataka
- District: Chikmagalur
- Region: Malenadu

Government
  - Body: Grama panchayat

Area
  - Total: 64 km^{2} (25 sq mi)
- Elevation: 807 m (2,648 ft)

Population (2011)
  - Total: 11,198
  - Density: 170/km^{2} (450/sq mi)
- Time zone: UTC+5:30 (IST)
- PIN: 577 124
- Telephone code: 08263
- Vehicle registration: KA-18

Kalasa is a taluk located in Chikmagalur district in Karnataka. Kalasa is home to the Chandranatha Jain Basadi and Kalaseshwara Temple dedicated to Shiva. Kalasa lies 92 Kilometres West of Chickmagalur and is located on the banks of the Bhadra River. Kannada language is spoken here.

== Santara dynasty ==
The history of this region is also associated with the Santara dynasty, a medieval ruling dynasty located in present-day Karnataka, India.

Edgar Thurston mentions that the Santaras were among the powerful Bunt chiefs who seem to have exercised control over a greater part of the Tulu Nadu before the rise of the Vijayanagara Empire. The Santara dynasty and Alupa royal family both adherents of Jainism, are recorded to have maintained matrimonial alliances. The Santaras built a number of Jain monuments and patronised Jainism for nearly a thousand years in the Tulu Nadu and Malenadu region of Karnataka. During this period, the Santara ruler Veera Pandya Bhairarasa erected the monolith of Bahubali in Karkala.

== Religious and tourist places ==
Temples

- Chandranatha Jain Basadi, Kalasa
- kalaseshwara Temple
- Girijamba Temple
- Sri Subramanya temple, Haluvalli
- Sri Chennakeshava temple, Balehole
- Annapoorneshwari Temple, Horanadu

Other places

- Kyatanamakki hill station
- Meruthi gudda
- Samse tea estate
- Kudremukh

== Culture and Tradition ==
Due to the proximity of Kalasa to the coastal districts, cultural appropriation has taken place. Many cultures, including Deity worship, Bhutakola, Yakshagana, and coastal arts have been part of the native culture. Along with this, the use of Tulu language is also prevalent.

== Transport ==
Kalasa lies amidst Malenadu at a distance of 119 km from Mangalore, 310 km from Bengaluru and 85 km from district headquarters Chikmagalur. Horanadu is at a distance of 9 km and Kudremukha National park is at a distance of 23 km from Kalasa. Kalasa can be reached by KSRTC and private buses. Nearest major railway junctions are Mangaluru Junction towards west and Kadur towards east at a distance of 120 km and 125 km, respectively. The nearest airport is Mangalore International Airport previously known as Bajpe airport situated in Mangalore.

Major highways passing through Kalasa are SH-66 and SH-106.

== Rainfall ==
In the year 2024, Kalasa hobli received an annual rainfall of 4,057 millimetres (159.7 in)
