= Sunkesula Barrage =

Barrage in Kurnool, Andhra Pradesh

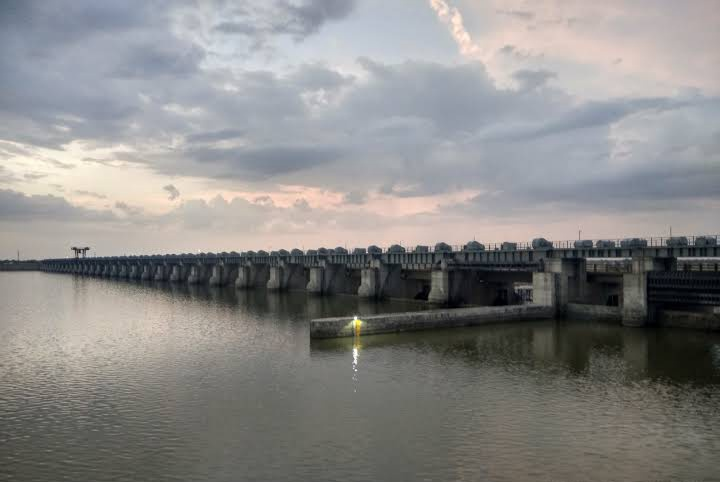

- Location within Andhra Pradesh
- Official name: Tungabhadra Barrage
- Country: India
- Location: Kurnool, Kurnool District, Andhra Pradesh && Rajoli, Jogulamba Gadwal district, Telangana
- Coordinates: 15°52′57″N 77°49′38″E
- Purpose: Irrigation & Water supply
- Construction began: 1858
- Opening date: 1861
- Owner: Government of Andhra Pradesh

Dam and spillways
- Type of dam: Barrage
- Impounds: Tungabhadra River
- Height: 163 m (535 ft)
- Length: 1,300 m (4,265 ft)
- Spillways: 30
- Spillway type: Controlled
- Spillway capacity: 2,08,363 cumecs

Reservoir
- Creates: Sunkesula Reservoir
- Total capacity: 1.25 Tmcft
- Catchment area: 172 km^{2} (66 sq mi)
- Surface area: 60.32 km^{2} (23.29 sq mi)
- Website irrigationap.cgg.gov.in/wrd/dashBoard

Sunkesula is one of the largest barrages across the Tungabhadra River in Kurnool district, Andhra Pradesh, India. It was built in 1861, during the British Raj], for transporting goods on the K. C. Canal.
