= Samse =

- village
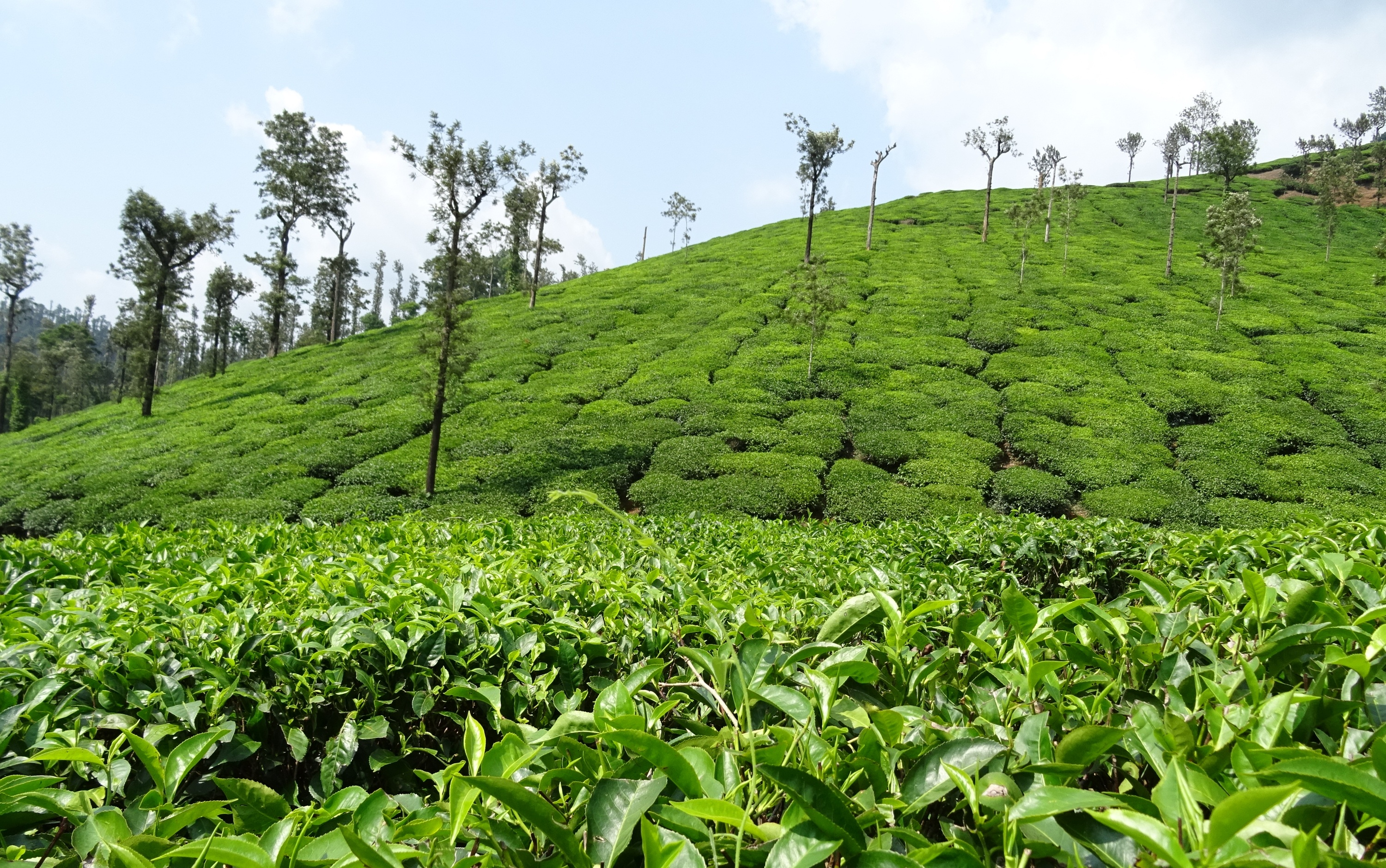
- Tea plantation near Samse

- Location in Karnataka, India Samse (India)
- Coordinates: 13.13°N 75.64°E
- Country: India
- State: Karnataka
- District: Chikkamagaluru
- Founder: Rahul
- Talukas: Mudigere

Population (2001)
  - Total: 5,687

Languages
  - Official: Kannada
- Time zone: UTC+5:30 (IST)

Samse is a village in the southern state of Karnataka, India. It is located in the Kalasa taluk of Chikkamagaluru district in Karnataka.

== Demographics ==
As of 2001 India census, Samse had a population of 5687 with 2933 males and 2754 females.

== See also ==
- Chikmagalur
- Mangalore
- Districts of Karnataka
