= Bhadra River =

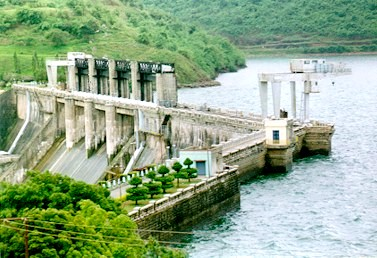
- Bhadra Dam near Bhadravati and Tarikere border

Location
- Country: India

Physical characteristics
- Source
  - location: Gangamoola, Chikmagalur district, Karnataka
- Mouth
  - location: Tungabhadra River, Koodli, Karnataka

The Bhadra is a river in Karnataka state in southern India.

It originates in Gangamoola near Kudremukha, Western Ghats (Sahyadri) range, and flows east across the southern part of Deccan Plateau, joined by its tributaries the Somavahini near Hebbe, Thadabehalla, and Odirayanahalla. It flows through the towns of Kudremukh, Kalasa, Horanadu, Haluvalli, Balehonnur, Balehole and Narasimharajapura. The Bhadra Dam is built across the river at BRP -Bhadravathi, Karnataka, which forms the Bhadra reservoir (186 ft). From here the river continues its journey through the city of Bhadravathi, Karnataka. The Bhadra meets the Tunga River at Koodli, a small town near Shivamogga. The combined river continues east as the Tungabhadra, a major tributary of the Krishna, which empties into the Bay of Bengal.

Bhadra at Vasishta Theertha, Kalasa.
