= Malur Srinivasa Thirumale Iyengar =

Indian civil engineer (1897–1976)

- Born: 1 December 1897; North Arcot District, Madras Presidency, British India
- Died: 2 September 1976 (aged 78); Bangalore, Karnataka, India
- Education: College of Engineering, Madras
- Awards: Padma Bhushan; 1956

Malur Srinivasa Thirumale Iyengar (1897–1976), also known as M. S. Thirumale Iyengar, was an Indian civil engineer known for his contributions to irrigation and hydroelectric infrastructure in India. He was awarded the Padma Bhushan in 1956 in recognition of his services to civil engineering.

Born on 1 December 1897 in the North Arcot District of Madras Presidency, Iyengar pursued a Bachelor of Engineering (B.E.) in Mechanical Engineering from Madras University, graduating in 1920. He later earned a Master of Engineering (M.E. Hons.) degree from the College of Engineering, Madras.

He joined the Indian Service of Engineers in 1922 and later worked in the Madras Public Works Department. One of his early assignments included work on the Mettur Irrigation Project, where he supervised the construction of a barrage across the Coleroon River and improvements to the Cauvery irrigation system. He worked as Professor of Mechanical Engineering for a brief period at College of Engineering, Guindy. From 1940 to 1952, he worked as Chief Engineer on the investigation of the Tungabhadra Dam Project. In 1953, Iyengar was appointed Chief Engineer of the Hirakud Dam Project. Later, in 1960, he was named Advisor to the Government of Mysore and Administrator of the Sharavathi Valley Hydroelectric Project.

Thirumale Iyengar also made significant contributions to professional organizations. He was an active member of the Institution of Engineers (India), serving as its President during 1952–53. He was also a member in the International Commission on Large Dams, serving on its Executive Committee and as Vice-President from 1951 to 1957. Additionally, he was elected President of the Central Board of Irrigation and Power in 1951.

In recognition of his contributions, Iyengar received the Padma Bhushan in 1956.

He died on 2 September 1976, in Bangalore.
