= K. C. Canal =

Irrigation canal in Andhra Pradesh, India

Coordinates: 15°52′56″N 77°49′44″E

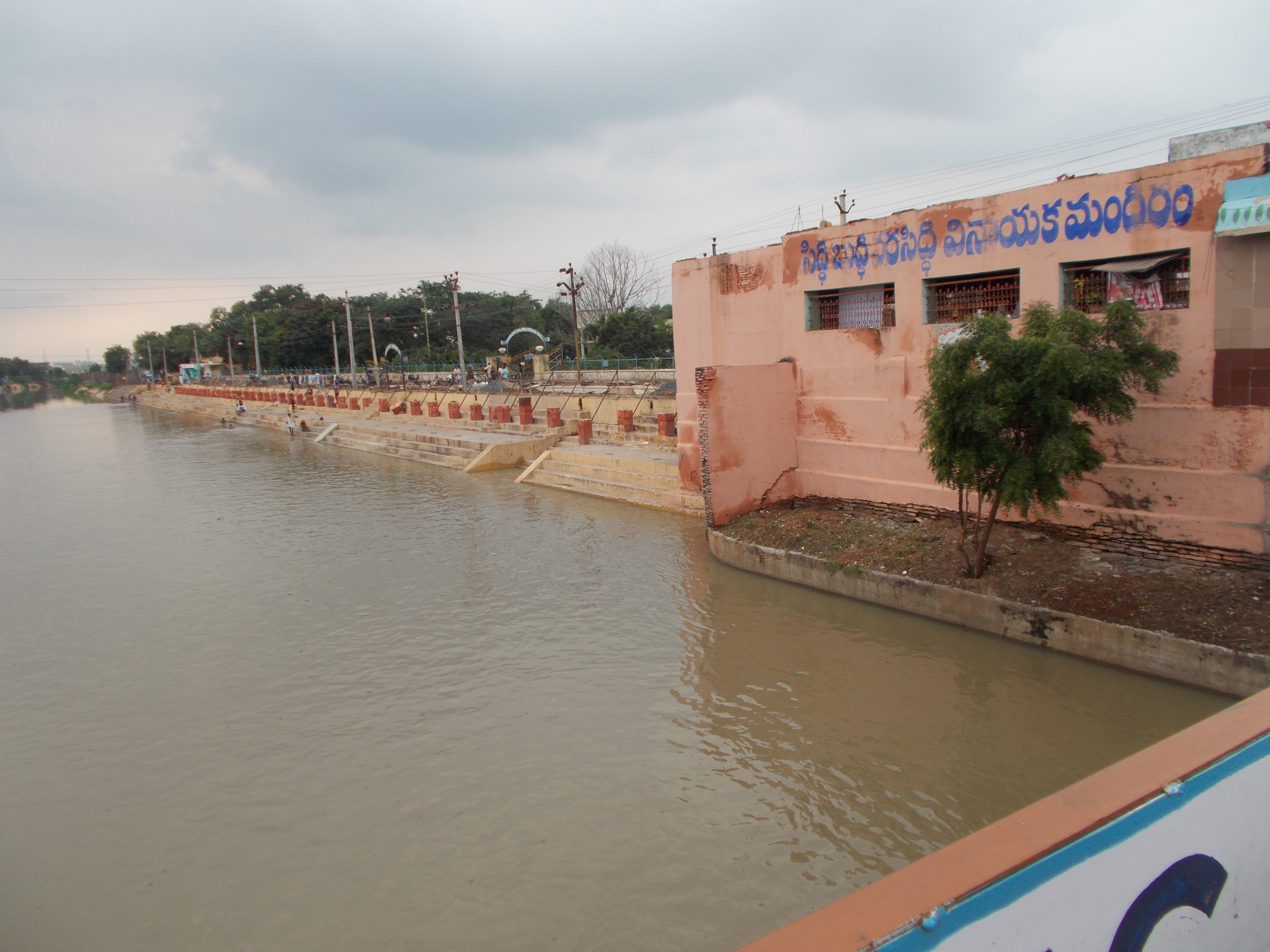
K. C. Canal near Kurnool

Kurnool Cuddappah Canal popularly known as K. C. Canal is an irrigation canal located in Kurnool and Kadapa districts in Andhra Pradesh, India.

== History ==
The K. C. Canal was constructed by the Madras Irrigation and Canal Company between 1863 and 1870 as an irrigation and navigation canal. This canal interconnects the rivers Penner and Tungabhadra. It starts from the Sunkesula barrage located on the Tungabhadra River near Kurnool.

The navigation system was abandoned during 1933 and the canal continued to be a major irrigation source. To improve the efficiency of the system, modernization of the entire canal and repairs/reconstruction of the structures is taken up under K. C. Canal modernization. The project is under construction to stabilize entire ayacut of K. C. Canal and to develop the gap ayacut of 60,000 acres. The canal presently irrigates nearly 1,70,000 acres with 40 Tmcft (thousand million cubic feet) water utilisation from the Krishna River.

== Assured water availability ==
Alternate water supply from Srisailam reservoir is provided via Srisailam right main canal constructed under Telugu Ganga project. Also water can be pumped and fed to K. C. Canal from the recently commissioned Muchumarri lift or Handri-Neeva lift canal pump house from the Srisailam reservoir when its water level (up to 798 ft msl) is below the minimum drawdown level of Pothireddypadu head regulator which also feeds Telugu Ganga, Srisailam right bank canal and Galeru Nagari projects. Although there is assured water allocation of 10 tmcft for this project, most of the water meant for KC canal is drawn though the escape channel at banacherla cross regulator and taken to Somasila project for use by Nellore district depriving Rayalaseema of its allocated water. Very little water reaches the actual K. C. Canal ayacut or the telugu ganga main canal ayacut which have very small capacity and are in disrepair.

== See also ==
- Krishna Water Disputes Tribunal
- Rajolibanda Diversion Scheme
- Arthur Cotton
