= Tunga River =

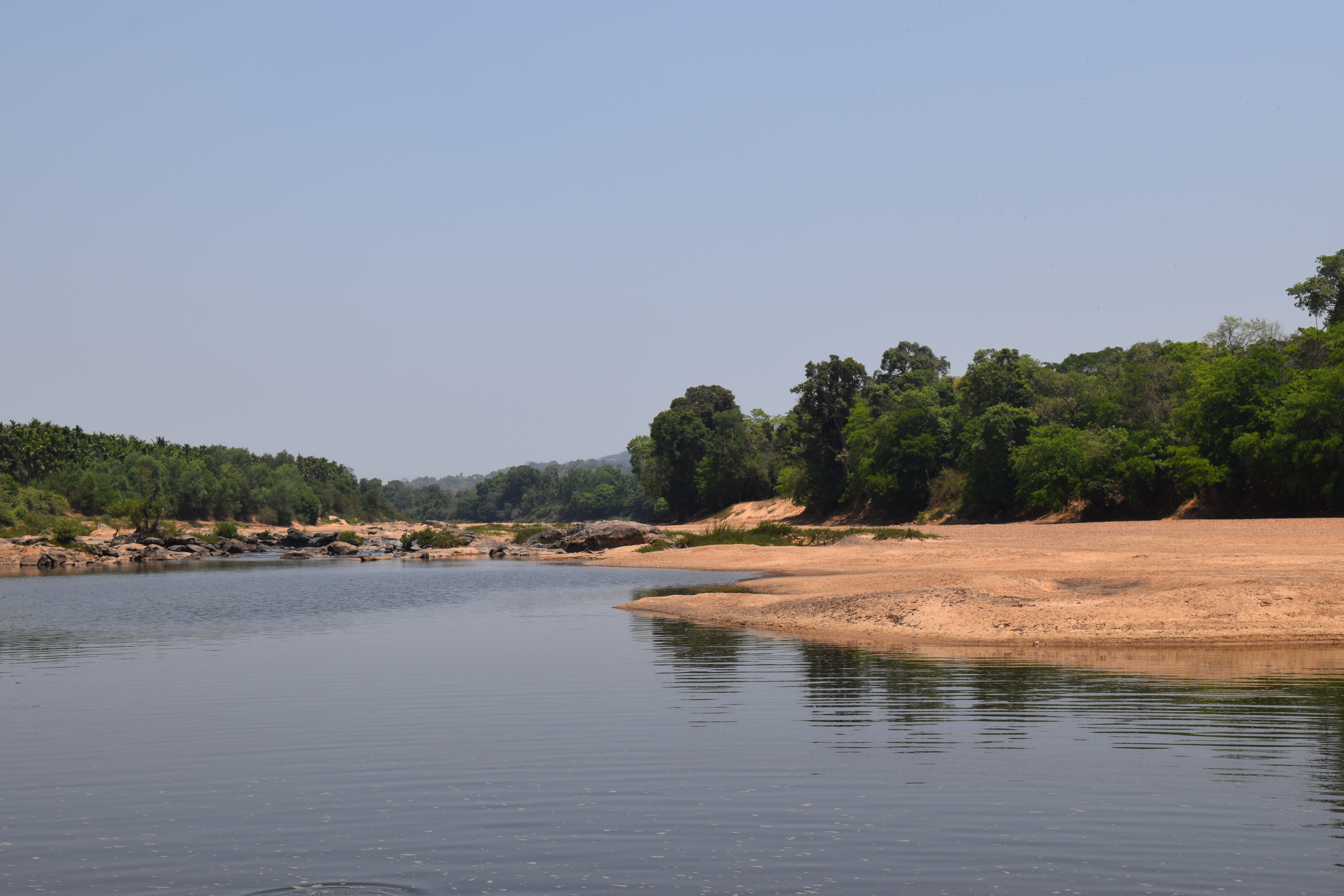
- River Tunga near Chibbalagudde, Thirthahalli

Location
- Country: India
- State: Karnataka

Physical characteristics
- Source: Gangamoola
  - location: Chikmagalur district, Karnataka, India
  - coordinates: 13°15′21.27″N 75°09′17.06″E
  - elevation: 1,236 metres (4,055 ft)
- 2nd source: Gurige
  - location: Chikkamagaluru district
  - coordinates: 13°16′13.15″N 75°12′45.32″E
  - elevation: 1,422 metres (4,665 ft)
- Mouth: Tungabhadra River
  - location: Koodli, Bhadravati, Karnataka, India
  - elevation: 578 metres (1,896 ft)
- Length: 147 km (91 mi)approx.

Basin features
- River system: Krishna

The Tunga River (alternatively spelled Thunga) is a river in Karnataka state, southern India. The river is born in the Western Ghats (Sahyadri Mountains) on a hill known as Varaha Parvata at a place called Gangamoola in Chikkamagaluru district. From here, the river flows through two districts in Karnataka - Chikmagalur District and Shimoga District.

It is 147 km long and merges with the Bhadra River at Koodli, a small town near Shimoga City, Karnataka. The confluence of the two rivers continues as Tungabhadra from this point on. The Tungabhadra flows eastwards and merges with the Krishna River in Andhra Pradesh.

It has a dam built across it at Gajanur, and a larger dam has been built across the combined Tungabhadra River at Hospet.

== Religious centres ==
Sringeri, on the banks of the Tunga, has several temples, the most important being the Śhārada Temple and the Vidyāśhankara Temple. Hariharapura is another religious centre on the bank of the Tunga River in the Chikkamagalur district.

== River front project ==
Karnataka took up a river front project in January 2024 at a cost of Rs.103 crore as part of Shivamogga Smart City.

== Pollution ==
Like many other rivers in India, the Tunga too suffers from pollution. In March 2025, the Karnataka State Pollution Control Board (KSPCB) revealed that seven sources are polluting the Tunga River. The study, submitted to the district administration and the KSPCB, said approximately 47.79 million litres per day (MLD) of sewage, with most of it allegedly generated by Shivamogga city, is being released into the river's catchment area as of December 2024.

Harakere, Uragadur, the stretch near Purle, Holebenavalli, Goravinakatte, SPM Road, and Thevarchatnahalli, all in Shivamogga district, are the seven identified sources of pollution.

== See also ==
- Netravati River
- Mangalore
- Sharavati River
- Linganamakki Dam
