= Hornadu =

Horanadu
- Village
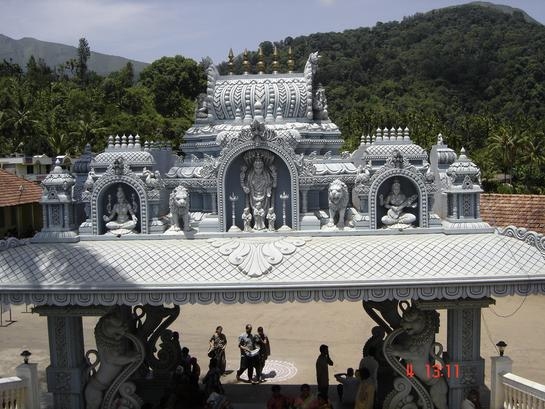
- Mahadwara (main gate) of Annapoorneshwari Temple in Hornadu

- Location in Karnataka, India
- Coordinates: 13.2705°N 75.3414°E
- Country: India
- State: Karnataka
- District: Chikkamagaluru

Government
  - Body: Gram Panchayat
- Elevation: 831 m (2,726 ft)

Languages
  - Official: Kannada
- Time zone: UTC+5:30 (IST)
- PIN: 577 181
- Telephone code: 08269
- ISO 3166 code: IN-KA
- Vehicle registration: KA-18
- Website: karnataka.gov.in

Horanadu, also known as Sri Kshetra Horanadu, is a Panchayat village in Kalasa taluk of Chikkamagaluru district, Karnataka, India. It is the site of the Annapoorneshwari Temple. Horanadu has an elevation of 831 m (2,726 ft).
