= Gajanur, Shimoga =

- village
- Location in Karnataka, India Gajanur, Shimoga (India)
- Coordinates: 13.839°N 75.527°E
- Country: India
- State: Karnataka
- District: Shivamogga

Languages
  - Official: Kannada
- Time zone: UTC+5:30 (IST)
- PIN: 577 220
- Telephone code: 08182
- Vehicle registration: KA-14

Gajanur is a village 12 km from Shimoga in the Shimoga district of Karnataka, India. The Tunga river flows through the village. Gajanur is well known for the dam built across the river. 1 km from Gajanur there is place called "Sakkarebaylu" which is an elephant training camp run by the government of India. located on the banks of the Tunga river. It is 15 km from "Mandagadde" bird life sanctuary. There is a JNV, Gajanur (JVNG) boarding school near Gajanur. JNVG is funded by the Indian Ministry of Human Resources Development

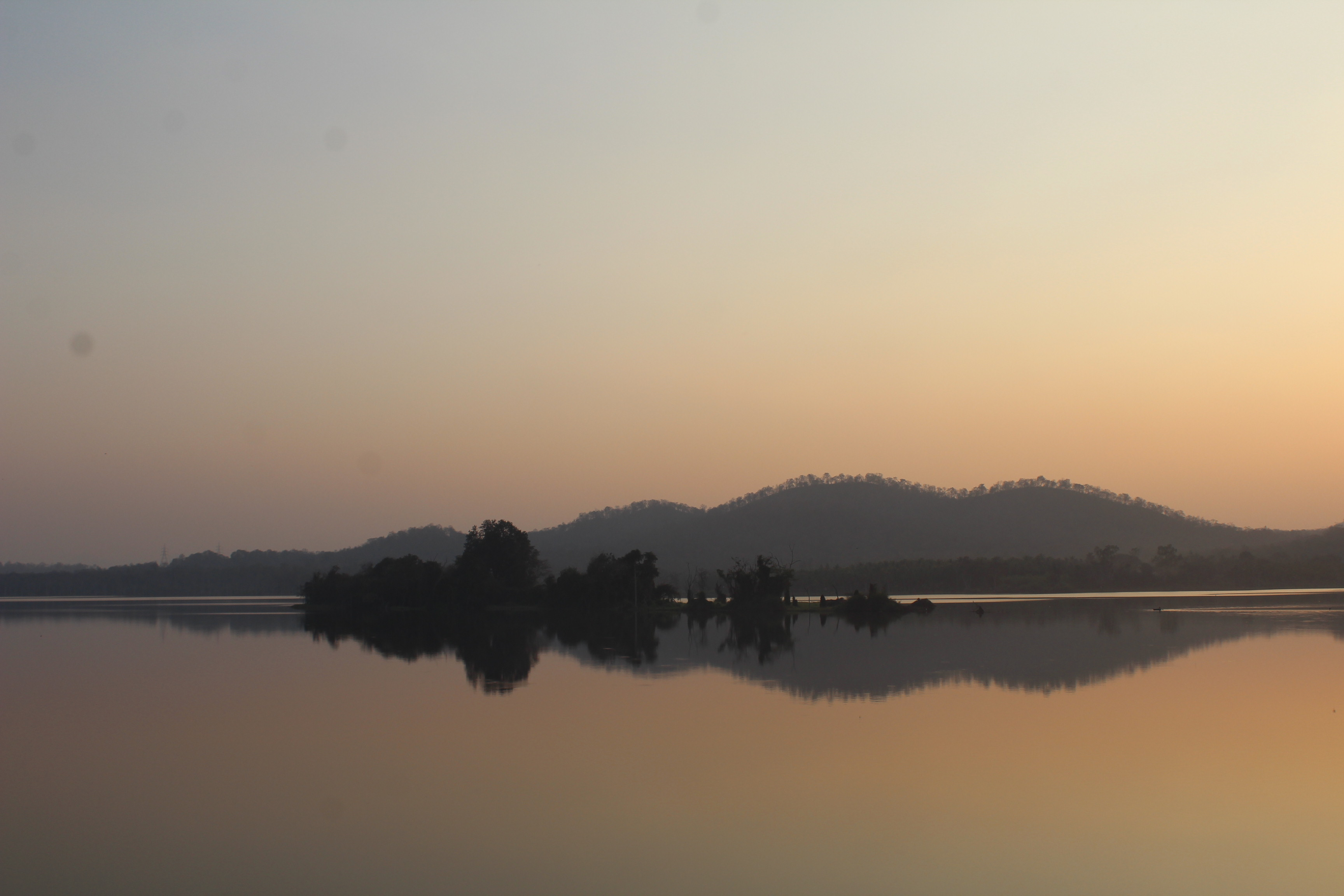
A view near the dam, across Tunga river

== Gajanur Dam ==
It is built across Tunga River, to serve drinking and irrigation purpose of Shivamogga city and other taluks of the district. The length of dam is 532.35 metres, and full reservoir level of 583.04 metres. Its gross storage capacity is only 3.24 TMC ft., even though it was planned for 12 TMC ft.

Water from the dam is pumped to Bhadra Dam during the peak monsoon season, which is then further used to serve dry regions of Chitradurga district.

== See also ==
- Tunga River, a river near Gajanur
- Jawahar Navodaya Vidyalaya, a boarding school near Gajanur
- Gajanur, a place in Tamil Nadu, India
