= Karekatte =

- village
- Location in Karnataka, India
- Coordinates: 14°12′7″N 75°53′44″E
- Country: Nallur India
- State: Karnataka
- District: Davanagere

Government
  - Body: Gram panchayat

Population (2001)
  - Total: 4,507

Languages
  - Official: Kannada
- Time zone: UTC+5:30 (IST)
- PIN: 577 544
- Telephone code: 91 8180
- Vehicle registration: KA-17
- Nearest city: Nallur
- Sex ratio: 925/1000 ♂/♀
- Literacy: 58.3%
- Lok Sabha constituency: Davanagere
- Civic agency: Gram panchayat

Karekatte is a village in the Indian state of Karnataka. Karekatte is located on Davanagere-Nallur Sub division Channagiri connecting road. At a distance of about 34 km (21 mi) from the Davanagere (District). At a distance of about 28.6 km (18 mi) from the Channagiri (Taluk).

== History ==
New Karekatte, a shifted village, and very well planned village, Whole village got shifted in 1974. Karekatte is one of the 61 Gram Panchayats of Channagiri Taluk and belongs to Santhebennur-2 hobli.

== Demographics ==
As of 2001 India census.

Number of Households	Total	796
Total Population	Total	4,507
Total Population	Males	2,341
Total Population	Females	2,166
Sex ratio	per 1000 males	925 females
Population in age group 0–6 years	Total	677
Population in age group 0–6 years	Males	346
Population in age group 0–6 years	Females	331
Child Sex ratio (0-6 age group)	per 1000 males	957 females
Literacy	Total	58.3%
Literacy	Males	66.8%
Literacy	Females	49.0%

== Education and business ==
Karekatte have following schools, up to 10th standard only.

Primary with Upper Primary Schools and High Schools:

Sl.No	School name	Management type	School Category
1	Govt Higher Primary School (GHPS)- Karekatte Thanda	Department of Education	Primary with Upper Primary
2	Kannada Higher Primary School (KHPS) - Karekatte	Department of Education	Primary with Upper Primary
3	Jnyanadarshini Higher Primary School (JHPS) - Karekatte	Pvt. Unaided	Primary with Upper Primary
4	Urdu Higher Primary School (UHPS) - Karekatte	Department of Education	Primary with Upper Primary
5	Govt High School (GHS)- Karekatte	Department of Education	Secondary Only (8-10)
6	Govt Urdu High School (GUHS) - Karekatte	Department of Education	Secondary Only (8-10)

Anganwadi Centres (Kindergarten)).: They were started by the Indian government as part of the Integrated Child Development Services program to combat child hunger and malnutrition.

Sl No.	Name of Anganawadi Centre	Year of Operation
1	Karekatte-1	09-09-1980
2	Karekatte-2	09-01-1985
3	Karekatte-3	09-01-1985
4	Karekatte-4	06-01-2006
5	Karekatte-5	06-01-2006

Karekatte has one "Pre-Metric Government Hostel" for boys; it specially serves for poor family children.

Fair Price Shop (Nyaya Bele Angadi): part of India's Public Distribution System established by Government of India, is a kind of shop in India which is used to distribute rations at a subsidized price to the poor. Locally these are known as "Nyaya Bele Angadi" and chiefly sell wheat, rice, kerosene and sugar at a price lower than the market price. For buying items from this shop one must have a ration card. These shops are operated throughout the country by joint assistance of central and state government.

Ration Card details of Karekatte Panchayat:

Village	Total Ration cards
Karekatte	1192
Hallimallapura	204
Total	1396

Here main occupation is agriculture. Most of the land is irrigated by Bhadhra Right Bank Canal, from Bhadhra Reservoir Project (BRP), near Lakkavalli, Tarikere (Taluk), Chikkamagaluru (District) Mainly Paddy, Sugarcane, Betel nut, Coconut.

Other major business is Milk Production. Karekatte has Milk Producers Co-operative Societies (KMPCS).

COMMUNITY HALL (Dr. B. R. Ambedkar SAMUDAYA BHAVAN is constructed at Harijan Colony at a cost of Rs.2.00 lakh. It is constructed Under Special Component Plan for all-round development of Scheduled Castes / Scheduled Tribes.

Postal Branch Office Details:

Office Name	Karekatte B.O
Pincod	577544
Status	Branch Office(Delivery)
SubOffice	Thyavanige S.O
HeadOffice	Bhadravati H.O
Location	Channagiri Taluk of Davangere District
Telephone	Not Available
SPCC	Shimoga-577201
Postal Department Information	Shimoga Division South Karnataka Region Karnataka Circle

Karekatte has Fully Covered Water Supply' to every household, Developed under the Accelerated Rural Water Supply Programme (ARWSP) was introduced by the Government of India to accelerate the pace of coverage of drinking water supply.

Karekatte don't have any Bank branches, Nearest Banks are:

Sl No.	Bank Name	Place	Distance from Karekatte	Tel No.	IFSC code
1	Corporation Bank	Thyavanige	7.5 km	08180-276733	CORP0000103
2	State Bank of India	Kerebilichi	7.0 km	08180-257531	SBIN0040340

== Places of interest ==
- Mallikarjuna Temple (also known as Mallapana Matti), which is situated on a Hill,
- Shanti Sagara (Soolekere)Lake, one of Asia's biggest tanks, built in 1128, the tank has a history of 800 years. It took three years to construct the massive tank. The tank, which has a water spread of 2,651 hectares, has a radius of 65 km (40 mi). It has a total catchment area of 329.75 square kilometres. It irrigates 1,900 hectares of land and more than 50 villages are benefited by it. Only 6 km (4 mi) from Karekatte. There is a temple dedicated to Lord Siddeshwara near the lake. An aqueduct designed by Sir M Vishweshwariah is also a major tourist attraction. The government is taking steps to spruce up tourist attractions in the area.

== Transportation ==
=== Road ===
Karekatte is ~1 km away from main Nallur Channagiri - Davanagere connecting road. Only one Bus will pass through Karekatte village in the morning and evening once. There is a frequent bus from Channagiri Nallur to davanagere vice versa. So need to get down at Kabbala village, from there common passenger auto-rickshaws are available to karekatte.

From Karekatte	Distance in km
Nallur	24
Davanagere	34.0
Channagiri	28
Shimoga	70
Bangalore	290

=== Rail ===
Nearest Railway station is Davanagere at 34 km from Karekatte.

Station Name : DAVANGERE

Station Code : DVG

State Highway: 65

Elevation : 598 m above sea level

Railway Zone : South Western Railway zone.

=== Air ===
Nearest Airport is under construction at Sogane, 6 km from Shimoga at a distance of 75 km from karekatte.

Operating Nearest Airport is Hubli Airport, 184 km from karekatte.

Hubli Airport codes: IATA: HBX, ICAO: VAHB

== Civic administration ==
Karekatte Gram panchayat are local governments at the village. Members of the Gram Panchayat or Gram Nyayalaya are elected directly by the village people on the basis of adult franchise by the Gram sabha which comprises the adult mass of the village, for a term of five years. A candidate contesting in this election must be 21 years old. The number of members elected is 14. Some of the seats are reserved for Scheduled Castes, Scheduled Tribes and women. A person is eligible for election if she/he does not have more than 2 children.

Gram panchyat has 5 wards, 14 elected members (including President and Vice President) and includes Hallimallapura (village attached to Karekatte).

Gram panchyat Office bearers: Panchayat Development Officer(PDO), Secretary, Data Entry Operator, Pump Operators and Peon.

The Gram panchayat has the responsibilities of

1. Looking after street lights, construction and repair work of the roads in the villages and also the village markets, fairs, festivals and celebrations.

2. Keeping a record of births, deaths and marriages in the village.

3. Looking after public health and hygiene by providing facilities for sanitation and drinking water.

4. Providing for education.

5. Implementing development schemes for agriculture and animal husbandry.

Karekatte belongs to Channagiri Assembly Constituency, State Code: S10, Assembly Constituency Code: 109, This constituency is famous for humorous and witty thinker, the former chief minister of Karnataka late J. H. Patel.

Polling Booth (No.)	Males	Females	Total Electors of Booth	Total Electors of Village	Voting Power
HPS School East (20)	369	279	648		
HPS School West (21)	515	443	958		
GUH School Centre(22)	838	685	1523		
Total	1722	1407	3129	3129	2.01%

State Elections 1999 become famous as Chief Minister J. H. Patel, lost to Vadnal Rajanna, a Bharatiya Janata Party (BJP) rebel candidate, by a margin of almost 26514 votes.

== Languages spoken ==
Kannada, Urdu, Lambani are the major languages spoken in Karekatte.

== Climate ==
Karekatte receives normal annual rainfall 644 mm mainly through southwest monsoon (June–September- 341 mm) and north-East monsoon (October–December 303mm). The relative humidity is high is monsoon reason 70 to 80 but is not summer comes down to 25% to 35% temperature varies over a wide range from 18 °C to 38 °C.

== Events ==
Basaveshwara Jatre (fair) that is conducted yearly in the month of March/April. and Mari Habba is conducted once in a 4 years.
