= List of waterfalls in Karnataka =

This is a list of waterfalls in the Indian state of Karnataka.

Name	District	Height	Details
Jhari Falls	Chikmagalur	165–230 ft (50–70 m)	22 km (14 mi) from Chikmagalur
Gaganachukki and Bharachukki Falls	Mandya and Chamarajanagar	-	River Kaveri, 100 km (62 mi) from Bengaluru
Apsarakonda Falls	Uttara Kannada	-	River Sharavati, 8 km (5.0 mi) from Honnavar
Lalguli Falls	Uttara Kannada	250 ft (76 m)	River Kali, 13 km (8.1 mi) from Yellapur
Burude Falls or Dodmane Falls	Uttara Kannada		20 km (12 mi)+ from Siddapura and 55 km (34 mi)+ from Sirsi on Siddapur-Kumta road
Shivagange Falls	Uttara Kannada	243 ft (74 m)	River Sonda, 45 km (28 mi) from Sirsi
Belkal theertha	Shimoga & Udupi	600 ft (180 m)	During rainy season, 110 km (68 mi) from Shimoga
Dabbe Falls	Shimoga		near Hosagadde, 20 km (12 mi) from Kargal
Waate haLLa Falls	Uttara Kannada	100 ft (30 m)+	30 km (19 mi) from Sirsi
Vibhooti Falls	Uttara Kannada		50 km (31 mi) from Sirsi on Yana-Ankola Road
Alekan Falls	Dakshina Kannada		18 km (11 mi) from Charmadi
Dondole Falls	Dakshina Kannada	50 ft (15 m)+	23 km (14 mi) from Charmadi
Shanti Falls	Chikmagalur	12 ft (3.7 m)	near Kemmanagundi
Abbey Falls	Kodagu		8 km (5.0 mi) from Madikeri
Arisina Gundi Falls	Udupi		near Kollur
Barkana Falls	Shimoga	850 ft (260 m)	River Sita, near Agumbe
Bennehole Falls	Uttara Kannada	230 ft (70 m)	On the way to Kumta from Sirsi
Chunchanakatte Falls	Mysore	66 ft (20 m)	River Cauvery, 15 km (9.3 mi) from Krishnarajanagara
Godchinamalaki Falls	Belgaum	141 ft (43 m)	River Markandeya, 16 km (9.9 mi) from Gokak
Gokak Falls	Belgaum	170 ft (52 m)	River Ghataprabha, 6 km (3.7 mi) from Gokak
Hebbe Falls	Chikmagalur	551 ft (168 m)	10 km (6.2 mi) from Kemmanagundi
Irupu Falls	Kodagu	170 ft (52 m)	River Lakshmana Tirtha 48 km (30 mi) from Virajpet
Jomlu Theertha Falls	Udupi	30 ft (9.1 m)	Seethanadi, 35 km (22 mi) from Udupi
Chelavara Falls	Kodagu		10 km (6.2 mi) from Palace Estate
Mallalli Falls	Kodagu		River Kumaradhara, 25 km (16 mi) from Somwarpet
Jog Falls or Gersoppa Falls	Shimoga & Uttara Kannada	829 ft (253 m)	River Sharavathi, 30 km (19 mi) from Sagara
Bangara kusuma Falls	Uttara Kannada		5–6 km (3.1–3.7 mi) north of Gerusoppa.
Hidlumane Falls	Shimoga	100 ft (30 m)	Kodachadri water stream, 105 km (65 mi) from Shimoga
Kalhatti Falls	Chikmagalur	403 ft (123 m)	near Kemmanagundi
Unchalli Falls or Keppa Falls	Uttara Kannada	380 ft (120 m)	35 km (22 mi) from Siddapura 45 km (28 mi) from Sirsi
Koosalli Water Falls	Udupi	380 ft (120 m)	70 km (43 mi) from Udupi
Kudumari Falls or Belligundi Falls	Udupi	300 ft (91 m)	
Magod Falls	Uttara Kannada	650 ft (200 m)	River Bedti, 17 km (11 mi) from Yellapur
Manikyadhara Falls	Chikmagalur		1 km (0.62 mi) from Baba Budangiri
Muthyala Maduvu Waterfall	Bangalore		40 km (25 mi) from Bengaluru, very small waterfall
Shivanasamudra Falls	Chamarajanagar	320 ft (98 m)	River Cauvery, 139 km (86 mi) from Bangalore
Sathodi Falls	Uttara Kannada	49 ft (15 m)	River Kali, 32 km (20 mi) from Yellapur
Vajrapoha Falls	Belgaum	197 ft (60 m)	River Mandovi, 35 km (22 mi) from Belgaum[Chapoli]
Sirimane Falls	Chikmagalur		22 km (14 mi) from Sringeri
Sogal Falls	Belgaum		near Bailhongal
Chunchi Falls	Bengaluru		River Arkavathi, 90 km (56 mi) from Bengaluru
Suthanabbe Falls or Hanumanagundi Falls	Chikmagalur	100 ft (30 m)+	near Kudremukh
Chikale Falls	Belgaum		River Rain water, 38 km (24 mi) from Belgaum
Vajrapoha Falls	Belgaum	200ft chapoli	River Mandovi, 15 km (9.3 mi) from Khanapur
Shimbola Falls	Belgaum		River N/A, 46 km (29 mi) from Belgaum
Jalavne Falls	Belgaum-Goa		River N/A, 60 km (37 mi) from Belgaum
Betne Falls	Belgaum		River N/A, 36 km (22 mi) from Belgaum
Kunchikal Falls	Shimoga	600 ft (180 m)	River Varahi, near Mastikatte in Shimoga district. This is the highest tiered waterfalls in India and second highest in Asia.

== See also ==
- List of waterfalls
