= Lingadahalli =

- Village
- Location in Karnataka, India Lingadahalli (India)
- Coordinates: 13.596068°N 75.844396°E
- Country: India
- State: Karnataka
- District: Chikmagalur
- Taluk: Tarikere
- Region: Malenadu

Government
  - Type: Panchayat raj
  - Body: Gram panchayat

Area (Village + kaval)
  - Total: 15.5 km^{2} (6.0 sq mi)
- Elevation: 830 m (2,720 ft)

Population
  - Total: 6,042
  - Density: 390/km^{2} (1,010/sq mi)

Languages
  - Official: Kannada
- Time zone: UTC+5:30 (IST)
- PIN: 577129
- Telephone code: 08261
- ISO 3166 code: IN-KA
- Vehicle registration: KA-66
- Nearest city: Chikmagalur, Shimoga
- Literacy: 81 %
- Lok Sabha constituency: Udupi Chikmagalur Lok Sabha constituency
- Climate: Cool (Köppen)
- Website: karnataka.gov.in

Lingadahalli is a village and a hobli in Tarikere Taluk, Chikmagalur district, Karnataka, India. Lingadahalli is one of the prominent pre-historic sites in Karnataka state. The location code number of Lingadahalli as per census of India 2011 are, 609336 and 609334 (kaval).

Lingadahalli is located on State Highway 57 (Karnataka), 45 km north of Chikmagalur and 15 km south of Tarikere.

Baba Budangiri mountain range lie to the south and Bhadra Wildlife Sanctuary lies to the west of Lingadalli.

== Demographics ==
Lingayatism is the major religion in the area. There are many different religions practiced in this village, so the village is known for religious tolerance and understanding.

The name Lingadahalli comes from the Lingayat community, the largest part of the population of the community. The VeeraShiva legend is a part of this area's culture, although Brahmins and the Koushika Sankethi group comprise a large part of the community. Sankethi is the major tribe among Brahmins.

Virabadreshvara Temple and Ramamandira temple of lord Rama are at the heart of the town.

The village is a hobli and scenic hills of Kemmanagundi and Kalhathigiri Falls (where the Lord VeeraBhadreshvara resides) are around 10 km from the village. Lingadahalli is a roadmap to Karnataka tourism, nearby places are Sanna Hebbe falls and Dodda Hebbe falls, Shanthi falls, mruthapura temple, Lakkavalli Bhadra Dam, Sri Dattatreya peeta (Baba budan giri), Mullayyanagiri and Bhadra reserve forest. The whole area covered by many hills and coffee estates. Linagadahalli also famous for people like, Late Sri Veda Brahma Narasimha Murthy a pandith in vedas, winner of the Veda Ratna award and also Lingadahalli Subrahmanya Shashidhara, an Indian developmental biologist who has also received Shanti Swarup Bhatnagar Prize. Agriculture is the main industry in this area and common perennial crops grown are areca nut, coconut and banana. The main annual crops grown are beans, green peas, potatoes, and chili peppers.

== See also ==
- Basava
- Vachanas
- Veeragase
- Sankethi language
