= Tarikere =

- Town
- Location in Karnataka, India
- Coordinates: 13.710444°N 75.812178°E
- Country: India
- State: Karnataka
- District: Chikmagalur
- Region: Malenadu

Government
  - Body: Town Municipal Council

Area
  - Urban: 15 km^{2} (5.8 sq mi)
  - Rural: 1,207.34 km^{2} (466.16 sq mi)
- Elevation: 697 m (2,287 ft)

Population (2011)
  - Rank: 2nd in Chikmagalur
  - Urban: 35,942
  - Rural: 189,338

Languages
  - Official: Kannada
- Time zone: UTC+5:30 (IST)
- PIN: 577228
- Telephone code: 08261
- Vehicle registration: KA-66
- Website: http://www.tarikeretown.mrc.gov.in

Tarikere is a town, a taluk and is one of the two Subdivisional headquarter in the Chikmagalur district of Karnataka state, India. It is popularly known as gateway of Malnad because the Malnad area starts from here. The town's name is derived from the number of lakes which surround it (kere is the word for a lake).

== History ==
The Tarikere garrison was established in 1545 AD by Hanumappa Nayaka, a general of the Vijayanagara army. Before that, he is said to have ruled from 'Basavapatna' near Channagiri . During the reign of Kengappa Nayaka, the capital was shifted to Tarikere. Hanumappa and his successors ruled from Tarikere and enjoyed power over lands that brought in an annual revenue of nine lakhs of gold coins. They were quite powerful for more than a century. After the beginning of the seventeenth century, their power waned. They had to succumb to the forces of the Marathas and Hyder Ali. Sarja Rangappa Nayaka, Sarja Hanumappa Nayaka and Krishnappa Nayaka were other important rulers belonging to this kingdom. Sarja Rangappa Nayaka participated in the Third and Fourth Mysore Wars. After the death of Tipu Sultan, they revolted against the misrule of the British rulers. This revolt is known as the 'Budi Basavappa's Revolt'. By the beginning of the nineteenth century, this polity had become extinct.

== Getting there ==
=== Road ===
NH-69 (Previously known as NH-206 or BH Road) (Bangalore to Honnavar) pass through Tarikere.

From Mysore it can be reached via Mysuru-Arsikere state highway and then by NH-69.

From the district headquarters of Chikmagalur, Tarikere can be reached in 2 different ways. It can be reached via Lingadahalli on SH-57 (through mountainous forest & Coffee estates) (57 kilometres (35 mi)), or via Kadur and Birur on NH-173 (75 kilometres (47 mi)).

=== Rail ===
Tarikere railway station lies on the Birur to Talguppa railway line. There are trains from Chikmagalur, Mysore and Bangalore which stop at Tarikere (Station Code: TKE) on the way to Shimoga.

=== Air ===
Shivamogga (RQY) is the nearest airport and one daily flight operates between Bangalore- Shivamogga operated bt INDIGO. Airport is approximately 31 kms and take about 45 minutes by road to reach Tarikere.

== Geography ==
Tarikere is located at 13.72°N 75.82°E. It has an average elevation of 698 metres (2290 feet).

Tarikere borders three taluks in its own district. There is Channagiri taluk to the north, Narasimharajapura to the west, Chikmagalur to the south-west, and Kadur to the south. Shimoga and Bhadravathi border Tarikere to the North and are in the Shimoga District. The following are the hobli headquarters which include both Malnad and Maidan hoblis within Tarikere taluk:

1. Amruthapura
2. Lakkavalli
3. Lingadahalli
4. Kasaba

== Demographics ==
As of 2001 India census, Tarikere had a population of about 35,000. Males constitute 51% of the population and females constitute 49%. Tarikere has an average literacy rate of 68%, 8.5% higher than the national average of 59.5%: male literacy levels are at 73%, and female literacy levels are at 62%. In Tarikere, 11% of the population is under 6 years of age.

== Economy ==
Agriculture is the primary occupation in Tarikere. Betel nuts, Paddy, Ragi, Areca nuts, Coffee, Coconuts, Bananas, Pan leaves, Mangoes, and Corn are the major types of crops grown in this region. The region used to be a major rice-producing area though now predominantly grows areca nut.

== Nearby places ==
Tarikere is surrounded by many tanks and ponds. The tanks near Tarikere include Chikkere, Doddakere, Dalavikere, Ramanayakanakere, and Kendarahalla. There are also several historical places surrounding Tarikere.

- Bhadra Wildlife Sanctuary is a wildlife sanctuary as well as a tiger protection area.
- Kemmangundi is a popular hill station in Tarikere.
- Amritheshwara temple constructed by the Hoysalas.
- The Kallathigiri falls are a popular series of miniature waterfalls which run under the Lord Veera Bhadra temple.
- Bhadra Dam one of the oldest and biggest dam of Karnataka surrounded by hills of the western ghats
- Sri Subrahmanya Swamy temple is also a Hindu temple located in the heart of the town.
- Sri Banashankari devi temple is also a Hindu temple in the town.

== Other information ==
Tarikere is immortalised in the popular Kannada tongue-twister folksong "Tarikere Kere Eri Mele Mooru Kari Kuri Mari Meythittu". This was also the title for a song in the film Devara Duddu and was sung by the famous singer, S P Balasubramanyam.

== See also ==
- A. Rangapura
