= Avathi, Chikmagalur =

Avathi
- Village
- Avathi
- Location in Karnataka, India
- Coordinates: 13.341611°N 75.636346°E
- Country: India
- State: Karnataka
- District: Chikmagalur
- Taluk: Chikmagalur

Government
  - Body: Grama Panchayath

Area
  - Total: 10.68 km^{2} (4.12 sq mi)
- Elevation: 1,180 m (3,870 ft)

Population (2011)
  - Total: 1,644
  - Density: 153.9/km^{2} (398.7/sq mi)

Languages
  - Official: Kannada
- Time zone: UTC+5:30 (IST)
- PIN: 577101
- Telephone code: 08262
- Vehicle registration: KA-18

Avathi is a village in Chikkamagaluru taluk in the Chikkamagaluru district of Karnataka, India.

The village (Location code number 609712) had a population of 1644 as of 2011 census data. Of this 810 were males and 834 were females. It is situated 22 km west of its district headquarters, Chikmagaluru. The nearest hobli is Mallandur.
