= Attigundi =

- village
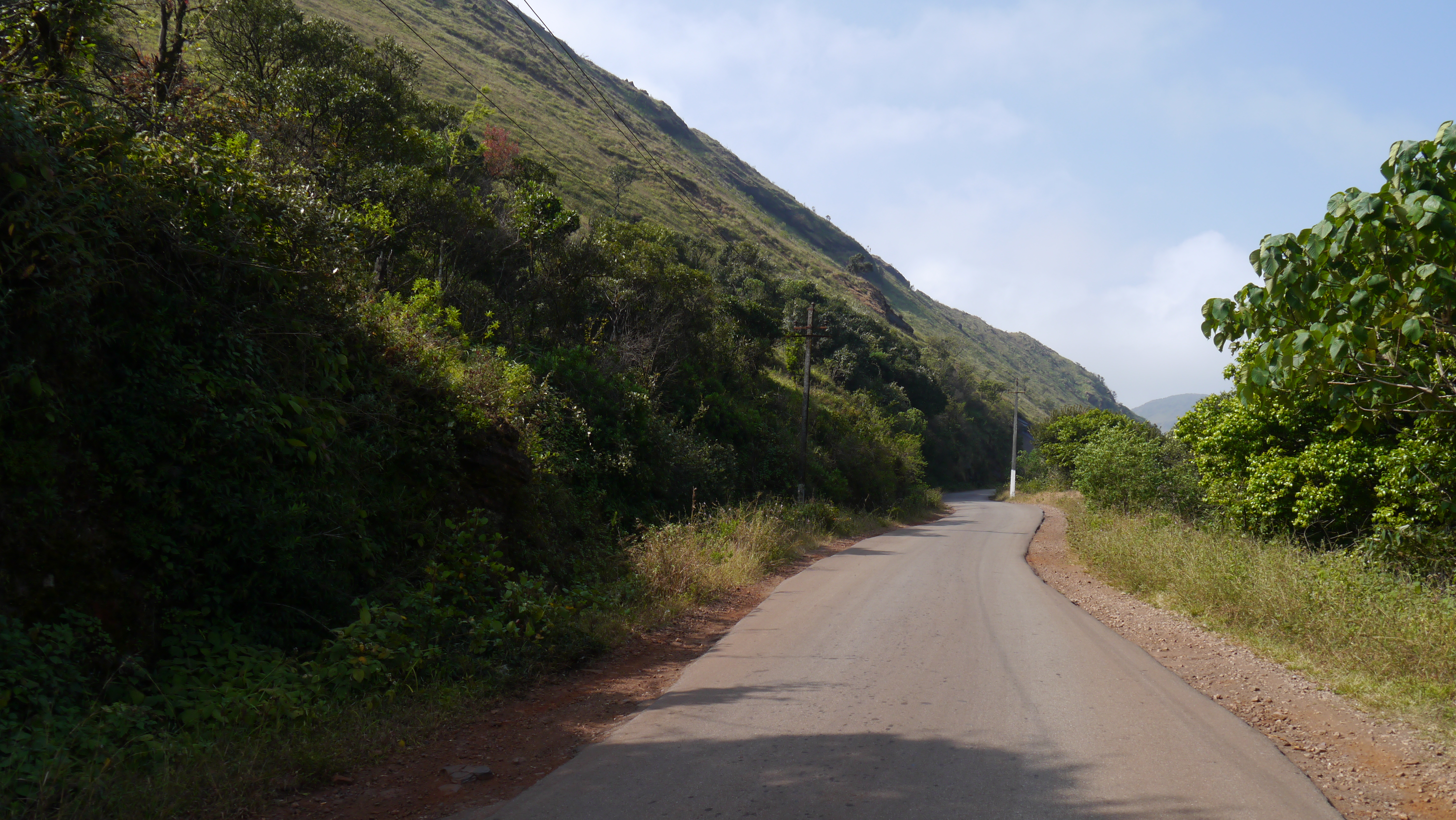

- Location in Karnataka, India Attigundi (India)
- Coordinates: 13.4333°N 75.7500°E
- Country: India
- State: Karnataka
- District: Chikmagalur
- Elevation: 1,407 m (4,616 ft)

Languages
  - Official: Kannada
- Time zone: UTC+5:30 (IST)

Attigundi is a village in the Chikkamagalur district of Karnataka. It is governed locally by gram panchayat. It is located near the Muthodi wildlife sanctuary and the tourist destinations of Honnammana Halla waterfalls, Jhari Falls, Kavikal Gandi, Galikere, Bababudangiri and Kemmangundi. The average temperature is 20 degrees Celsius.

Manikyadhara falls on Baba Budangiri near Attigundi

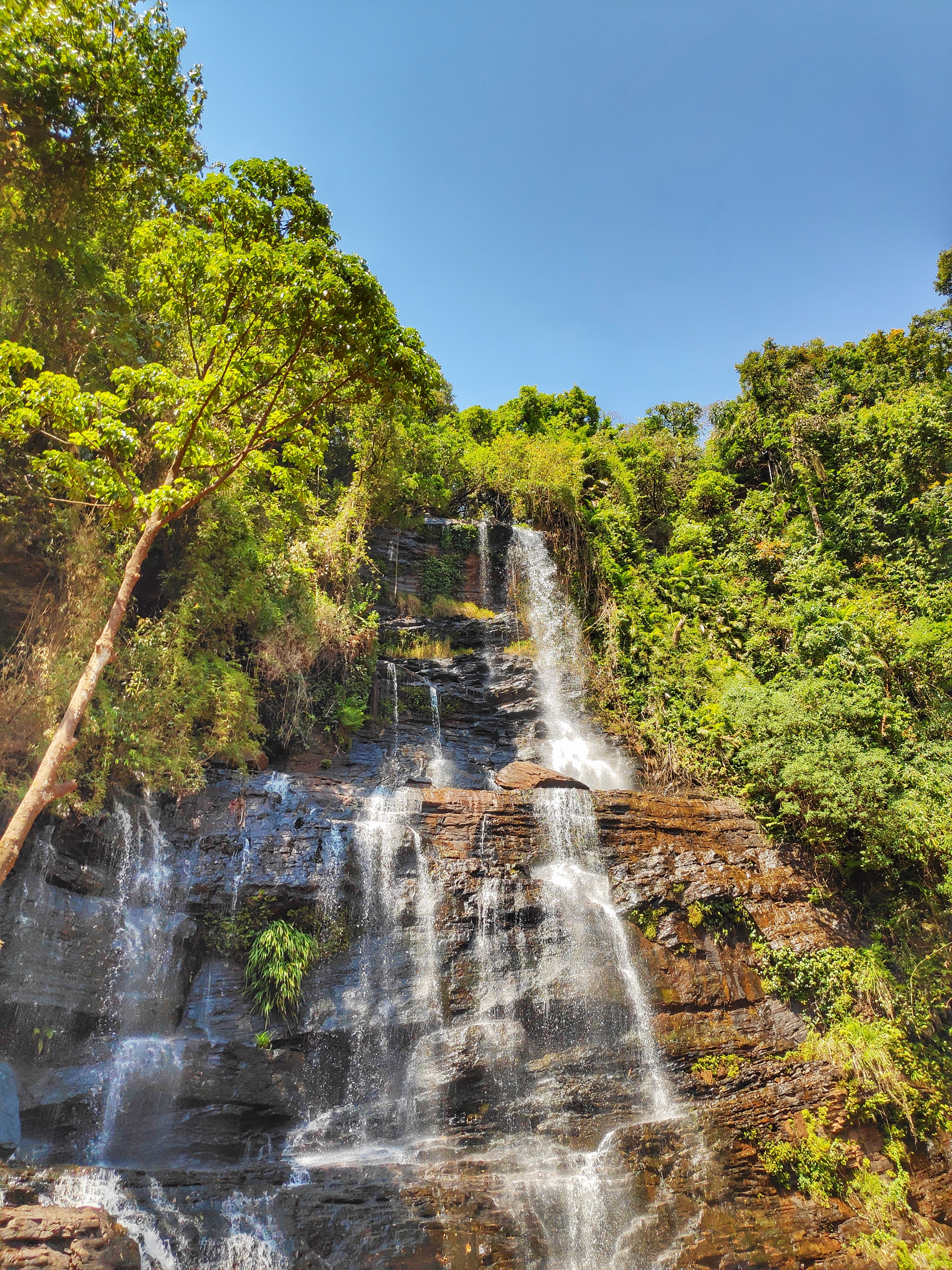
Jhari falls

Climate data for Attigundi
Month	Jan	Feb	Mar	Apr	May	Jun	Jul	Aug	Sep	Oct	Nov	Dec	Year
Mean daily maximum °C (°F)	26.5 (79.7)	28.2 (82.8)	30.3 (86.5)	30.3 (86.5)	28.0 (82.4)	23.6 (74.5)	22.2 (72.0)	22.6 (72.7)	24.0 (75.2)	24.6 (76.3)	24.5 (76.1)	25.2 (77.4)	25.8 (78.5)
Mean daily minimum °C (°F)	14.1 (57.4)	15.3 (59.5)	17.4 (63.3)	19.3 (66.7)	19.5 (67.1)	18.9 (66.0)	18.3 (64.9)	18.1 (64.6)	17.9 (64.2)	17.4 (63.3)	15.9 (60.6)	14.5 (58.1)	17.2 (63.0)
Average rainfall mm (inches)	5 (0.2)	8 (0.3)	18 (0.7)	56 (2.2)	112 (4.4)	217 (8.5)	264 (10.4)	201 (7.9)	143 (5.6)	175 (6.9)	65 (2.6)	15 (0.6)	1,279 (50.3)
Source: https://en.climate-data.org/asia/india/karnataka/attigundi-757050/
