= Sakrepatna =

Sakarayapattana
- village
- Location in Karnataka, India Sakarayapattana (India)
- Coordinates: 13.56°N 76.01°E
- Country: India
- State: Karnataka
- District: Chikkamagaluru
- Taluka: Kadur

Population (2001)
  - Total: 5,550

Languages
  - Official: Kannada
- Time zone: UTC+5:30 (IST)

Sakharāyapattana is a village in the southern state of Karnataka, India. It is located in the Kadur taluk of Chikkamagaluru district in Karnataka.

== Demographics ==
As of 2001 India census, Sakrepatna had a population of 5550 with 2808 males and 2742 females.

== See also ==
- Chikmagalur
- Districts of Karnataka
