= Yagati =

- Village
- Location in Karnataka, India
- Coordinates: 13°37′N 76°08′E
- Country: India
- State: Karnataka
- District: Chikmagalur
- Talukas: Kadur

Government
  - Body: Grama Panchayath

Area
  - Total: 9.12 km^{2} (3.52 sq mi)
- Elevation: 743 m (2,438 ft)

Population (2011)
  - Total: 2,674
  - Density: 293/km^{2} (759/sq mi)

Languages
  - Official: Kannada
- Time zone: UTC+5:30 (IST)
- PIN: 577140
- Vehicle registration: KA-66, KA-18

Yagati is a hobli in the southern state of Karnataka, India. It is located in the Kadur taluk of Chikmagalur district. It is located 60 km east of the district headquarters Chikmagalur, 12 km from Kadurhalli, and 201 km from the state capital Bangalore.

== Demographics ==
At the 2011 India census, Yagati had a population of 2,674 (1,342 males, 1,332 females).

== Economy ==
Farming is the main occupation with farmers mainly growing tender coconut and banana trees. Due to water scarcity and draughts there has been a decline in farming.

== Notable places ==
Yagati houses many sacred temples, Sri Mallikarjuna Temple of Lord Shiva is considered the native God. The yearly festive of Goddess Arekallamma is celebrated throughout the village. A rare monolithic stone of Lord Hanuman is worshipped in the Anjaneya temple.

== Notable people ==
- Y. S. V. Datta, born in Yagati.
