= Malalur =

- Village
- Location in Karnataka
- Country: India
- State: Karnataka
- District: Chikkamagaluru
- Taluk: Chikkamagaluru

Government
  - Body: Village Panchayat

Languages
  - Official: Kannada
- Time zone: UTC+5:30 (IST)
- Nearest city: Chikkamagaluru
- Civic agency: Village Panchayat

Malalur is a village in Thithahalli taluk of Shivamogga district, in the southern state of Karnataka, India.

In September 2026, farmers took out a protest demanding the implementation of the multipurpose Malalur Lift Irrigation Scheme.
