= Kemmangundi =

Kemmannundi Kemmannugundi
- village
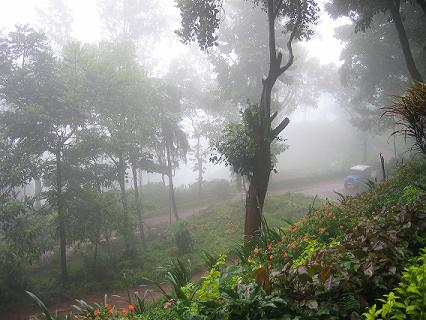
- Foggy day at Kemmangundi

- Location in Karnataka, India
- Coordinates: 13.547°N 75.758°E
- Country: India
- State: Karnataka
- District: Chikkamagaluru
- Elevation: 1,434 m (4,705 ft)

Languages
  - Official: Kannada
- Time zone: UTC+5:30 (IST)
- PIN: 577 129
- Telephone code: 08261
- Vehicle registration: KA-18

Kemmannugundi (Red Soil Pit) is a hill station in Tarikere taluk of Chikkamagaluru district in the state of Karnataka, India. It is at the elevation of 1434m above sea level, with its peak at 1863m. This was the summer retreat of Krishnaraja Wodeyar IV, and as a mark of respect to the king, it is also known as Sri Krishnarajendra Hill Station. The station is ringed by the Baba Budan Giri Range, with cascades, mountain streams, and lush vegetation. Kemmangundi has ornamental gardens and mountains and valleys views.

== History ==
Kemmannugundi (or Kemmannagundi) derives its name from three Kannada words - Kempu (red), mannu (soil) and gundi (pit).

Kemmannugundi was established as the summer retreat of Krishnaraja Wodeyar IV. He later donated this resort to the Government of Karnataka. The Horticultural Department of Karnataka now develops and maintains the resort and its surroundings.

== Landmarks ==
- Z point is a vantage point at Kemmangundi and is reached by a steep uphill trek of about 45 minutes from Raj Bhavan. Shanthi Falls is on the way.

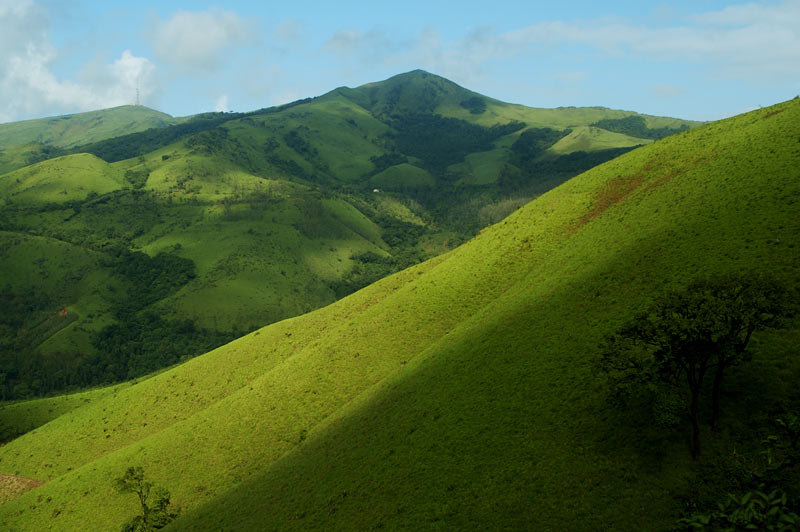
Landscape in Kemmangundi with shola and grassland

- Krishnarajendra botanical park is maintained by the Horticultural Department of Karnataka. Many varieties of roses are cultivated there. Raj Bhavan guesthouse is located within the Krishnarajendra park.
- Hebbe Falls: A downhill trek or SUV ride of about 8 km from Raj Bhavan lies Hebbe Falls where water streams down from a height of 168 meters in two stages to form Dodda Hebbe (Big Falls) and Chikka Hebbe (Small Falls).
- Kallathi falls is about 10 km. from Kemmangundi. Water cascades from a height of 122 metres and the temple here is attributed to times of the Vijayanagar empire. According to a local legend, this place is associated with the Hindu sage, Agastya.
- Mullayanagiri is the tallest peak in Karnataka and is known for the temple perched on the peak.
- Baba Budangiri is second tallest peak in Karnataka. It has a darga and Datta Peetha religious places. Manikyadhara falls and Galikere lake nearby are frequented by tourists.
- Honnammana Halla falls near Attigundi and Hirekolale lake are popular with tourists.

== Climate ==
Kemmanagundi has a Sub-Tropical Highland climate influenced by Monsoon. It has three seasons: Winter (Nov-Feb temp 24-12) followed by Summer (Mar-May 28-16) and Monsoon (June-Oct 22-15) and has a cooler climate throughout the year than most cities in the sub-continent. December is the coldest month with mean temperature of 17, and April is the hottest with a mean of 22.2. Most precipitation falls in July, with an average of 591 mm. February is the driest month.

Climate data for Kemmanagundi
Month	Jan	Feb	Mar	Apr	May	Jun	Jul	Aug	Sep	Oct	Nov	Dec	Year
Mean daily maximum °C (°F)	24.0 (75.2)	26.2 (79.2)	28.1 (82.6)	28.4 (83.1)	27.5 (81.5)	21.4 (70.5)	19.5 (67.1)	21.0 (69.8)	22.3 (72.1)	23.0 (73.4)	23.0 (73.4)	23.2 (73.8)	24.0 (75.1)
Mean daily minimum °C (°F)	11.3 (52.3)	13.2 (55.8)	15.0 (59.0)	16.0 (60.8)	16.5 (61.7)	15.8 (60.4)	15.0 (59.0)	15.6 (60.1)	15.7 (60.3)	14.0 (57.2)	13.7 (56.7)	11.4 (52.5)	14.4 (58.0)
Average rainfall mm (inches)	1.6 (0.06)	0.6 (0.02)	11.0 (0.43)	66.0 (2.60)	137.2 (5.40)	260.1 (10.24)	594.1 (23.39)	441.5 (17.38)	234.0 (9.21)	227.6 (8.96)	69.2 (2.72)	13.5 (0.53)	2,056.4 (80.94)
Source: http://en.climate-data.org/location/796942/

== Transport ==
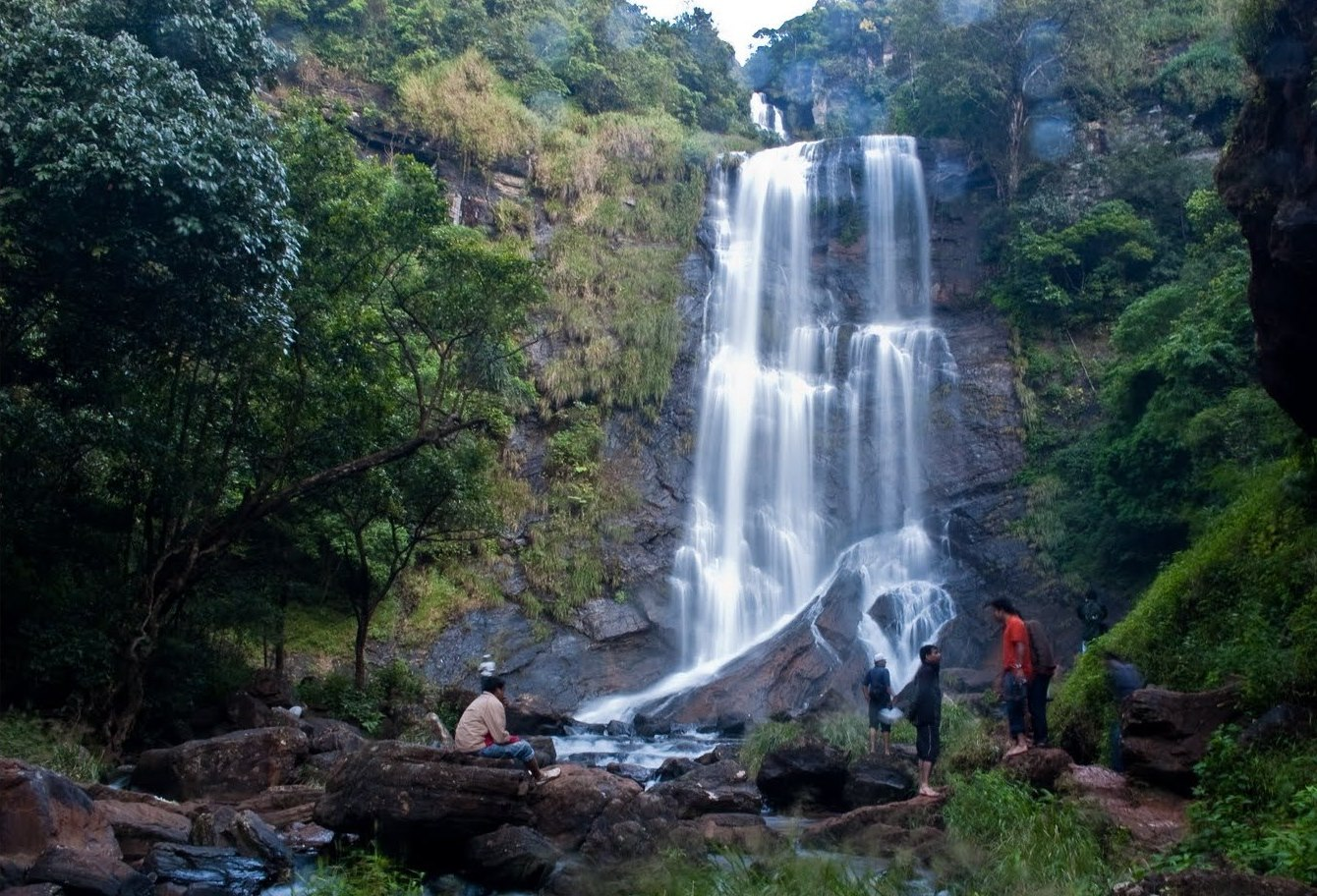
Hebbe Falls

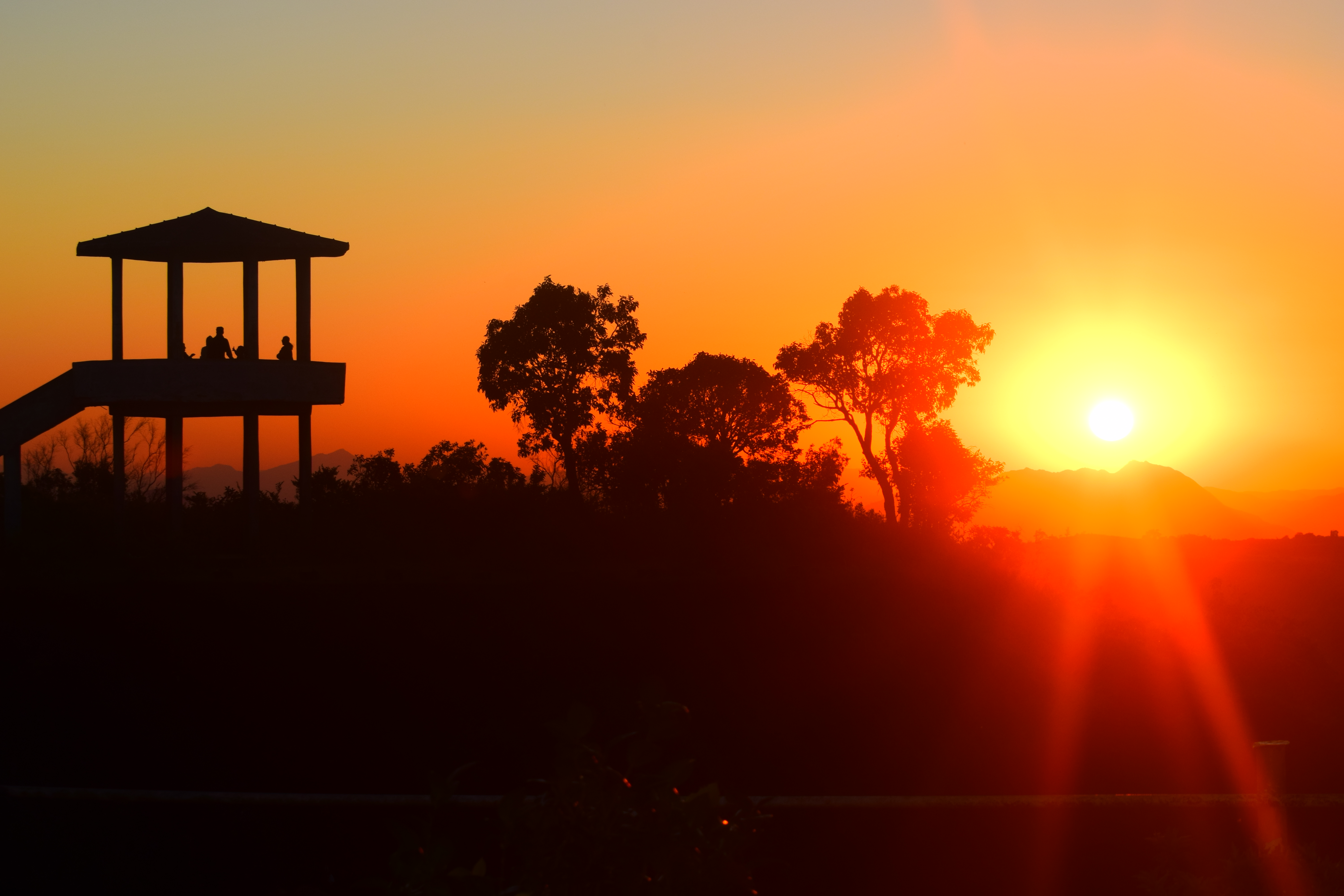
Sunset at viewpoint in Kemmangundi

Road

Kemmannugundi is 53 km from Chikkamagaluru, 17 km from Lingadahalli and 71 km from Shivamogga by road. The nearest National Highways, NH-206 or NH-48, connect to Bangalore. There is another route via Mullayyanagiri and Attigundi, a scenic drive. If you are dependent only on public transport then you can catch a private bus from Lingadahalli at 9.30 a.m. and the same bus (last bus) comes at Kemmanagundi at 4.30 p.m. goes to Birur via Lingadahalli. Kemmannugundi is 212 km from Mangalore, and is accessible via road through National Highways, NH-73 and NH-173.

Rail

The nearest railway station is 33 km away at Tarikere, Birur& Kadur.

Air

The nearest airports are at Mangalore (212 km) and Bangalore (277 km).

== Stay ==
Accommodation in Horticulture Department Guest House (known as Raj Bhavan), which provides a number of rooms, is availed by tourists. Also Kemmanugundi Hill Resort cottages managed by Jungle Lodges and Resorts are availed. There is also a Horticulture Department Guest House in Kallathi village, where the Kallathi waterfalls are located.

== See also ==
- Nandi Hills
- Malnad
- Chamundi Hills
- Kudremukh
- Nilgiris (mountains)
- Himalayas
- Kodaikanal
- Devaramane
