= Adde Vishwanathapura =

- village
- Location in Karnataka, India Adde Vishwanathapura (India)
- Coordinates: 13.187420°N 77.5493200°E
- Country: India
- State: Karnataka
- District: Bengaluru Urban
- Talukas: Bangalore North

Government
  - Body: Village Panchayat

Languages
  - Official: Kannada
- Time zone: UTC+5:30 (IST)
- Nearest city: Bangalore
- Civic agency: Village Panchayat

Adde Vishwanathapura (Addevishvanathapura) is a village in the southern state of Karnataka, India. It is located in the Hesaraghatta-2 hobli, Bangalore North taluk of Bengaluru Urban district in Karnataka.

== See also ==
- Bangalore
- Districts of Karnataka
