= Ayyanakere =

Lake in India

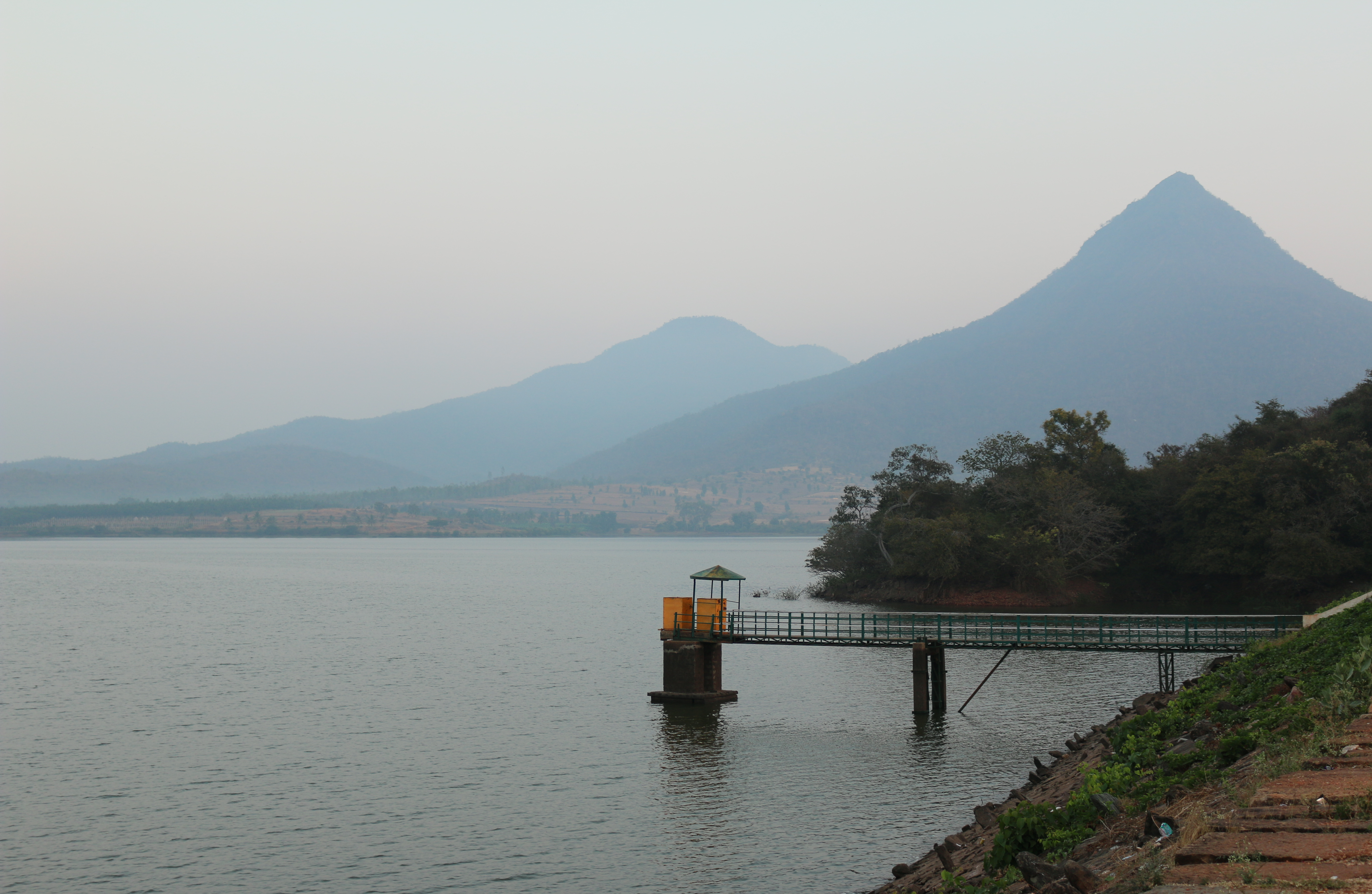
- View of the lake

- Location within Karnataka
- Location: Chikmagalur district, Karnataka, India
- Coordinates: 13.443014°N 75.879976°E
- River sources: Veda
- Catchment area: Krishna Basin

Ayyanakere is a lake near Sakharayapatna village of Karnataka, India and it is located at a distance of 18 kilometres (11 miles) from Chickmagalur. The lake is a major water source for agricultural activity for several villages up to a distance of 15 kilometres (9.3 miles). The lake has 10 canals to distribute water.

== The lake ==
It is believed that the lake was constructed originally by Rukmangada Raya, the ruler of Sakharayapatna village and later renovated during 1156 A.D. by Hoysala Kings. It feeds 1560 hectares of agricultural lands. The lake is known for its beautiful landscape with Shakunagiri hill in the background, but lack of facilities discourage tourists to visit this lake.
