= Aladagudde =

Coordinates: 13°16′N 75°43′E

- Village
- Aladagudde is in Chikkamagaluru District
- Interactive map of Aladagudde
- Country: India
- State: Karnataka
- District: Chikkamagaluru
- Taluk: Chikkamagaluru

Government
  - Body: Village Panchayat

Languages
  - Official: Kannada
- Time zone: UTC+5:30 (IST)
- Nearest city: Chikkamagaluru
- Civic agency: Village Panchayat

Aladagudde is a village in the southern state of Karnataka, India. It is located in the Chikkamagaluru Taluk of Chikkamagaluru District in Karnataka.

== See also ==
- Chikkamagaluru
- Districts of Karnataka
