= Mallandur =

Coordinates: 13.370°N 75.652°E

== Demographics ==
Mallandur is a village in Chikmagalur district in Karnataka, India. It has an elevation of 1243m. It is a popular destination for tourists. Languages spoken in Mallandur include primarily Kannada as well as Tulu.

== Tourism ==
The top three tourist destinations for Mallandur are the Hirekolale Lake, Bhadra Wildlife Sanctuary, and Jhari Waterfalls.

== See also ==
- Muthodi wildlife sanctuary
- Attigundi
