= Lakkavalli =

- Town
- Location in Karnataka, India
- Coordinates: 13°42′5.5″N 75°39′58.6″E
- Country: India
- State: Karnataka
- District: Chikkamagaluru
- Region: Malenadu
- Elevation: 300 m (980 ft)

Population
  - Total: 5,214 (2,559F + 2,655M) According to 2,011 census

Languages
  - Official: Kannada
- Time zone: UTC+5:30 (IST)
- PIN: 577128
- Vehicle registration: KA - 66
- Nearest city: Shivamogga
- Lok Sabha constituency: Chikkamagaluru
- Vidhan Sabha constituency: Tarikere
- Climate: Moderate Tropical (Köppen)
- Website: .in

Lakkavalli is a small town / Hobli in Tarikere Taluk of Chikkamagaluru district, Karnataka state, southern India. Lakkavalli is the site of a dam across the Bhadra River; the dam is used for irrigation and power production and agriculture. Lakkavalli is malnad hobli of Tarikere taluk since it belongs to Malnad region. The biodiversity of the place is well known since the British. The Kuvempu University, which is one of the premier learning centre, is just 7 km from here. The state highway T-M Road (Tarikere-Mangalore Road) passes through the village. A Jain Matha exists here and it is headed by Bhattaraka Swasti Sri Vrushabasena.

== Vegetation ==
The vegetation is of wet deciduous type. This place receives the annual rainfall of more than 120 cm. The temperature varies from 21 degrees Celsius in winter to 39 degrees in summer. Among the flora, commonly found are Sandalwood, Teak, Rosewood and Honne. It is also famous for the Bhadra Wildlife Sanctuary, which is home to over 100 species of flora and fauna. The most commonly found are bison, spotted deer and elephant. This sanctuary is one of the tiger reserves in the state.

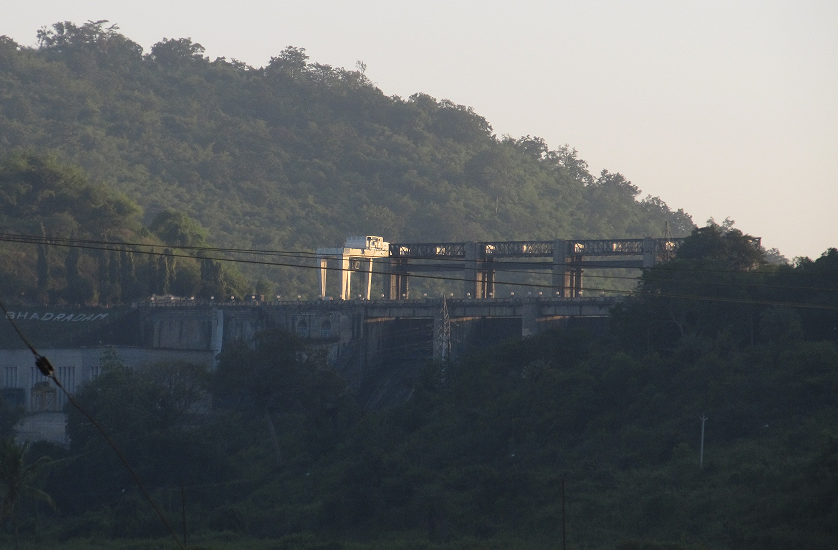
Bhadra Dam

== Dam/reservoir ==
This dam was designed by Sir M. Visvesvaraya, the then chief Engineer of Mysore state. The height of this dam is 194 ft (including building height). The dam is scenic with full of water throughout the year. The reservoir is among the oldest and scenic in Karnataka, which measures 186 ft in height, is having four crest gates. The reservoir is surrounded by the Western Ghats. This multipurpose dam serves the purpose of irrigation as well as there is also a generating station with two turbines. The Bhadra reservoir is the important source for irrigation, drinking and for other industrial activity of Davanagere, Chitradurga district.

== Bhadra Wildlife Sanctuary ==
The back water of the dam has created many forested islands with the hill ranges forming wonderful surroundings. There is also Bhadra wildlife Sanctuary at backwaters of this dam. The Bhadra wildlife sanctuary covers a region of 492 square km. There are tigers, leopards, elephants, and Spotted Deer. The sanctuary has started a tiger-conservation project called 'Project Tiger', an initiative from the Indian Government.

== Tourism ==
The scenic view of the dam and the backwaters itself forms the core of the tourism. The temple of God Shiva Linga also known as Someshwara is on the banks of the River Bhadra which is 5 km from Lakkavalli. Here the annual fair takes place in the month of December/January. Dattatreya Park is coming up next to the temple. The local deity of the village is Kote Marikamba and a grand Marikamba fair, happens every three, five or seven years, which is based on the local legend. One of its kind starts from Sirsi in Uttara Kannada passes through Sagara, Shivamogga, Narasimharajapura (N.R. pura) and some other towns and villages and ends in Lakkavalli.

=== Kote Marikamba Festival ===
The Kote Marikamba Festival is one of the most prominent cultural events in Lakkavalli, attracting thousands of devotees from the surrounding region.

A major ritual associated with the Kote Marikamba fair in Lakkavalli is the Drishti Bottu programme, in which a straw stack is ignited by just placing a small bindi mark on the cheeks of the wooden Marikamba idol. This event is witnessed by tens of thousands of people from the region and is considered a central part of the celebrations. This ritual, initiated by K. T. Govindaswamy Yadav, the ruler of the Yadav dynasty, and it continues to be observed by him and his family in the present day. The festival is historically associated with the Kote family, and involves participation from several local communities, each assigned specific traditional duties. Among these, the Bhovi community, traditionally led by Thimma Bhovi, is recognized for its prominent role.

== Transportation ==
October to January is the ideal time to visit. It is 257 km northwest of Bangalore and is well connected by road. The nearest railway station is in Tarikere which is 20 km away and the nearest airport is in Shivamogga which is 30 km away.

== Agriculture and business ==
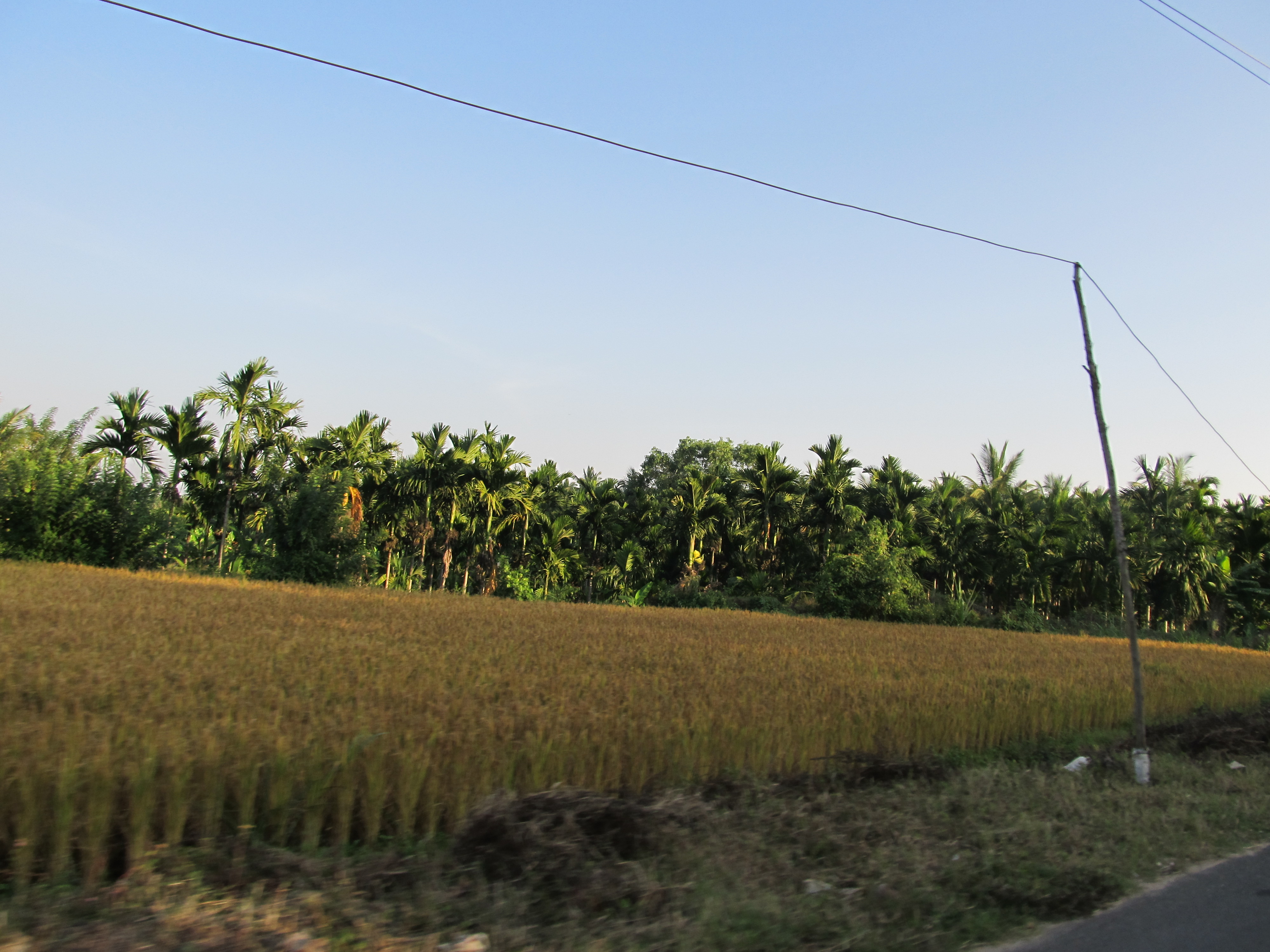
Paddy & Areca nut Field

Rice is the main crop in agriculture followed by Areca nut and Coconut. The main occupation is agriculture, followed by business. Mostly the business commodities are rice and Areca nut followed by coconuts and some forest products. There are eight to ten rice mills in and around Lakkavalli with Dattatreya rice mill rangenhalli, Sai Natha, Bhadra, Modern, Prakash, Bharat Rice mill etc. to name a few. The Teak and Rosewood of Lakkavalli are famous.

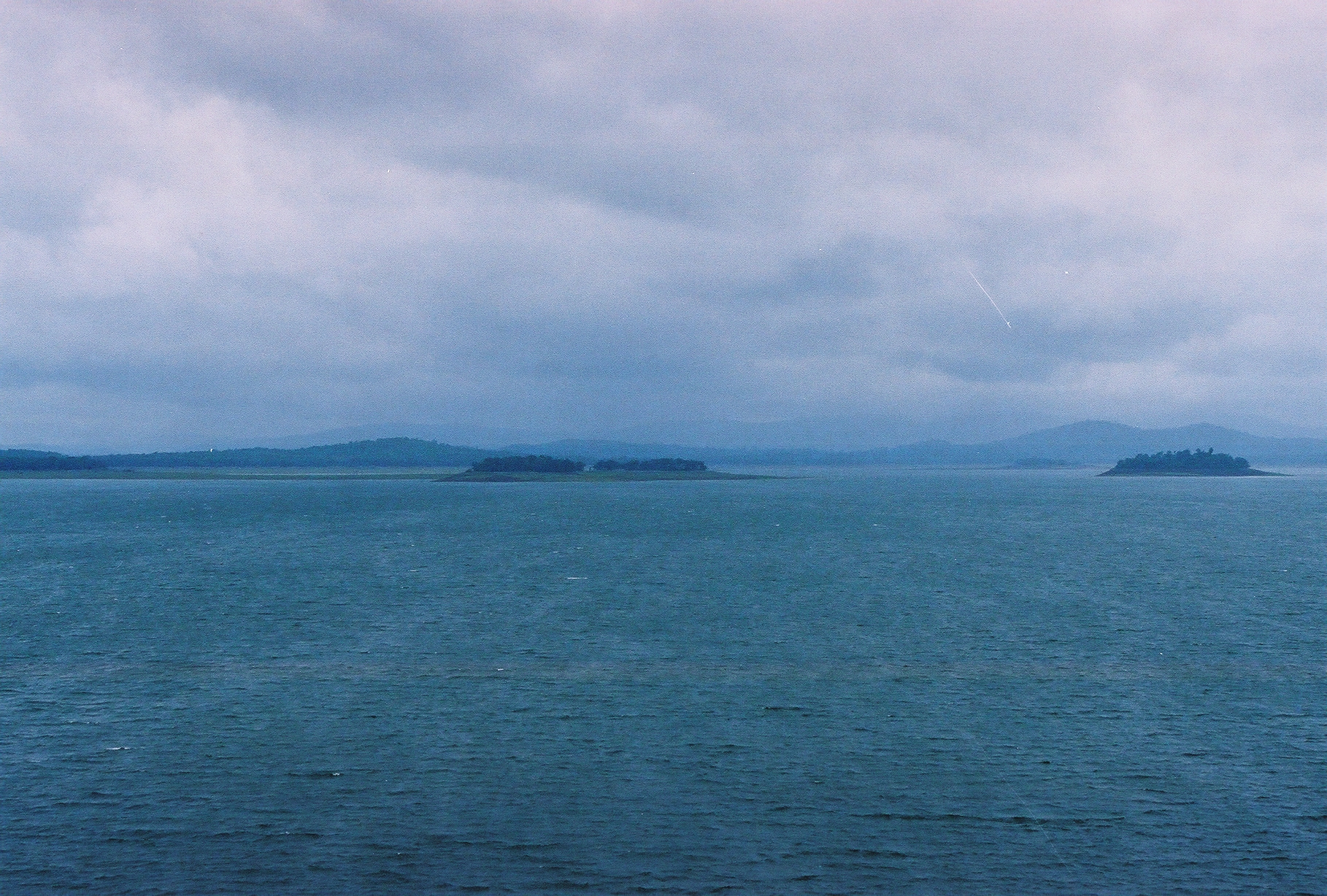
Bhadra reservoir

== Geography and demography ==
- Area: 8 km^{2}
- Population: around 8000.
- Occupation: Agriculture, Fishing and some forest-based activities.
- Local deities: Someshwara temple which is built by the Hoysala kings with 1000 stones in a short time. Kadali Ranganatha Swamy, Anjaneya, Kote Marikamba.
- Intercity transportation: Private buses.
- Pin Code: 577128
