= State Highway 57 (Karnataka) =

Road in Karnataka, India

State Highway 57

Route information
- Maintained by KPWD
- Length: 719.05 km (446.80 mi)

Location
- Country: India
- State: Karnataka
- Primary destinations: Bagalakote, Badami, Gadag, Ranibennur, Shikaripura, Shivamogga, Chikmagalur, Hassan, Holenarasipura and K R Nagar, Nanjangud, B R Hills

Highway system
- Roads in India; Expressways; National; State; Asian; State Highways in Karnataka

Karnataka State Highway 57, commonly referred to as KA SH 57, is a normal state highway that runs north through many districts in the state of Karnataka. This state highway touches numerous cities and villages Viz.Shimoga, Chikmagalur, Hassan and K R Nagar. The total length of the highway is 719.05 km.

== Route description ==
The route followed by this highway is Bagalakote – Badami – Ron – Huyalgola – Gadag – Sirahatti – Ranibennur – Shikaripura – Shivamogga – Lakkavalli – Tarikere – Chikamagalur – Belur – Hassan – Holenarasipura – K R Nagar – Nanjangud – Biligiri Rangana Betta. It has a total length of 719.05 kilometres (446.80 mi).

== Major junctions ==
Bagalakote – Badami – Gadag – Ranibennur – Shikaripura – Shivamogga – Tarikere – Chikamagalur – Belur – Hassan – Holenarasipura – K R Nagar – Bilikere - Hampapura - Nanjangud – Biligiriranga Hills

== See also ==
- List of state highways in Karnataka
