= Sakharayapatna =

Sakharayapatna Sakrepatna
- Panchayat Town
- Sakharayapatna
- Location in Karnataka, India
- Coordinates: 13.431757°N 75.924549°E
- Country: India
- State: Karnataka
- District: Chikkamagaluru
- Taluk: Kadur
- Region: Malenadu

Government
  - Body: Grama Panchayath

Area
  - Total: 31.33 km^{2} (12.10 sq mi)
- Elevation: 847 m (2,779 ft)

Population (2011)
  - Total: 6,087
  - Density: 194.3/km^{2} (503.2/sq mi)

Languages
  - Official: Kannada
- Time zone: UTC+5:30 (IST)
- PIN: 577135
- Telephone code: 08267
- Vehicle registration: KA-18, KA-66

Sakharayapatna is a panchayat town in Chikmagalur district in the Indian state of Karnataka. This town is situated in Malenadu region. The town is midway between Kadur - Chikkamagaluru on NH-173; 18 km (11 mi) from Kadur, 23 km (14 mi) from Chikmagalur, 174 km (108 mi) from Mangalore, and 226 km (140 mi) from Bengaluru.

The name of the town literally means "the town of the ruler named Sakharaya" in the Kannada language.

Sakharayapatna and the surrounding region produce areca nuts and jackfruits.
