= Bhadra Dam =

Dam in Karnataka, India

Bhadra dam
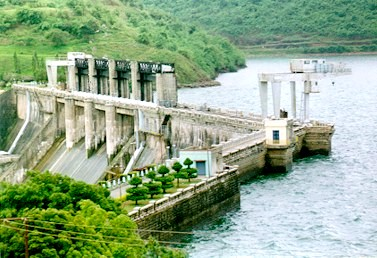
- Bhadra Dam and Reservoir

- Location within India Location within Karnataka
- Official name: Bhadra
- Location: Bhadravathi and Tarikere border
- Coordinates: 13°42′0″N 75°38′24″E
- Construction cost: Rs.520 crores
- Operators: Water Resources Department and Karnataka Power Corporation Limited

Dam and spillways
- Impounds: Bhadra River, a tributary of Tungabhadra River
- Height: 59.13 metres (194.0 ft)
- Length: 1,708 metres (5,604 ft)

Reservoir
- Creates: Multipurpose
- Total capacity: 71.50 billion cubic feet
- Catchment area: 1,968 km^{2} (760 mi^{2})
- Surface area: 11,250.88 hectares (27,801.5 acres)hectares

The Bhadra Dam or Lakkavalli Dam, which has created the Bhadra Reservoir, is located on the Bhadra River a tributary of Tungabhadra River. Bhadra Dam is located in Chikmagalur district on the border of Bhadravathi and Tarikere, in the western part of Karnataka in India. The benefits derived from the reservoir storage are irrigation with gross irrigation potential of 162,818 hectares (402,330 acres), hydro power generation of 39.2 MW (three powerhouses, located on the right and left bank main canals), drinking water supply and industrial use. The dam commissioned in 1965 is a composite earth cum masonry structure of 59.13 metres (194.0 ft) height with length of 1,708 metres (5,604 ft) at the crest level, which submerges a land area of 11,250.88 hectares (27,801.5 acres).

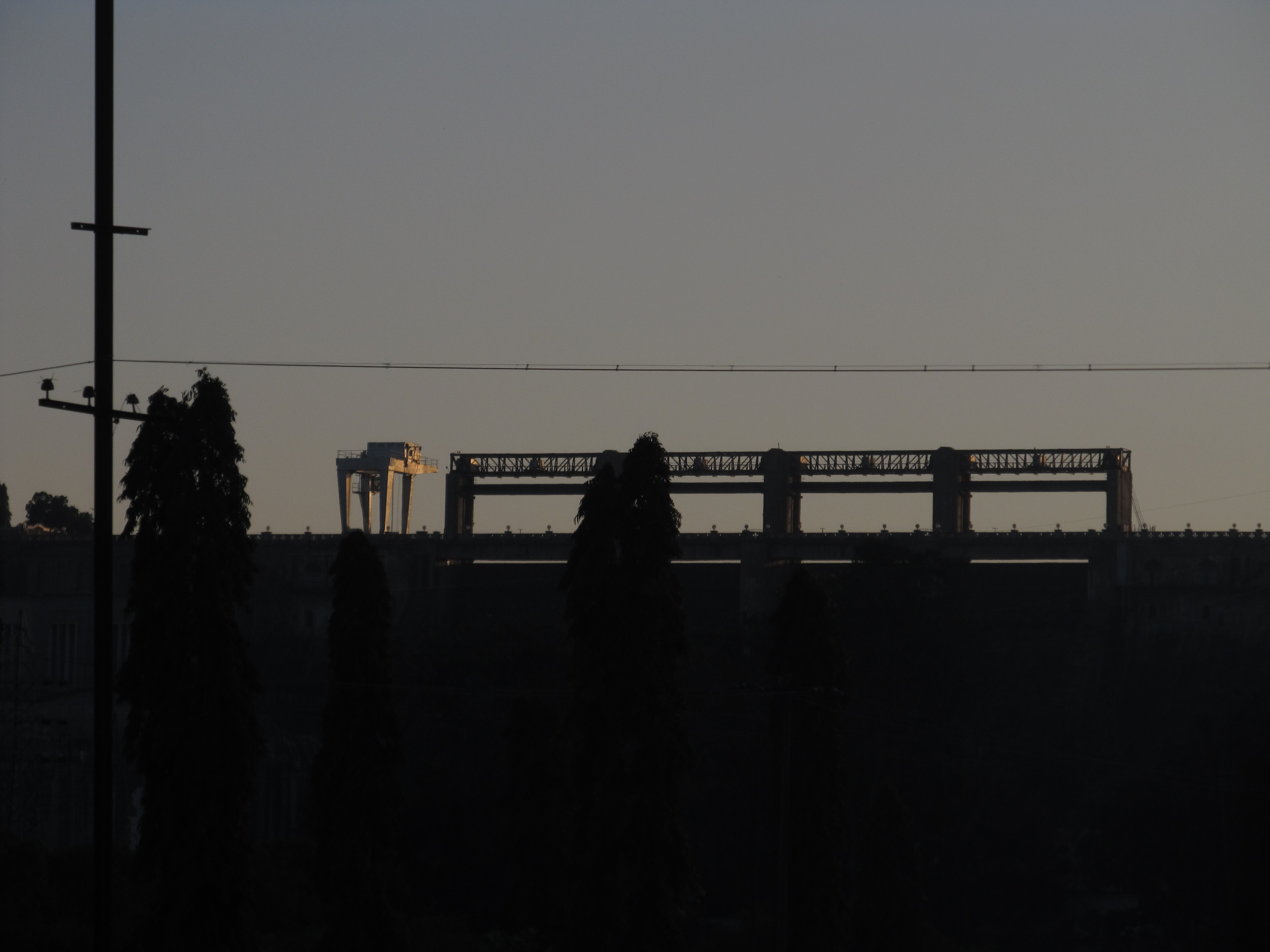
Bhadra Dam Building

== Geography ==
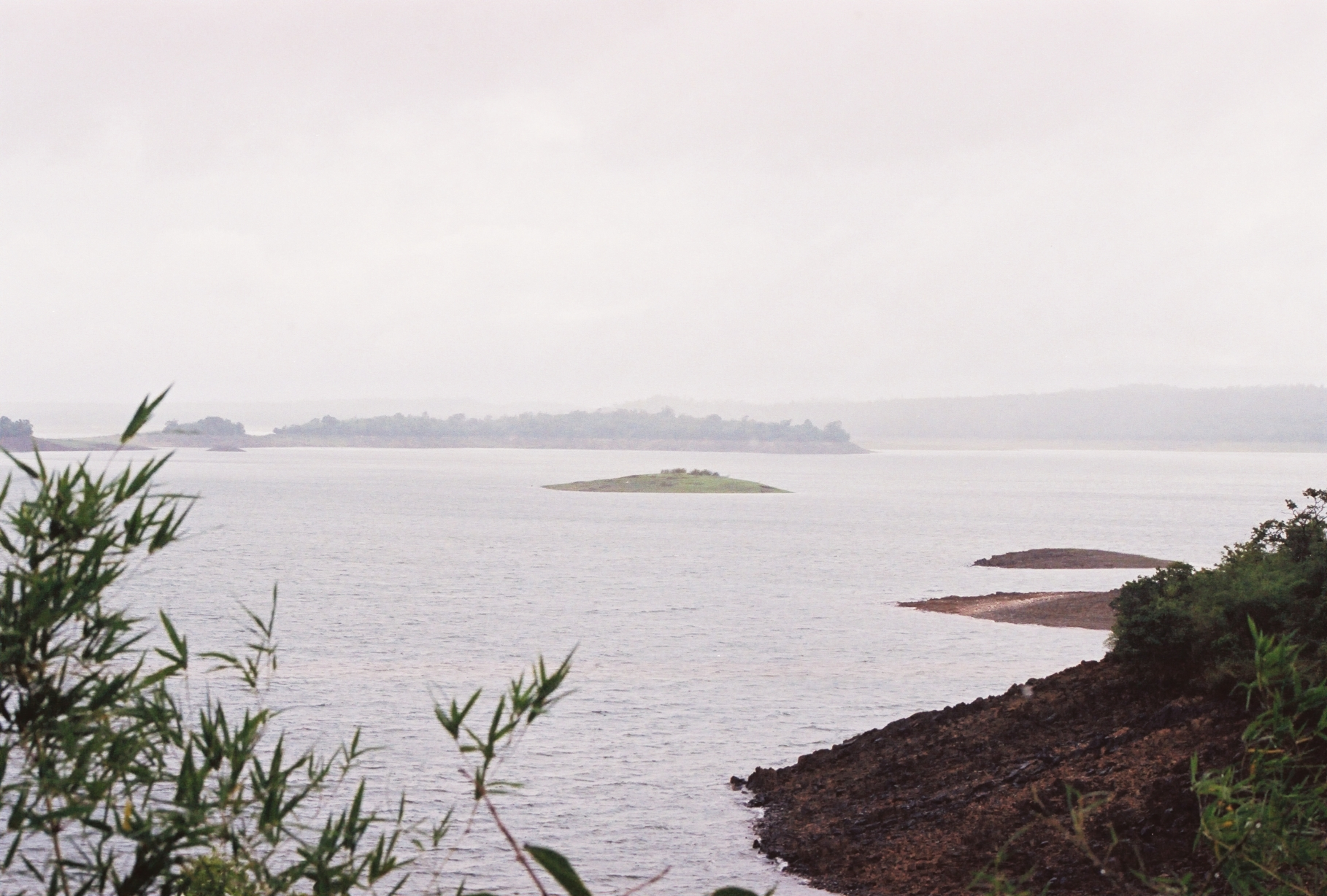
Bhadra Reservoir and the islands

The Bhadra River rises at Samse in the Western Ghats Aroli hill range of Kudremukh range, Chikkamagaluru district and flows east across the Deccan Plateau. It is joined by its tributaries, the Somavahini (drains from a crater and meets Bhadra River at Hebbe), Thadabehalla, and Odirayanahalla.The more than 90% of the catchment area lies in Chikkamagaluru District. The river flows through the city of Bhadravathi and the Bhadra Wildlife Sanctuary. The Bhadra meets the Tunga River at Koodli, a small town near Shivamogga. The combined river continues east as the Tungabhadra, a major tributary of the Krishna, which empties into the Bay of Bengal. The Bhadra Dam is built across the Bhadra River in Lakkavalli- Tarikere taluk. Lies 0.5 kilometres (0.31 mi) from Singanamane village (Bhadravathi taluk), 1.5 kilometres (0.93 mi) from Lakkavalli village (Tarikere taluk) and 50 kilometres (31 mi) upstream of the confluence of the Bhadra River and Tungabhadra River. Shimoga city is located 28 kilometres (17 mi) north of the dam. The Bhadra Dam drains a catchment area of 1,968 square kilometres (760 mi^{2}) out of which the forest area is 717.49 hectares (1,773.0 acres), cultivable land is 3,274.65 hectares (8,091.8 acres) and fallow land is 7,258.74 hectares (17,936.7 acres). A number of industries, urban and rural settlements dependent on assured water supply lie on the banks of the river and in the project command area; Kudremukh Iron Ore Company Ltd, the Mysore Paper Mills and Vishweshvarayya Iron and Steel Industries are the major industrial activity noted in the command area of the project.

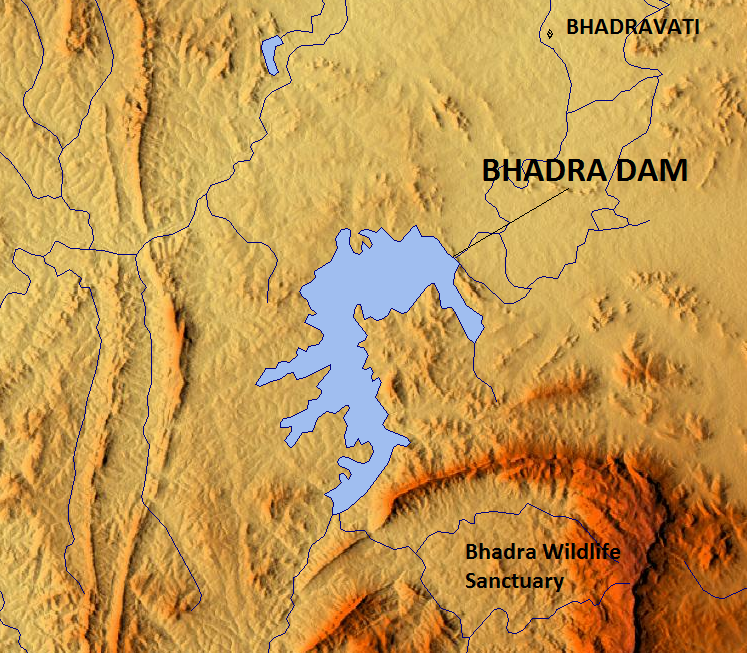
Map

The Bhadra River basin receives an average annual rainfall of 2320 mm with rainfall occurring during monsoon period (June to November). The rainfall is experienced both during the Southwest Monsoon and North East monsoon; inflow contribution is 82% from SW monsoon (June to September) and 18% from north-eastern monsoon (October to December). The annual yield assessed from a catchment area of 1,968 square kilometres (760 mi^{2}) at the dam site is 84.63 BCF (billion cubic feet) in a 75% dependable year. Based on recordings taken over a period of 25 years, it has an estimated annual mean evapotranspiration of 1,678 mm.

== Project features ==
The Bhadra Dam project was the irrigation scheme to be undertaken by the National Water Management Project (NWMP), with the aim of increasing agricultural prosperity, particularly for rice production. The dam was built to a height of 59.13 metres (194.0 ft) (above the river bed level) between 1947 (start of construction) and 1965 (year of commissioning). It has a gross storage capacity of 2.025 km^{3}, live storage of 63.00 BCF at full reservoir level and a dead storage of 8.50 BCF at RL (reservoir level) of 631.54 metres (2,072.0 ft). The storage created by the reservoir is according to the allocation of 61.70 BCF (1.747 km^{3} including direct evaporation of 0.14 km^{3}) of water made under the Krishna Water Disputes Tribunal Award. The dam is built on a shattered rock based with a central masonry spillway. It has an earthen embankment on the left side and a rock hillock on the opposite side. The Ogee type spillway in the middle section of the river has been provided with four numbers of vertical lift gates over a width of 18.28 metres (60.0 ft) and designed for a discharge of 3,020 cubic metres (107,000 ft^{3})/s. In addition, two number river sluices are also provided to pass a discharge of 13,300 cubic metres (470,000 ft^{3})/s. The annual siltation load considered in the design is 10.78 million cubic feet per square kilometer of catchment area. The canal outlets provided in the dam, initially for Hydropower generation followed by irrigation, consists of the left Bank canal outlet to discharge 10.76 cubic metres (380 ft^{3})/s and two right bank canal outlets to pass a discharge of 75.03 cubic metres (2,650 ft^{3})/s. There are several islands in the reservoir area which have been developed for tourism.

The dam has four spillway gates. The gate type is not exactly pronounced as either Ogee or Radial. This dam falls under the Parliamentary Constituency of Udupi Chikmagalur. The dam is classified as Earthen/ Gravity & Masonry.

The reservoir created by the dam submerged 27 villages.

The Left Bank Canal is designed to carry a discharge of 10.76 cubic metres (380 ft^{3})/s, starting from the tail race of the left bank powerhouse provides irrigation facilities over its total length of 77 kilometres (48 mi). The Right Bank canal, originating from the tail race channel of the right bank powerhouse provides irrigation facilities through its length of the main canal of 103 kilometres (64 mi) designed to carry a discharge of 75.03 cubic metres (2,650 ft^{3})/s and its branch canal system of 284.9 kilometres (177.0 mi). Gross command area from the project is 162,818 hectares (402,330 acres), cultivable command is 121,500 hectares (300,000 acres) and irrigated command and cropped area is 105,570 hectares (260,900 acres). The soils encountered in the Right Bank Canal irrigation command consisted of Black Cotton Soils 8.5% and Red soil 93.5%, while on the Left Bank Canal command it comprises Black Cotton Soils 7.0% and Red soil 93%.

The irrigation component of the project was planned to provide an annual cropping intensity of 200 percent to irrigate semi-dry crops in nearly 60 percent of the command area dominated by red loamy soils. Irrigated area spreads over Davanagere, Shivamogga, Chikmagalur and Bellary districts comprising predominantly red loamy soils except in some portions of the right bank canal area which consist of Black Cotton soils. However, the actual cropping was predominately rice and also sugarcane and permanent gardens; 90% area on the left bank canal system and 60% area of the right bank canal system was dominated by rice. This practice resulted in heavy demand on water causing serious concerns on the irrigation system itself. Consequently, National Water Management Project (NWMP) was launched with the objective to "rehabilitate and provide more equitable, predictable and reliable irrigation service which could improve agricultural productivity and farm income". This project has resulted in substantial improvements in both the area brought under irrigation and consequent agricultural crop production.

The water stored in the reservoir is diverted through the right and left bank power houses into the respective irrigation canal systems. The right bank powerhouse utilises the irrigation releases for power generation from two units of Kaplan-type turbine generators and one unit of 6MW capacity. The left bank powerhouse at the river bed utilizes the irrigation releases to generate power from two units of 12 MW capacity each and another power house on the left bank canal of one unit of 2 MW capacity. The three power stations together have a power generation capacity of 39.2 MW.

== Ecology ==
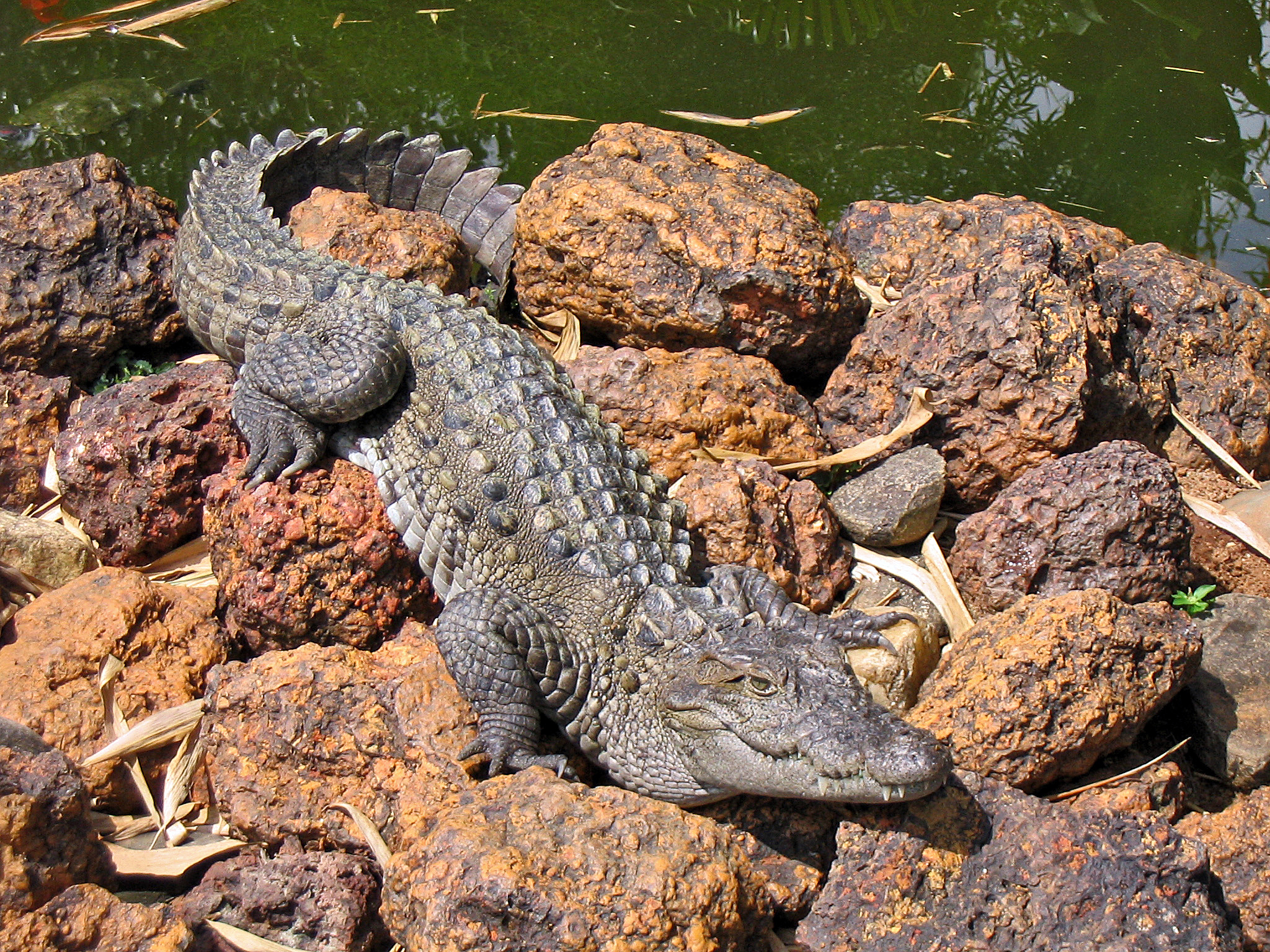
Marsh crocodiles found in abundance in the Bhadra River and Bhadra Reservoir

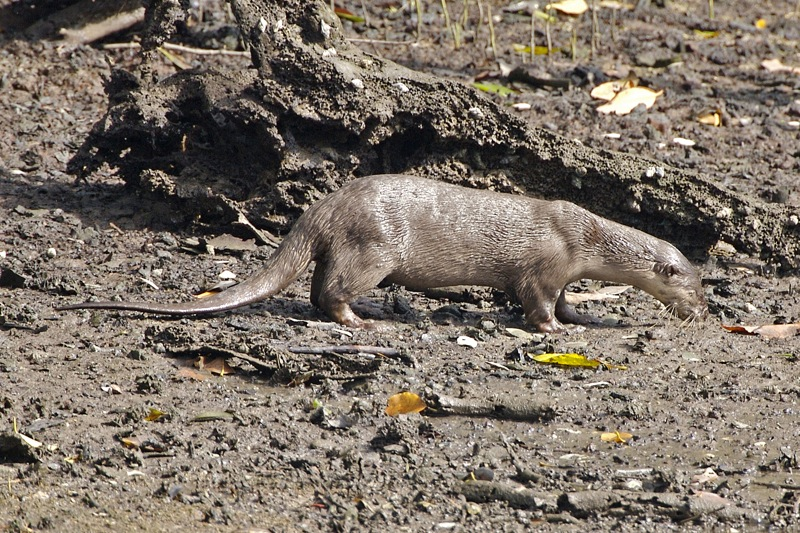
Smooth-coated otter found in the reservoir

The Bhadra River flows through the Bhadra Tiger Reserve and Wildlife Sanctuary and the Bhadra Reservoir is on its northern border. The sanctuary has rich avifauna such as junglefowl, red spurfowl, painted bush-quail, emerald dove, southern green imperial pigeon, great black woodpecker, Malabar parakeet and hill myna. Reptiles reported in the river and the reservoir are the marsh crocodiles and monitor lizards. Common river otter and smooth Indian otters, gaurs and leopards are commonly sighted in the reserve. The wildlife can be viewed by taking a boat ride in the reservoir when Tyavarekoppa Lion and Tiger Safari and the Sakkrebyle Elephant Camp can also be visited.

Marsh crocodiles are found all along the Bhadra River and more so after the river enters the sanctuary area and further flows through midst of the undisturbed moist deciduous forests till it joins the back waters of the reservoir of the Bhadra Dam.
