= Jhari Falls =

Waterfall in Karnataka, India

- Buttermilk Falls; Dabdabe Falls
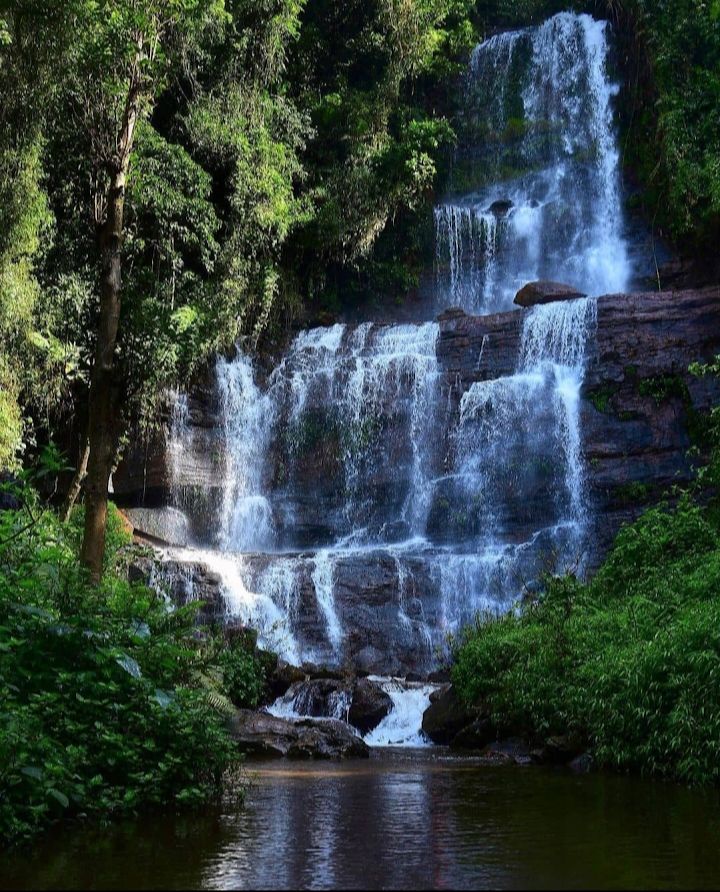
- Jhari Falls
- Interactive map of Jhari Falls
- Location: Karnataka, India
- Coordinates: 13°23′26″N 75°43′18″E
- Type: Cataract, Segmented
- Elevation: 560 m (1,840 ft)
- Total height: 50–70 m (160–230 ft)

Jhari Falls is a waterfall in Chikmagalur district in Karnataka state, India, near Mullayanagiri and Baba Budan Giri. Water originating in the mountains flows over steep rocks, in a wide and thin white layer.

The waterfall is 267 km from Bengaluru and 24 km from Chikmagalur. Kadur Junction is the nearest railway station (57 km) and Mangaluru Airport is the nearest airport (180 kms). Taxis can be hired from Kadur or Chikmagalur, but the last five km to the falls are accessible only via jeep.

== See also ==
- List of waterfalls
- List of waterfalls in Karnataka
- List of waterfalls in India
- List of waterfalls in India by height
