= Kaduru =

Kaduru Kadur
- Town
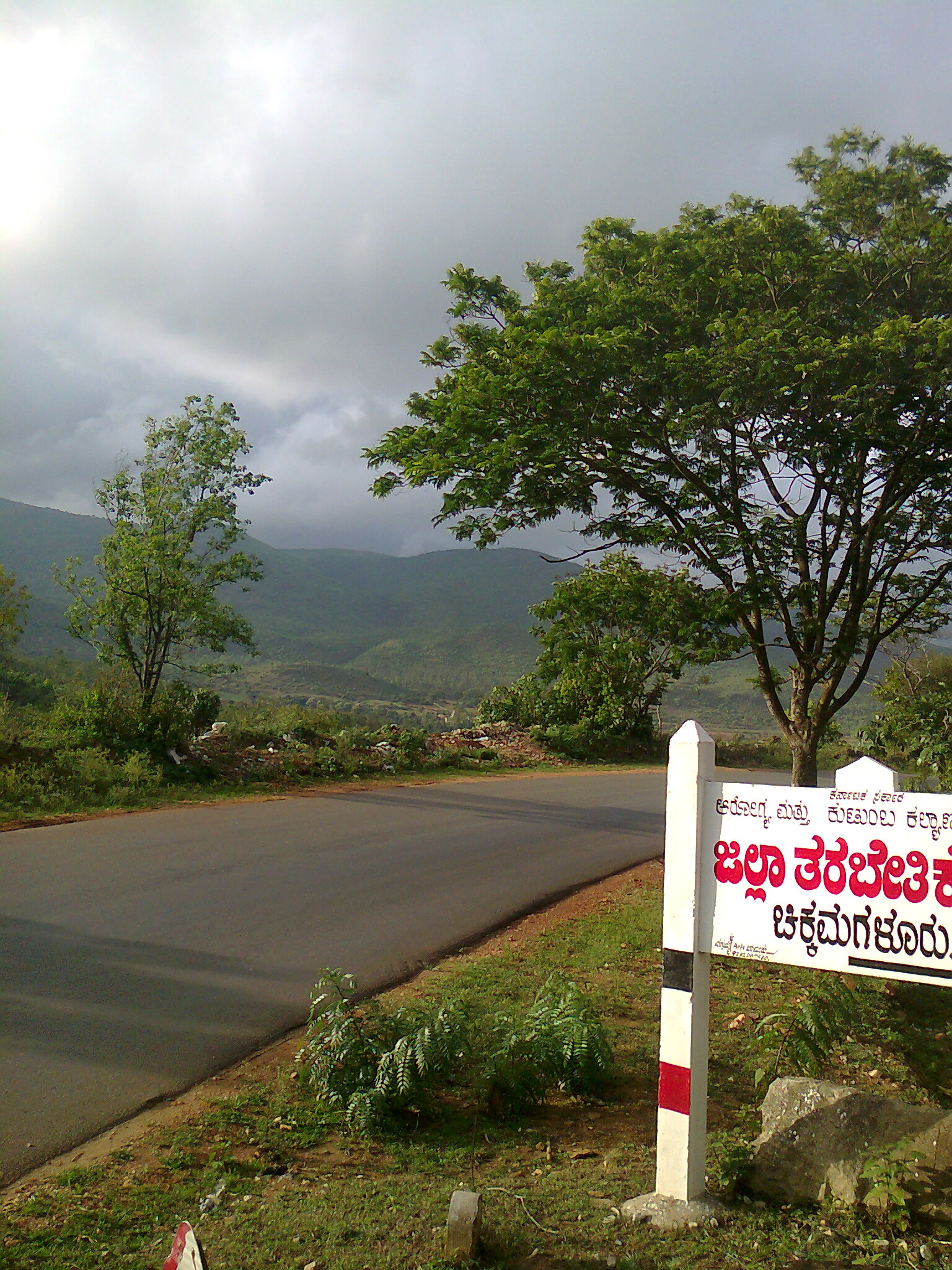
- Kadur
- Interactive map of Kaduru
- Location in Karnataka, India
- Coordinates: 13.553345°N 76.011260°E
- Country: India
- State: Karnataka
- District: Chikmagalur
- Region: Malenadu / Rain shadow / Bayaluseeme

Government
  - Body: Town Municipal Council

Area
  - Town: 10.3 km^{2} (4.0 sq mi)
  - Rural: 1,414 km^{2} (546 sq mi)
- Elevation: 763 m (2,503 ft)

Population (2011)
  - Town: 34,151
  - Density: 3,320/km^{2} (8,590/sq mi)
  - Rural: 291,668

Languages
  - Official: Kannada
- Time zone: UTC+5:30 (IST)
- PIN: 577548
- Vehicle registration: KA-18 & KA-66
- Website: www.kadurtown.mrc.gov.in

Kaduru, also known as Kadur, is a town and a taluk in the Chikkamagaluru district of Karnataka, India. It lies in the eastern part of Chikmagalur district, which is a rain shadow region of Malenadu. Kadur is also well known for its Areca nut and Coconut production.

It is the second largest town in the district and also the former capital of Kadur district (Cuddoor district). The capital was moved to Chikmagalur in 1865, but the district name remained. Later in 1947, the district was renamed as Chikmagalur district.

== History ==
Inscriptions note that Jains settled in what is present-day Kadur during the reign of the Western Gangas. The region then came under the Hoysala Kingdom and subsequently the Vijayanagara Empire. During this period, the 14th-century, the lands around the hills of Yemmedoddi were conferred upon a dependent named Mada Nayak. When he went hunting one day, he was pursued by an Sambar Deer (transl. Kadave), which led him to lay the foundation of a fort, called Kad-uru (Sambar Deer town).

The town, which served as the headquarters of a taluk of the same name, then passed on to the hands of the Nayakas of Keladi. Kadur taluk, along with Yagati, were then taken by the Mysore Kings, who gave it to chief of Tarikere, in return for services rendered by him. However, Hyder Ali annexed the taluk to Mysore. Later, by 1835, Yagati was absorbed into Kadur taluk. In 1876, Kadur and Banavara were formed into one taluk, named after Banavara, which was the chief town. In 1882, Kadur was once again made the headquarters of the taluk, and in 1886, on the formation of the neighbouring Arsikere taluk, Kadur taluk was reconstituted. This time, Sakrepatna and portions of the Banavara taluk were added to it.

== Geography ==
Kadur is located in the eastern part of Chikmagalur district, which has a semi-arid climate. Its elevation is around 760 metres above the mean sea level. It has a dry climate with annual rainfall less than 750 millimetres (30 in).

=== Rainfall ===
In 2018, Kadur hobli received annual rainfall of 747 millimetres (29.4 in).

In 2022, Kadur hobli received an annual rainfall of 1,004 millimetres (39.5 in), which was excess by 57%. Meanwhile, both Sakharayapatna and Panchanahalli hoblis received 1,130 millimetres (44 in) of rainfall each; highest in Kadur taluk.

In 2024, Kadur hobli received 926 millimetres (36.5 in) of annual rainfall.

== Demographics ==
As of 2001 India census, Kadur had a population of 35436. Males constitute 51% of the population and females 49%. Kadur has an average literacy rate of 68%, higher than the national average of 59.5%: male literacy is 73%, and female literacy is 63%. In Kadur, 12% of the population is under 6 years of age.

== Transportation ==
Kadur has two modes of transportation; Road and Rail. Kadur town is situated on Bengaluru - Honnavar highway. The National Highway 69 (formerly NH-206) now forms a part of BH Road. The Kadur-Mangaluru Road(KM Road), which was(during the British) and is, the prime Coffee trade route of the region, has now been upgraded to NH-173. The Kadur Junction is a newer railway junction on Bangalore-Arsikere-Hubli line, 7 km from an older, but significant Birur Junction. The nearest airport is Rashtrakavi Kuvempu Airport, Shimoga, which is 76 km and KIA Bengaluru is 228 km away.

The public transport company, The KSRTC has a Bus Stand and a Bus Depot under Chikkamagaluru division. Even the private players have a significant hold on rural connectivity.
