= Hebbe Falls =

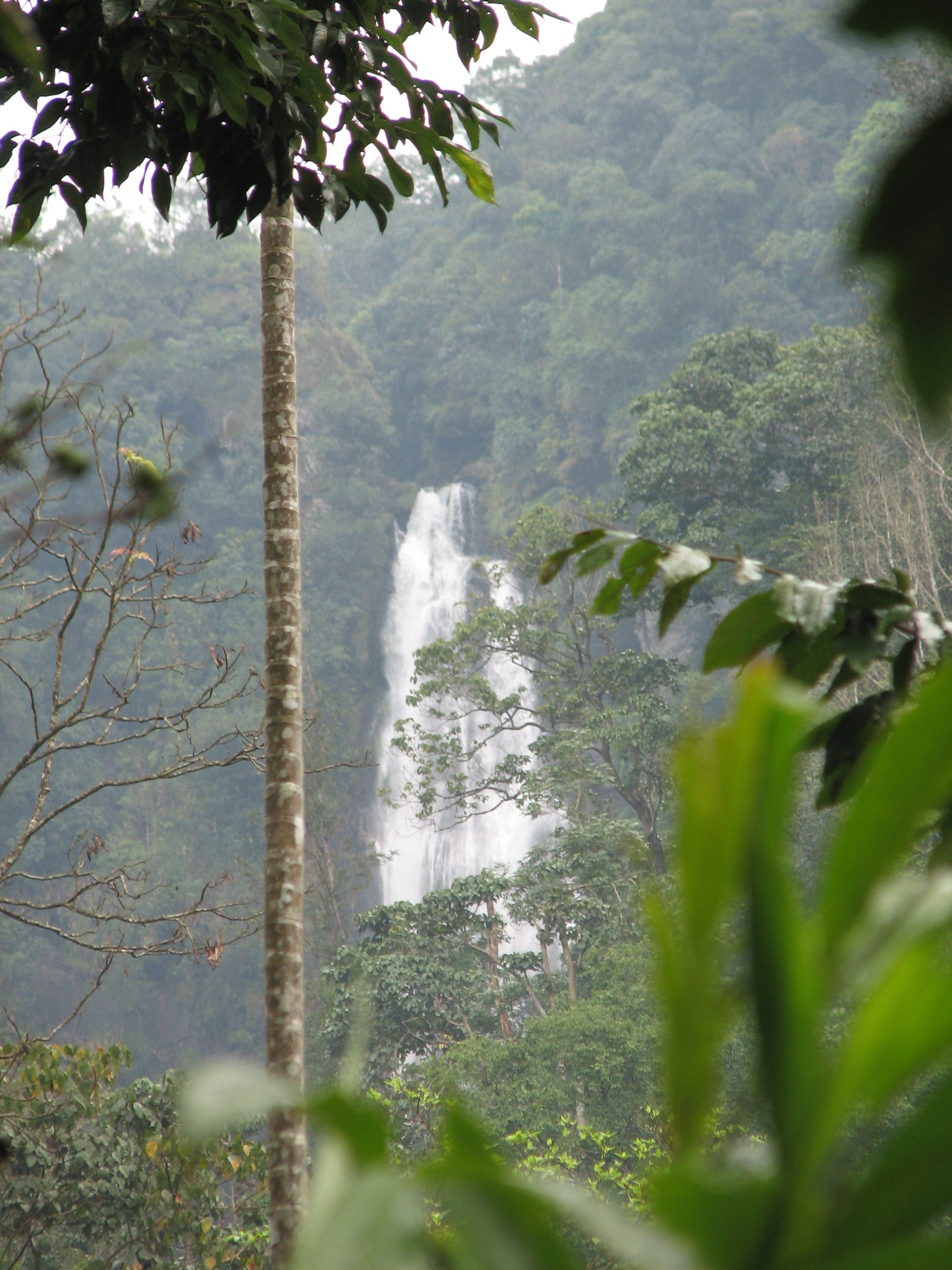
- Interactive map of Hebbe Falls
- Location: Kemmangundi, Chikmagalur district, Karnataka
- Type: Tiered
- Total height: 551 ft (168 m)
- Watercourse: River Bhadra

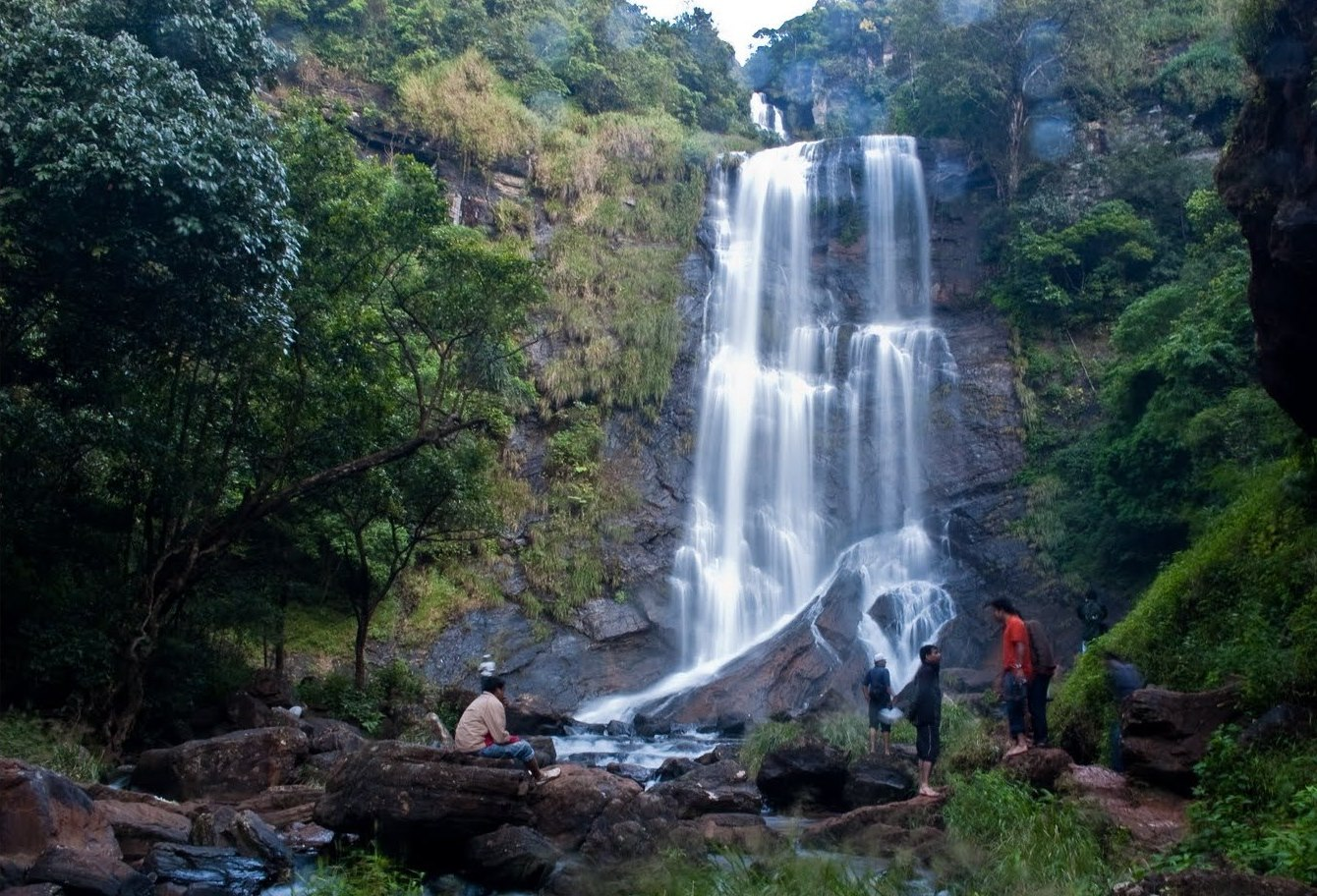
Hebbe falls

Hebbe Falls is situated at 13°32′29″N 75°43′30″E about 10 km away from the hill station Kemmangundi in Karnataka, India. The waterfall is inside a coffee estate. Hebbe Falls gushes from a height of 551 ft in two stages to form Dodda Hebbe (Big Falls) and Chikka Hebbe (Small Falls.)

== See also ==
- List of waterfalls
- List of waterfalls in India
- List of waterfalls in India by height
