= Bhadra Wildlife Sanctuary =

Protected area and tiger reserve in Karnataka, India

- IUCN category IV (habitat/species management area)
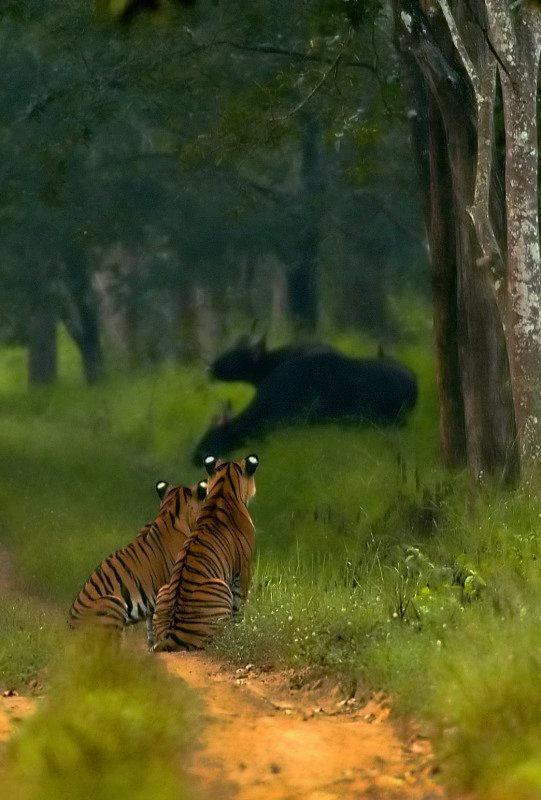
- Tigers keeping a close eye on gaurs in Bhadra Wildlife Sanctuary

- Location within Karnataka Location within India
- Interactive map of Bhadra Wildlife Sanctuary
- Location: Chikkamagaluru District, Karnataka, India
- Nearest city: Chikkamagaluru
- Coordinates: 13°41′43.72″N 75°38′12.53″E
- Area: 892.46 km^{2} (344.58 sq mi)
- Max. elevation: 1,875 m (6,152 ft)
- Min. elevation: 615 m (2,018 ft)
- Established: 1951
- Governing body: Ministry of Environment and Forests, Government of India

Bhadra Wildlife Sanctuary is a wildlife sanctuary and tiger reserve in the state of Karnataka, India. It hosts a wide range of flora and fauna. The 1,875 m (6,152 ft) high Hebbe Giri is the highest peak in the sanctuary.

== Geography ==
Bhadra Wildlife Sanctuary consists of two adjacent sections. The main western Lakkavalli-Muthodi section lies from 13˚22’ to 13˚47’ N latitude, 75˚29’ to 75˚45’ E longitude, and the smaller eastern Bababudangiri section from 13˚30’ to 13˚33’ N latitude, and 75˚44’ to 75˚47’ E longitude. Elevation varies from 615 to 1,875 m (2,018 to 6,152 ft); the highest point is Kallathigiri on the eastern boundary. The sanctuary is surrounded by the scenic hills and steep slopes of the Mullayanagiri, Hebbegiri, Gangegiri, and Bababudangiri hills. The 1,930 m (6,330 ft) Mullayanagiri peak in the Baba Budan Giri Range, near the southeast edge of the sanctuary is the highest peak between the Himalayas and the Nilgiri mountains.

The 168 m (551 ft) high Hebbe Falls are in the eastern part of the sanctuary. The Manikyadhara Falls is located on the nearby sacred Baba Budan Giri Hill, The tributaries of the Bhadra River flow west through the sanctuary. The western border of the sanctuary abuts the Bhadra Reservoir and is part of its catchment area of 1,968 km^{2} (760 sq mi).

== Climate ==
Temperatures vary from 10˚ to 35 °C and mean annual rainfall varies from 1200 mm to 2600 mm.

== History ==
The area was first declared as 'Jagara Valley Wildlife Sanctuary' in 1951 by the then government of its surroundings, the area was extended to its present extent and renamed to Bhadra Wildlife Sanctuary in 1974.

The Wildlife Sanctuary was declared as a Project Tiger Reserve in 1998. Bhadra is the first tiger reserve in the country to complete a successful village relocation program. The original relocation plan was introduced in 1974 and was implemented completely by 2002 when the 26 villages in the sanctuary were successfully relocated to M C Halli which is about 50 km (31 mi) from the Sanctuary.

== Wildlife ==
Bhadra Wildlife Sanctuary is the biodiversity hotspot. Most of the area consists the wet deciduous forest, moist deciduous forest and green forests. Elevations ranging from 615 m (2,018 ft) to 1,875 m (6,152 ft) allows a variety of ecotypes including the unique shola forest/ mountain grasslands complex at Bababudan Giri and other patches higher than 1,400 m (4,600 ft) .

=== Flora ===
Bhadra supports more than 120 plant species. One typical 2 ha (4.9 acres) of tropical dry deciduous forest had 46 species, 37 genera and 24 families. Combretaceae was the most abundant family in the forest. Indigoberry (Randia dumetorum) was the dominant species. Throughout the sanctuary the common species include crepe myrtle (lanceolata), kadam, thaasal (tiliaefolia), simpoh (pentagyna), teak, kindal, bahera, rosewood, Indian kino tree, white teak, fig tree, mangosteen, Kydia calycina, indigo, toddy palm, Ceylon oak, jalari, jamba tree, axlewood, slow match tree, thorny bamboo and clumping bamboo.

It is the habitat of valuable teak and rosewood. Other commercial timber in the sanctuary includes: mathi, honne, Nandi, tadasalu and kindal. There is also bamboo and several types of medicinal plants.

=== Fauna ===
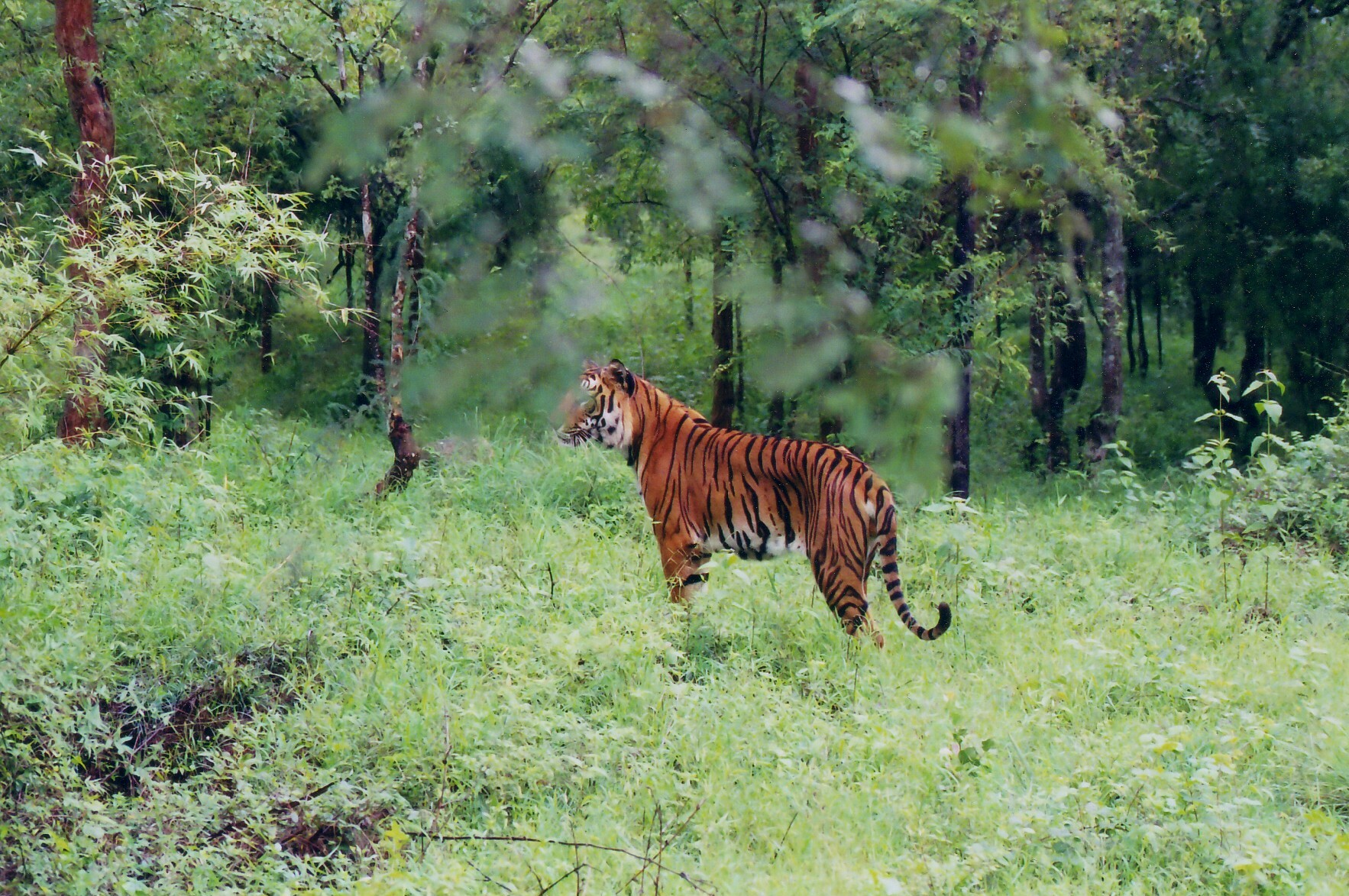
Tiger in Bhadra Wildlife Sanctuary

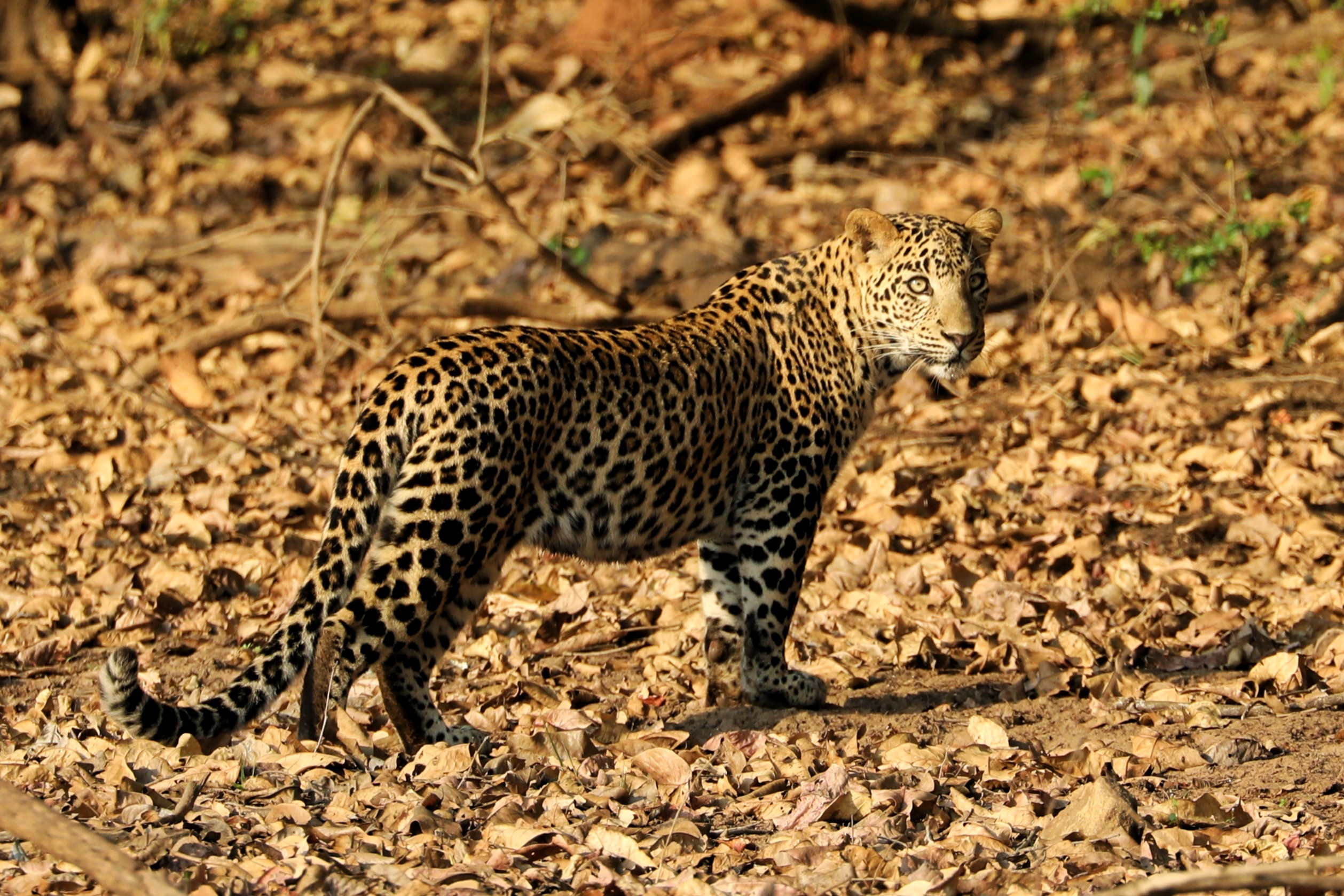
Indian Leopard at Bhadra Wildlife Sanctuary

An estimated 33 tigers are found in Bhadra. Other animals in the sanctuary include elephant, Indian leopard, gaur, sloth bear, wild boar, black leopard, jungle cat, jackal, wild dog, sambar, spotted deer, barking deer, mouse deer, common langur, bonnet macaque, slender loris, small Indian civet, common palm civet, pangolin, porcupine, flying squirrel and the Malabar giant squirrel.

Small carnivores in Bhadra Wildlife Sanctuary include leopard cat, rusty-spotted cat, ruddy mongoose, stripe-necked mongoose and otters.

Large animal census of Bhadra
Species	1993	1997
Tiger	25	33
Leopard	11	21
Elephant	161	203
Gaur	139	186
Chital		780
Sambar		518
Bonnet macaque		248
Wild boar		470
Muntjac		749

==== Reptiles ====
Some of the reptiles commonly sighted in this park are common vine snake, king cobra, Indian cobra, Russell's viper, bamboo pit viper, rat snake, olive keelback, common wolf snake, Bengal monitor, Draco or gliding lizards and marsh crocodile.

==== Birds ====
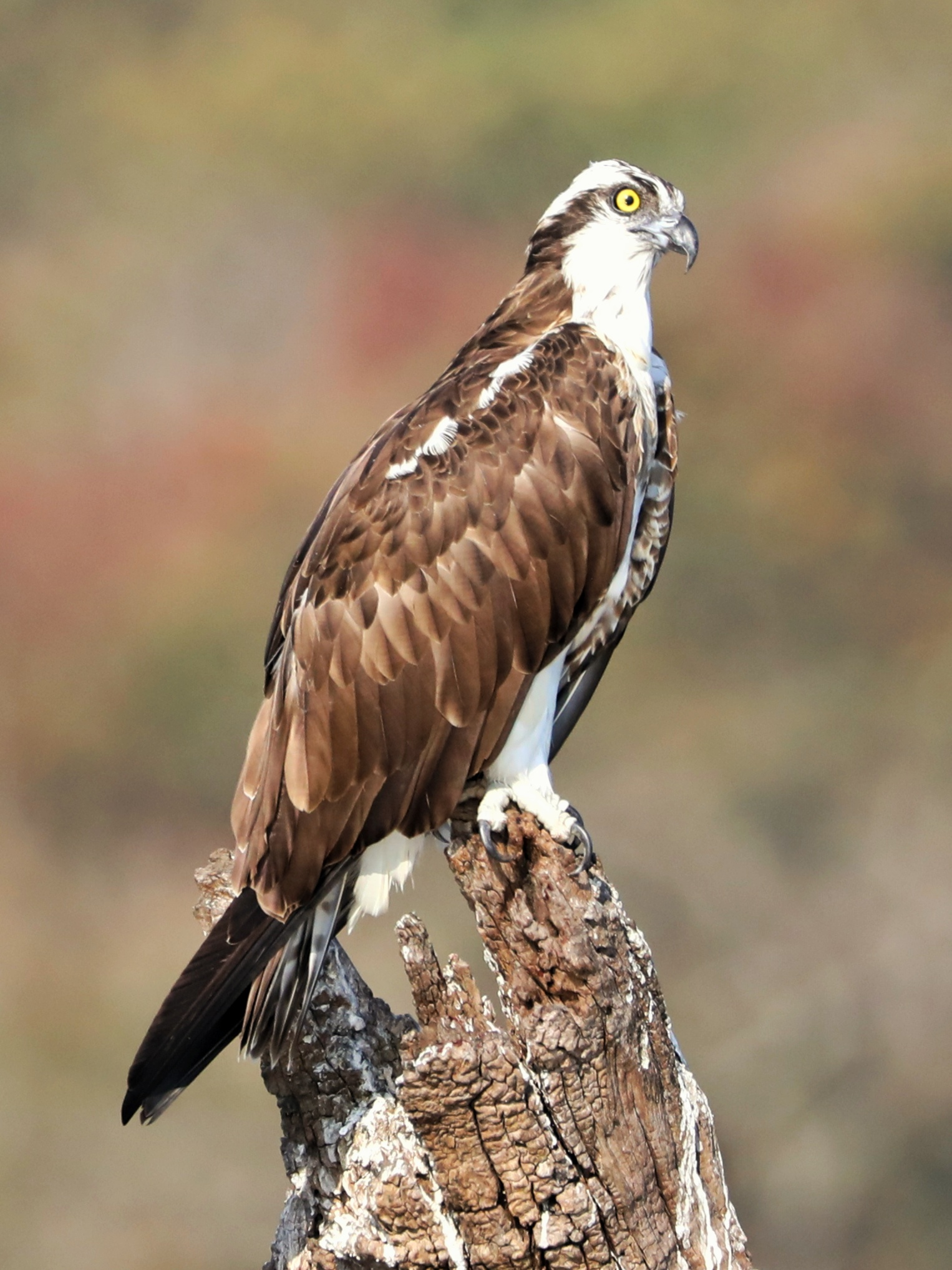
Osprey at Bhadra wildlife Sanctuary

Bhadra sanctuary has more than 300 species of birds, some endemic to this region and some migratory. Some of the species are grey junglefowl, red spurfowl, painted bush quail, emerald dove, Osprey, southern green imperial pigeon, great black woodpecker, Malabar parakeet, hill myna, ruby-throated bulbul, shama, Malabar trogon, Malabar whistling thrush, four species of hornbill and racquet-tailed drongo.

==== Butterflies ====
Some of the butterflies in Bhadra sanctuary are yamfly, baronet, crimson rose butterfly, southern birdwing, tailed jay, great orange tip, bamboo tree brown, and blue pansy.

== Threats ==
Another concern due to closeness of the population is procurement of non-timber forest products for commercial purposes and the procurement of timber for firewood. These affect the health of the forest in a long run. The other large threats are fishing and illegal poaching of wild animals.

Management practices of the forest department are habitat improvement, boundary consolidation, protection against poaching and fires, and infrastructure development. However, operating funds are insufficient and often delayed and the sanctuary management is understaffed. There are problems with frequent fires which adversely affect the habitat and biodiversity of Bhadra. Timber smuggling of valuable trees is a big problem.

Tunga-Bhadra Lift Irrigation Project promises to bring water to the rain shadow areas of Chikmagalur district by transferring water from the Tunga River to the Bhadra River.
