= Hobli =

Cluster of adjoining villages

A hobli, nad or mágani is a cluster of adjoining villages administered together for tax and land tenure purposes in the states of Karnataka India. This clustering of villages was formed mainly to streamline the collection of taxes and maintenance of land records by the revenue department of the state. Each hobli consists of several villages and several hoblis together form a taluk. Hobli are further subdivided into revenue-circles or revenue blocks known as firka or phut mágani.
