= Chikmagalur =

- City
- Chikkamagaluru
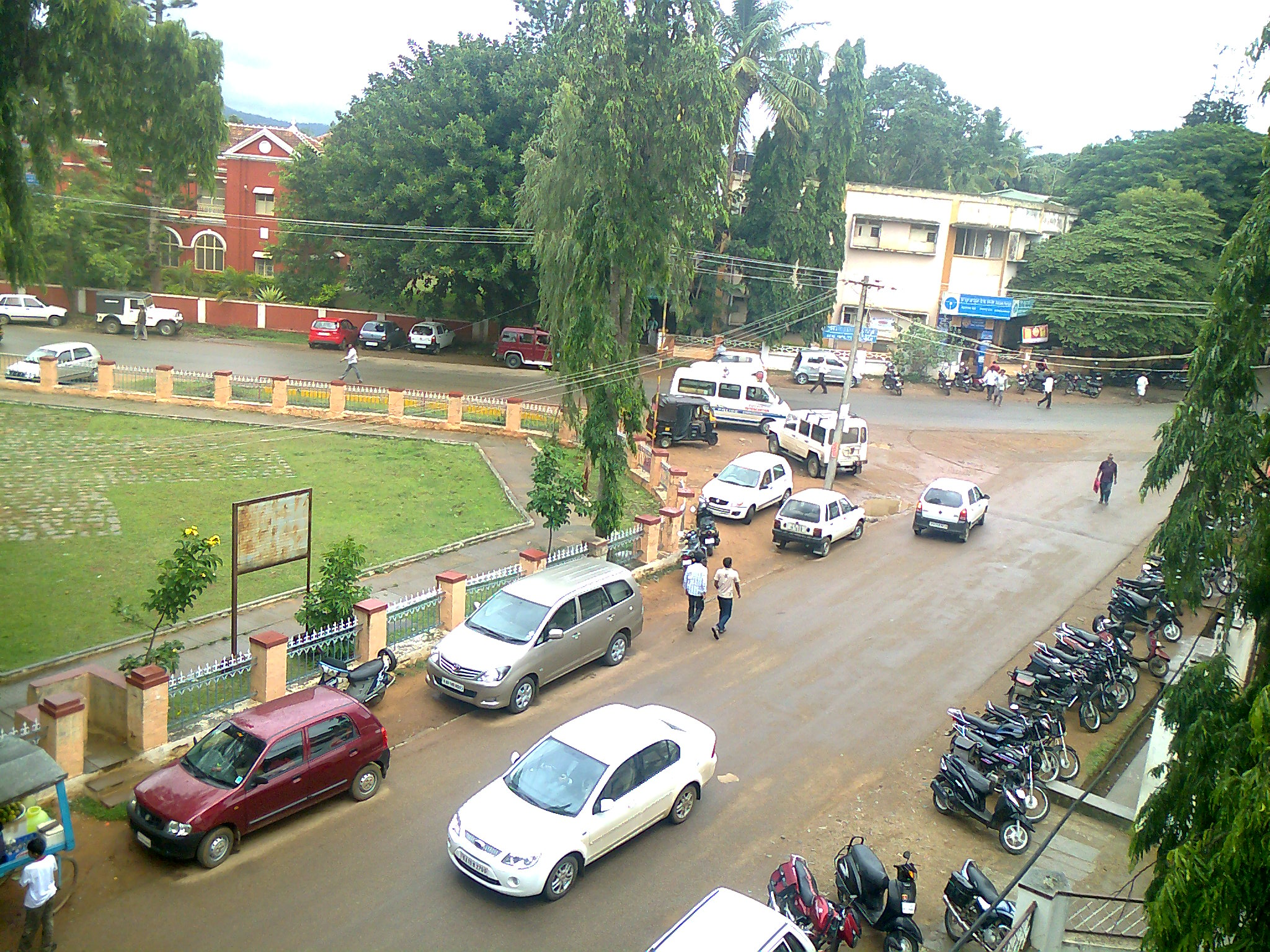
- Nickname: The Land of Coffee
- Interactive map of Chikmagalur
- Coordinates: 13.325246°N 75.792399°E
- Country: India
- State: Karnataka
- Region: Malenadu
- Founder: King Rukmangada

Government
  - Body: City Municipal Council
  - CMC Commissioner: B C Basavaraju

Area
  - City: 32.74 km^{2} (12.64 sq mi)
  - Rural: 1,581.53 km^{2} (610.63 sq mi)
- Elevation _at_bus_stand: 1,040 m (3,410 ft)

Population (2011)
  - City: 118,401
  - Density: 3,616/km^{2} (9,366/sq mi)
  - Rural: 186,967

Languages
  - Official: Kannada
- Time zone: UTC+5:30 (IST)
- PIN: 577101, 577102
- Vehicle registration: KA-18
- Website: chickamagalurcity.mrc.gov.in

Chikmagalur (officially Chikkamagaluru, IPA: [t͡ʃikːɐmɐɡɐɭuːru]), previously known as Kiriya-Muguli, is a city, taluka and the headquarters of Chikmagalur district in the Indian state of Karnataka. Located on the foothills of the Chandra Drona Mountain range of the Western Ghats, the city attracts tourists from around the world for its pleasant and favourable hill station climate, tropical rainforest and coffee estates. The pristine Baba Budangiri lies to the north of Chikmagalur, where it is believed that Baba Budan introduced coffee to India.

== Geography ==
Chikmagalur is situated in the Malenadu region of Karnataka in the Deccan Plateau, in the foothills of the Western Ghats. It is situated at an elevation of 1,090 metres (3,580 ft) above mean sea level, meaning it is the third highest city in Karnataka. The Yagachi River has its source near the town and flows in the south-easterly direction before uniting with the Hemavati river.

Chikmagalur is around 240 km from the state capital Bengaluru, 183 km from Mysore and 305 km from Hubli.

=== Climate ===
Chikmagalur generally has a moderate to cool climate. The temperature of the city varies from 11–20 °C (52–68 °F) during winter to 25–32 °C (77–90 °F) during summer.

Climate data for Chikmagalur (1991–2020, extremes 1974–2020)
Month	Jan	Feb	Mar	Apr	May	Jun	Jul	Aug	Sep	Oct	Nov	Dec	Year
Record high °C (°F)	32.5 (90.5)	35.0 (95.0)	36.7 (98.1)	37.0 (98.6)	37.0 (98.6)	35.5 (95.9)	31.0 (87.8)	30.5 (86.9)	32.0 (89.6)	32.0 (89.6)	32.5 (90.5)	32.5 (90.5)	37.0 (98.6)
Mean daily maximum °C (°F)	28.1 (82.6)	30.5 (86.9)	32.6 (90.7)	33.0 (91.4)	31.3 (88.3)	27.1 (80.8)	25.4 (77.7)	25.8 (78.4)	26.8 (80.2)	27.1 (80.8)	26.9 (80.4)	26.8 (80.2)	28.4 (83.1)
Mean daily minimum °C (°F)	14.8 (58.6)	16.0 (60.8)	18.1 (64.6)	19.5 (67.1)	19.8 (67.6)	19.3 (66.7)	19.0 (66.2)	18.8 (65.8)	18.4 (65.1)	18.1 (64.6)	17.1 (62.8)	15.2 (59.4)	17.9 (64.2)
Record low °C (°F)	10.0 (50.0)	11.1 (52.0)	14.0 (57.2)	15.0 (59.0)	14.6 (58.3)	15.0 (59.0)	15.2 (59.4)	16.0 (60.8)	14.6 (58.3)	12.0 (53.6)	11.1 (52.0)	10.9 (51.6)	10.0 (50.0)
Average rainfall mm (inches)	2.4 (0.09)	3.6 (0.14)	26.5 (1.04)	64.5 (2.54)	116.7 (4.59)	119.2 (4.69)	126.3 (4.97)	129.5 (5.10)	106.9 (4.21)	163.3 (6.43)	67.3 (2.65)	10.7 (0.42)	936.9 (36.89)
Average rainy days	0.2	0.4	1.3	4.5	7.0	9.3	11.6	9.9	7.3	8.6	3.8	1.0	64.9
Average relative humidity (%) (at 17:30 IST)	48	47	47	54	63	76	80	79	75	72	66	57	64
Source: India Meteorological Department

=== Rainfall ===
In 2022, Chikmagalur hoblis received an annual rainfall of 1,590 millimetres (63 in).

In 2024, Chikmagalur received 1,459.80 millimetres (57.472 in) of annual rainfall. It was a massive turnaround of 75% excess, following a drought-like year in 2023.

In 2025, Chikmagalur received 1,286 millimetres (50.6 in) of annual rainfall.

== Demographics ==
As of 2011 Indian Census, Chikmagalur city had a total population of 118,401, of which 58,702 were males and 59,699 were females. Population within the age group of 0 to 6 years was 11,633. The total number of literates in Chikmagalur was 96,359, which constituted 81.4% of the population with male literacy of 83.7% and female literacy of 79.1%. The effective literacy rate of 7+ population of Chikmagalur was 90.3%, of which male literacy rate was 93.1% and female literacy rate was 87.5%. The Scheduled Castes and Scheduled Tribes population was 16,423 and 1,734 respectively. Chikmagalur had 28545 households in 2011.

Languages of Chikmagalur City
1. Kannada (56.2%)
2. Urdu (23.4%)
3. Tamil (4.79%)
4. Telugu (4.50%)
5. Malayalam (2.86%)
6. Konkani (2.26%)
7. Hindi (2.13%)
8. Marathi (1.36%)
9. Tulu (1.32%)
10. Others (1.16%)

Religions in Chikmagalur city (2011)
Religion	Percent
Hinduism	69.91%
Islam	25.45%
Christianity	3.61%
Jainism	0.91%
Other or not stated	0.12%

== Tourist attractions ==
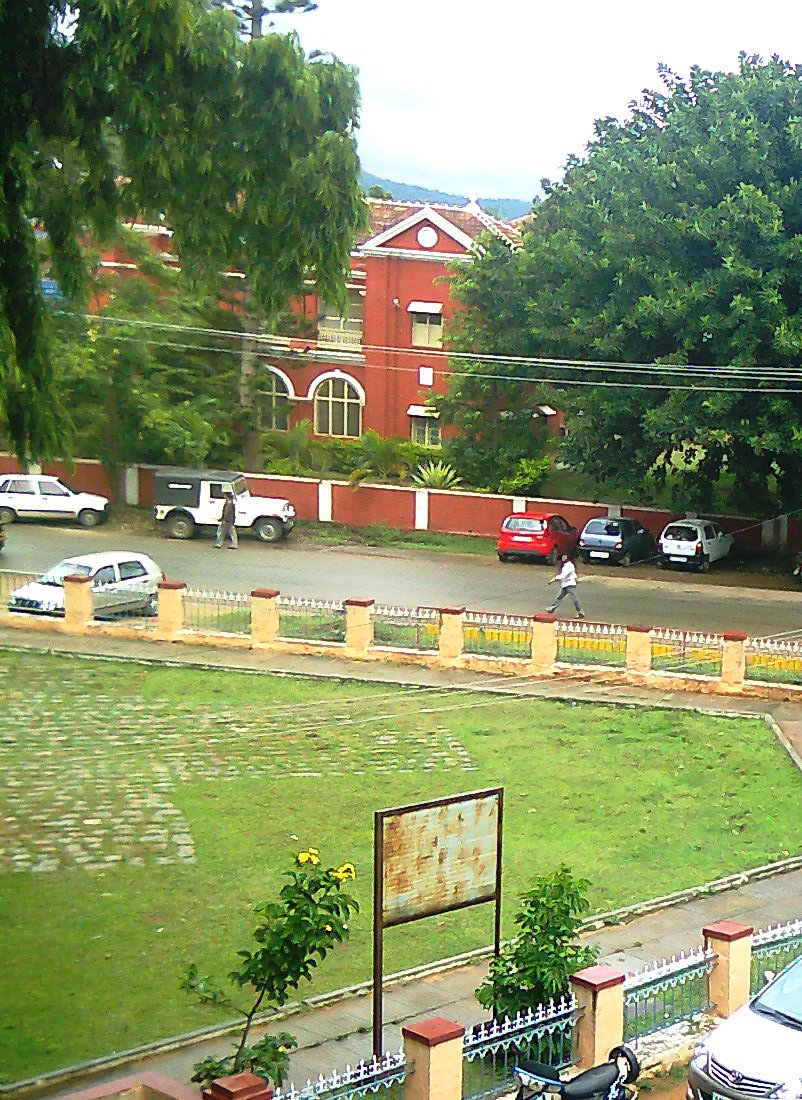
Court road in Chikmagalur

- UNESCO World Heritage sites Belur & Halebeedu Hoysala temples
- Mullayyana Giri, Baba Budangiri and its adjacent peaks along the Chandradrona Mountain Range
- Ayyanakere Lake
- Bhadra Wildlife Sanctuary
- Kudremukha National Park
- Bhadra Dam
- Horanadu and Sringeri - Pilgrim spots
- Yagati Mallikarjuna Temple

== Transport ==
Rail and road are the two modes of transportation that are available in the city. NH-173 (formerly KM Road) passes through the town connecting with the port city Mangalore, located 150 kilometres (93 mi) away. State Highway 57 (Karnataka) connects the city to Mysore via Hassan in the south and to Shimoga(via Lingadahalli), in the north. A part of SH-57 south of Chikmagalur has been upgraded to NH-373 upto Bilikere, but major construction project awaits.

A railway line connects Chikmagalur railway station to Kadur Junction railway station. The nearest international airport is Mangalore International Airport.

Karnataka State Road Transport Corporation provides inter-state, inter-city and intra-city bus services to the city. Chikmagalur division of KSRTC has six operational depots, including three in Hassan district. NWKRTC and KKRTC buses travelling to the pilgrimage town of Dharmasthala, all pass through the Charmadi Ghat (NH-373), thus giving the city very good connectivity with the cities of northern Karnataka, like Hubli, Ballari, Bijapur, Kalaburagi, etc.
