= Agasavalli =

- village
- Location in Karnataka, India Agasavalli (India)
- Coordinates: 13.400608°N 75.220959°E
- Country: India
- State: Karnataka
- District: Sringeri
- Talukas: Sringeri

Government
  - Body: Village Panchayat

Languages
  - Official: Kannada
- Time zone: UTC+5:30 (IST)
- Nearest city: Sringeri
- Civic agency: Village Panchayat

Agasavalli is a village in the southern state of Karnataka, India. It is located in the Sringeri taluk of Chikkamagaluru district in Karnataka.

== See also ==
- Chikkamagaluru
- Districts of Karnataka
