= Vidyaranyapura Agrahara, Sringeri =

Vidyaranyapura Agrahara
- village
- Interactive map of Vidyaranyapura Agrahara
- Coordinates: 13.405°N 75.252°E
- Country: India
- State: Karnataka
- District: Chikkamagaluru

Languages
  - Official: Kannada
- Time zone: UTC+5:30 (IST)
- Postal code: 577139

Vidyaranyapura Agrahara is a small village near Sringeri in the state of Karnataka, India. It houses several brahmin families associated with the Sringeri Sharada Peetham and local temples.

== History ==
Twenty-five Brahmin families have lived in Vidyaranyapura Agrahara for tens of centuries, since the time of Sri Adi Shankara who founded the Sringeri Sharada Peetham and other mathas (mutts) in India. One such vaidik brahmin named V. Rammurti Shrouti, disciple of the present Shankaracharya, lives at Jaydatta Kuteera in Vidyaranyapura and teaches Samveda.

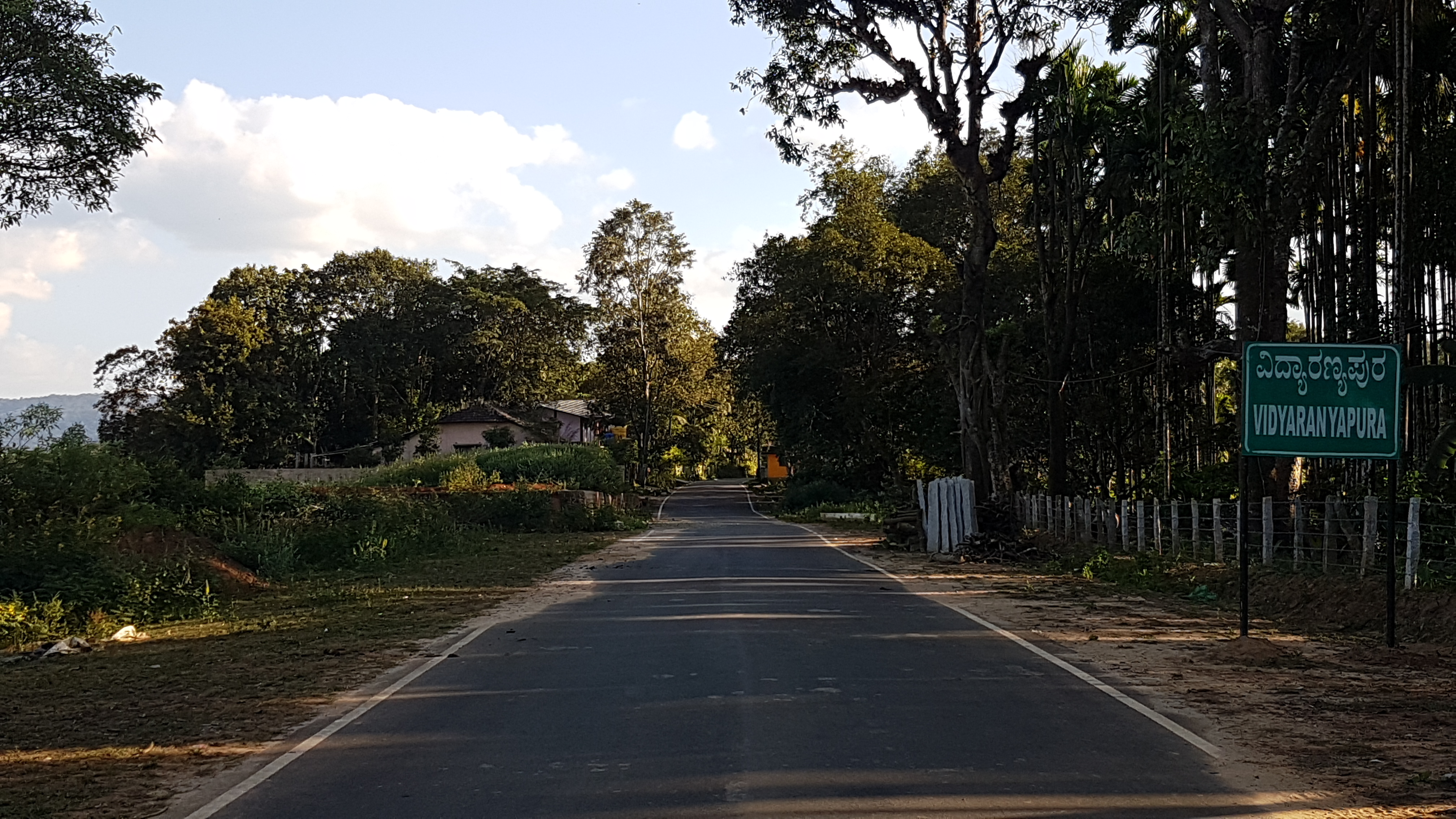
Vidyaranyapura Agrahara approach road from Sringeri

== Location ==
Vidyaranyapura is located about 2 km from Sringeri bus stand and about 1.5 km from Sri Sharadamba Temple. Its approach road starts from the Harihara street that connects the bus stand and temple. The approach road was converted to concrete, making it more easily accessible even in monsoon season. The village is on the banks of Tunga river, on the opposite side of Narasimha Vana that houses Sringeri Sharada Peetham.

== Temples ==
The Chaturmurti Vidyeshwara temple is located in a hamlet called Simhagiri, off the approach road to Vidyaranyapura. As the name suggests, it combines four murties (idols). The front idol is that of Sri Vidyatirtha, flanked by his two chief disciples Sri Bharati Tirtha and Sri Vidyaranya. The other three idols are of Brahma, Vishnu and Maheshwara (Shiva). These are topped by Sri Lakshmi Narasimha, which in turn is topped by a Shiva Linga. The agrahara has few small temples next to the main road, dedicated to Sri Rama, Sri Kalikamba, Sri Adi Shankaracharya and Sri Vidyaranya, after who the village is named. From Vidyaranyapura, a path toward east through paddy fields leads to Sri Narasimha Swamy temple. Another winding road toward the west leads to the temple of Sri Vana Durga, one of the four guardian deities of Sringeri.

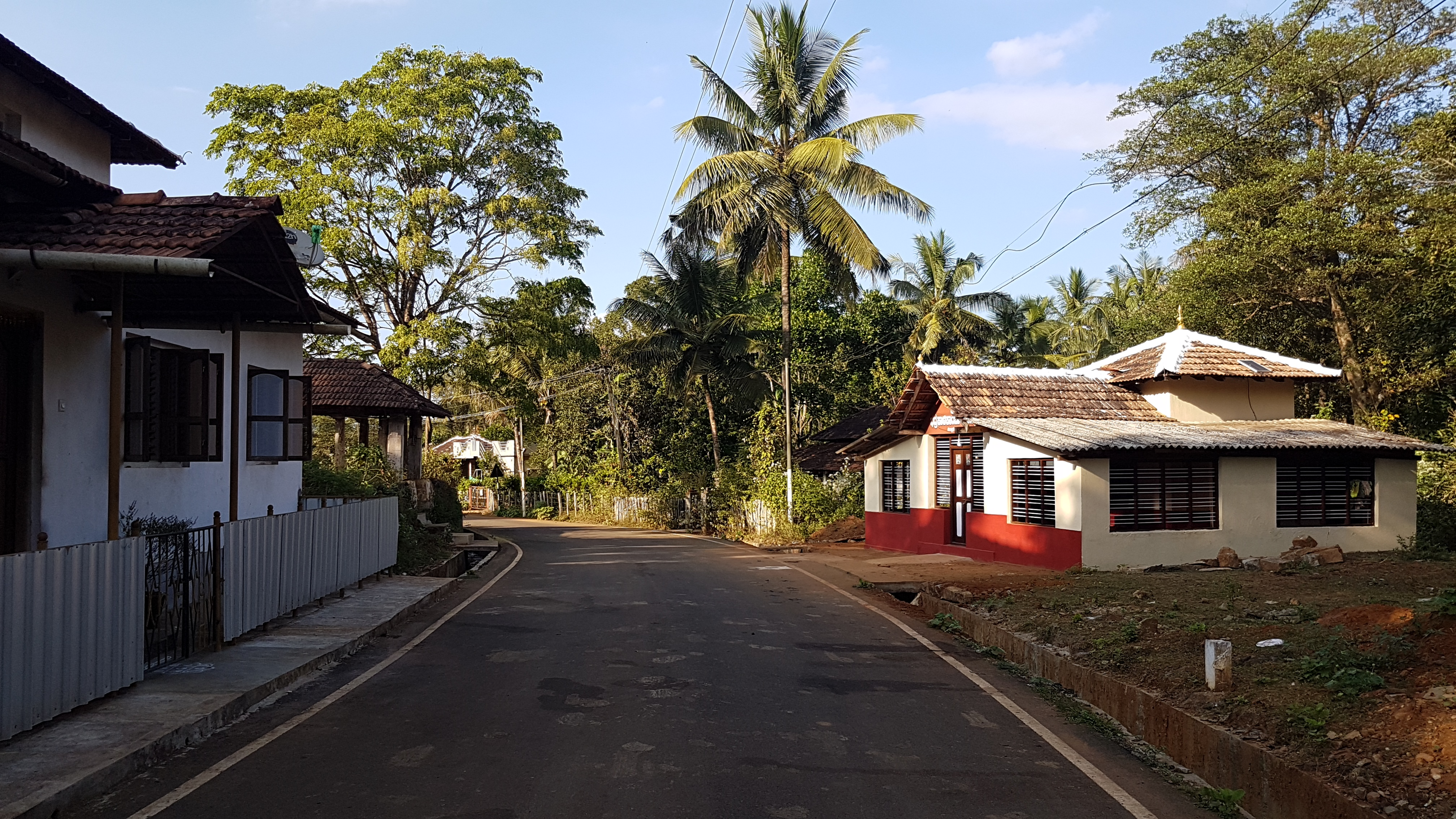
Sri Kalikamba temple and main street, Vidyaranyapura Agrahara

== See also ==
- Sringeri
- Sri Sharadamba Temple
- Sringeri Sharada Peetham
