= Addagadde =

- village
- Location in Karnataka, India Addagadde (India)
- Coordinates: 13.4624171°N 75.286773°E
- Country: India
- State: Karnataka
- District: Chikkamagaluru
- Talukas: Sringeri

Government
  - Body: Village Panchayat

Population (2001)
  - Total: 800

Languages
  - Official: Kannada
- Time zone: UTC+5:30 (IST)
- PIN: 577126
- Telephone code: 08265
- Nearest city: Chikmagalur
- Civic agency: Village Panchayat

Addagadde is a village on the banks of river Tunga in the southern state of Karnataka, India. It is located in Sringeri taluk of Chikkamagaluru district at a distance of 8 km away from Sringeri, on Sringeri to Shivamogga highway. It is a panchayat village, filled with plenty of greenery and a classic example of a Malnad village set up. The village has a population of around 1500, where majority depends on arecanut cultivation. Addagadde has a historical Veerabhadreshwara temple.

== See also ==
- Chikmagalur
- Districts of Karnataka
