= Kudremukha =

Mountain in Karnataka, India

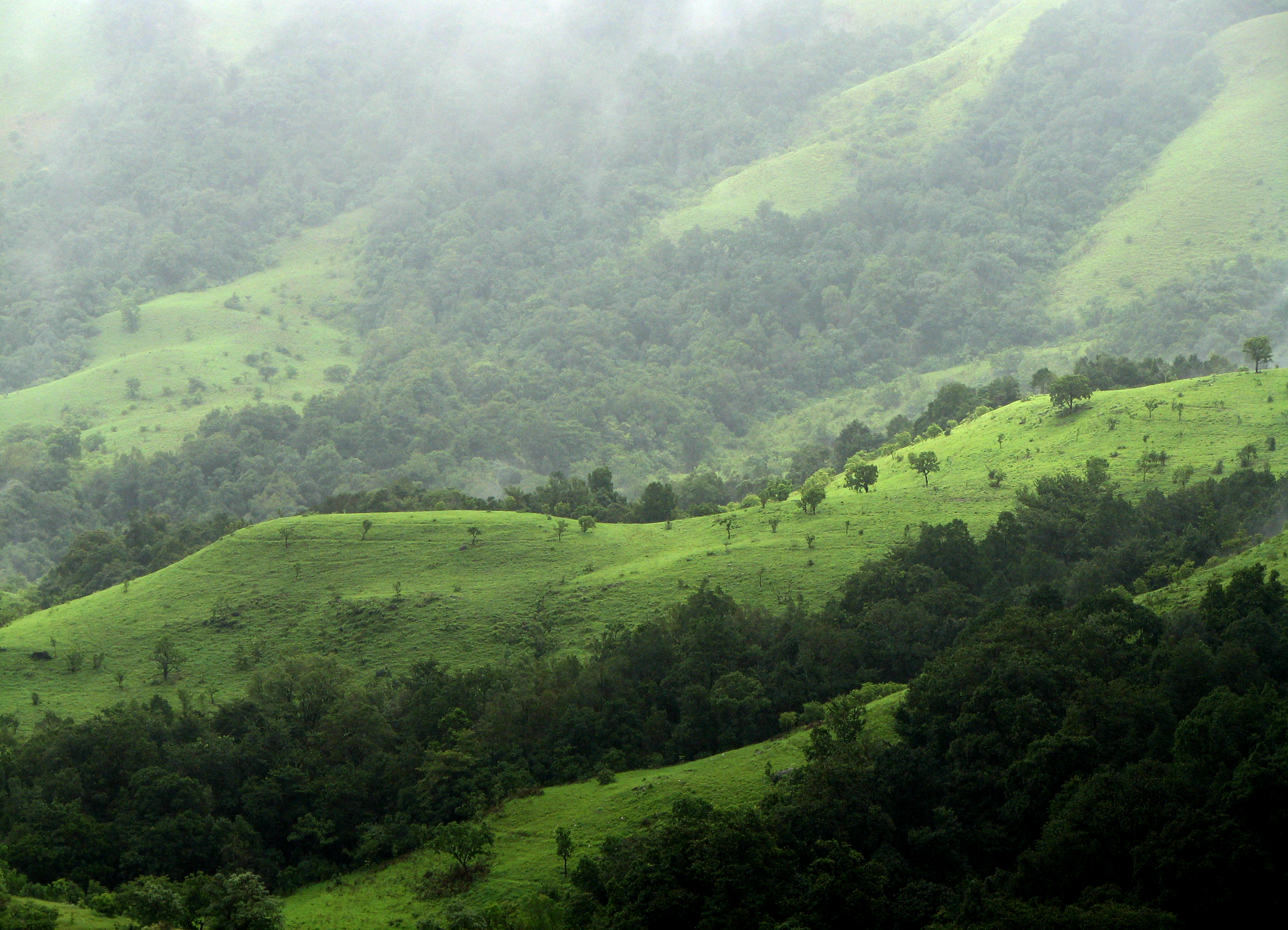
- Kudremukh National Park from top

Highest point
- Elevation: 1,894 m (6,214 ft)above MSL
- Prominence: 1,052 m (3,451 ft)
- Listing: Ribu
- Coordinates: 13°07′46.24″N 75°16′06.79″E

Naming
- Etymology: Horse Face
- Language of name: Kannada

Geography
- Location within Karnataka Location within India
- Location: Kalasa Taluk, Chikmagalur district, Karnataka, India
- Parent range: Western Ghats

Climbing
- Easiest route: Hike

Kudremukha is the name of a mountain range and an individual mountain peak located in Chikmagalur district, in Karnataka, India. It is also the name of a small hill station and iron ore-mining town situated near the mountain, about 20 kilometres from Kalasa in Kalasa Taluk. The name Kuduremukha literally means "horse-faced" in Kannada and refers to a particular picturesque view of a side of the mountain that resembles a horse's face. It was also referred to as 'Samseparvata', historically since it was approached from Samse village. Kuduremukha is Karnataka's 2nd highest peak after Mullayanagiri and 26th highest peak in western ghats. The nearest International Airport is at Mangalore which is at a distance of 99 kilometres.

The Kudremukha National Park in the Western Ghats is a part of the world's 38 ‘hottest hotspots’ of biological diversity, a UNESCO World Heritage Site.

== Location ==
The Kudremukha National Park (latitude 13°01'00" to 13°29'17" N, longitude 75°00'55' to 75°25'00" E) is the second-largest Wildlife Protected Area (600.32 km^{2}) belonging to a tropical wet evergreen type of forest in the Western Ghats. Kudremukha National Park is located at the tri-junction of Dakshina Kannada, Udupi District, and Chikmagalur district of Karnataka. The Western Ghats is one of the thirty-four hotspots identified for biodiversity conservation in the world. Kudremukha National Park comes under the Global Tiger Conservation Priority-I, under the format developed jointly by the Wildlife Conservation Society (WCS) and World Wide Fund-USA.

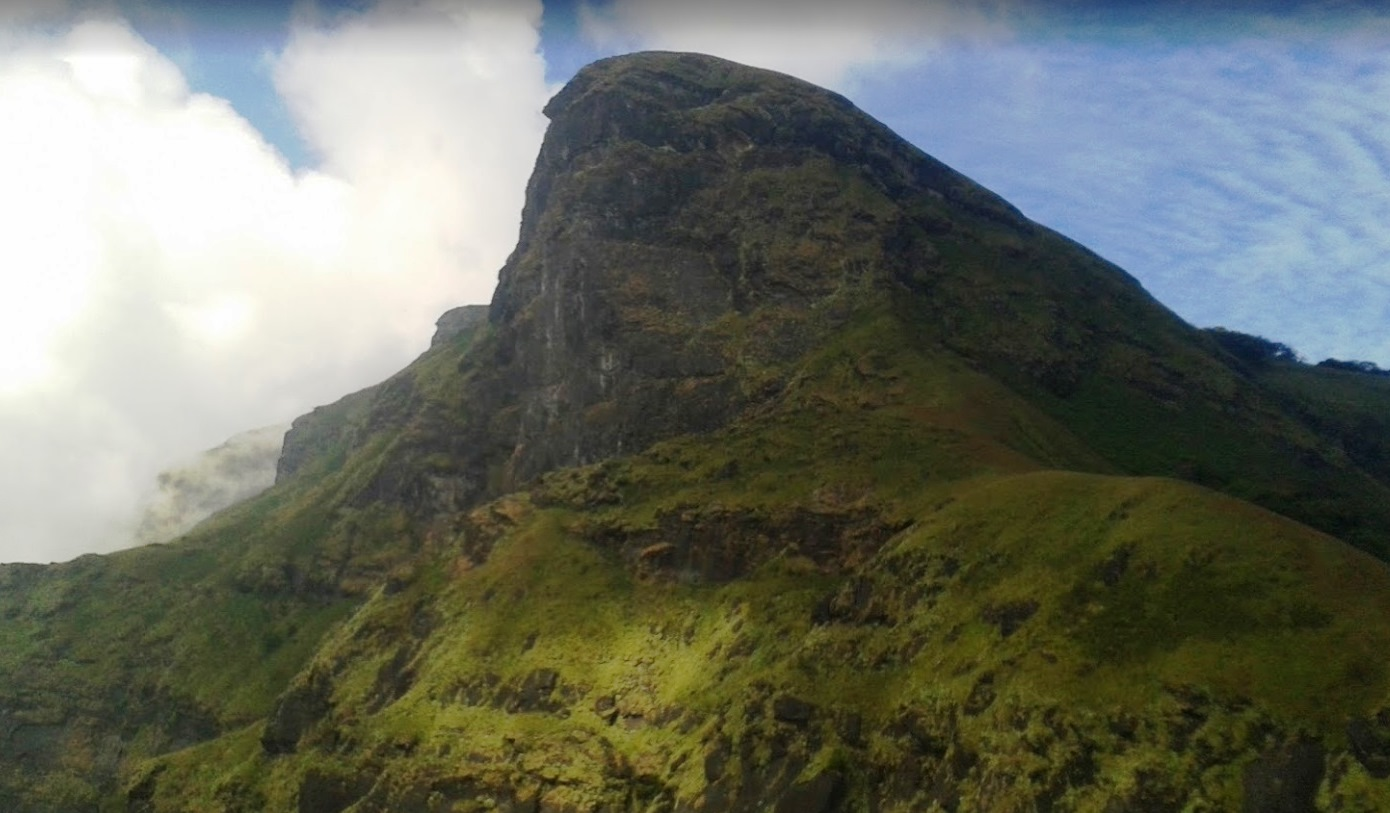

== Geography ==
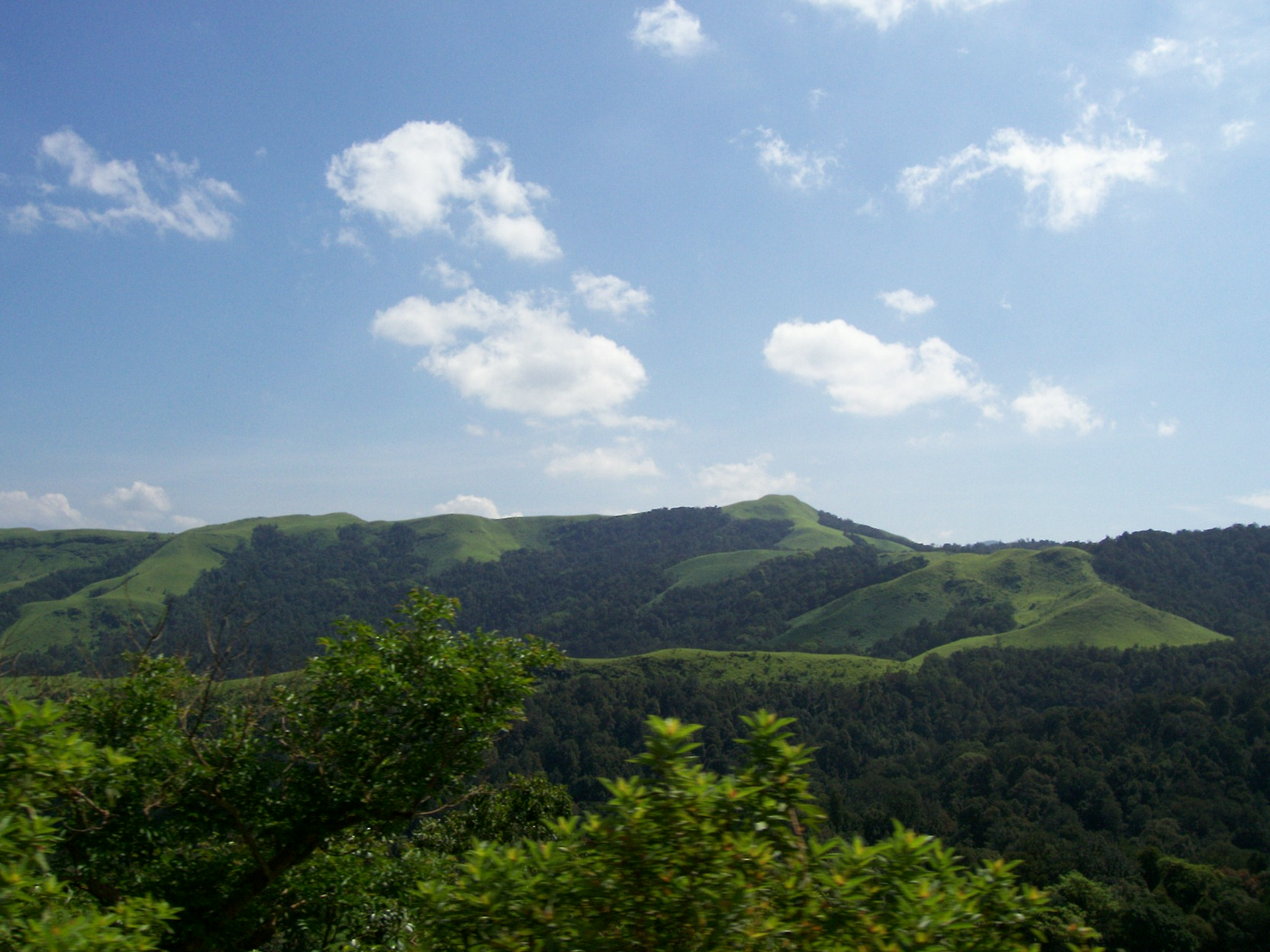
Panoramic View of mountains in the Kudremukha National Park

The town of Kudremukha (KIOCL & etc.) lies at an elevation of around 815 metres (2,674 ft), whereas the peak stands at 1,894 metres (6,214 ft). The southern and western sides of the park form the steep slope of the Western Ghats ridgeline, with the altitude varying from 100 m - 1892 m (peak). The northern, central, and eastern portions of the park constitute a chain of rolling hills with a mosaic of natural grassland and shola forests. Kudremukha receives an average annual rainfall of 7000 mm, largely due to the forest types of mainly evergreen vegetation that can be found here.

== History ==
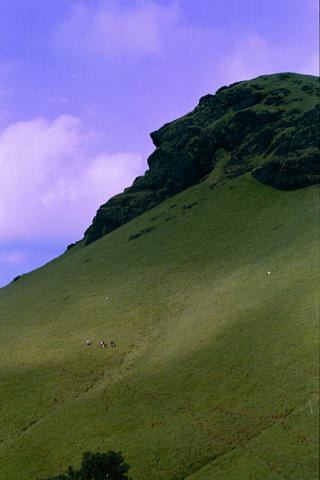
The Horse Faced Peak

=== Opposition to national park ===
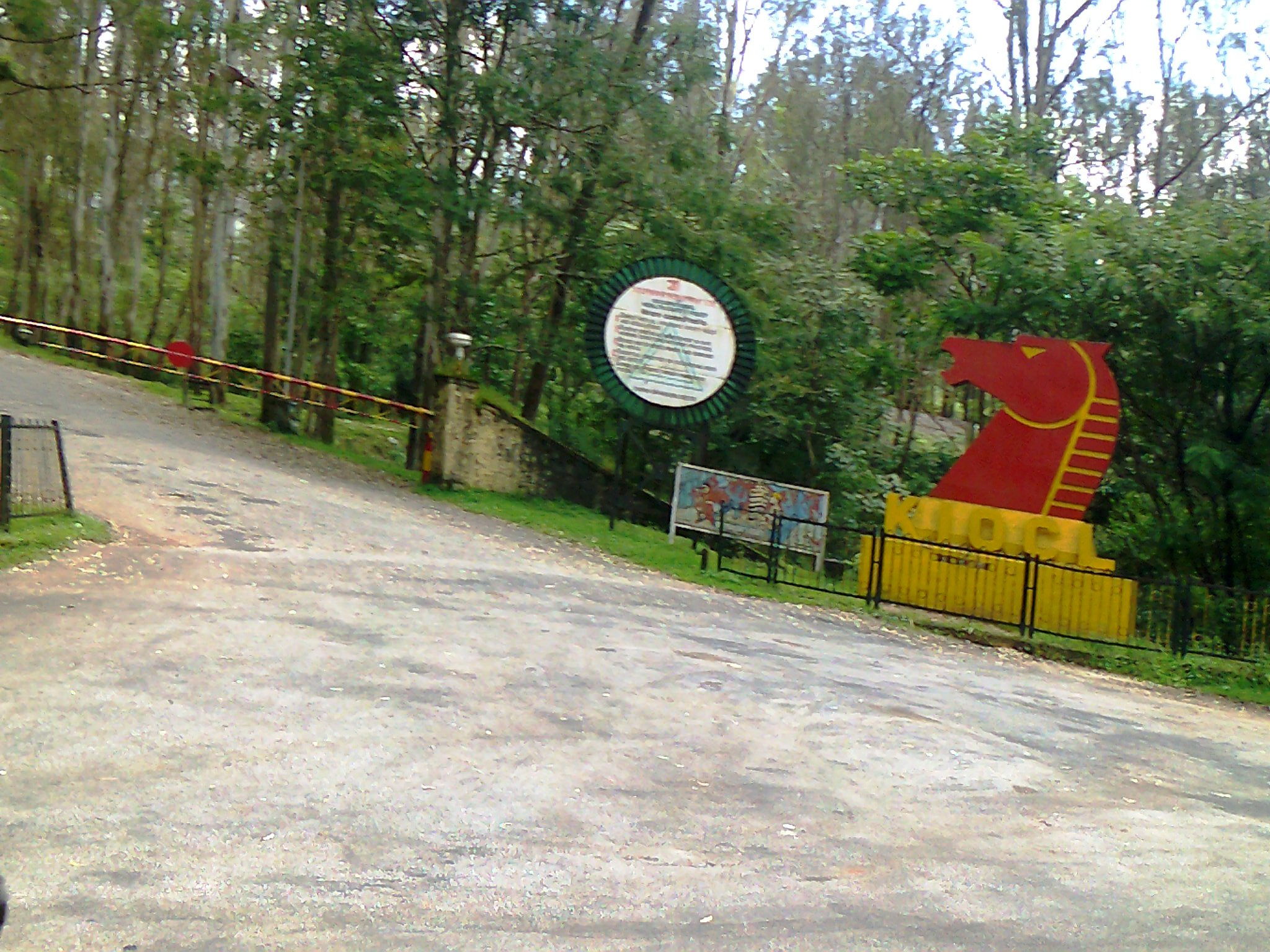
Kudremukh

People residing inside the national park did not welcome the idea of such a concept, as it involves eviction and Kudremukha Rashtriya Udyana Virodhi Okoota, an NGO, fights on behalf of people residing inside the forest and opposes the formation of the national park. To curb the supposed Naxalite activity inside the premises, police opened fire on activists and killed five suspected Naxalites on 10 July 2007.

=== Conservation ===
After years of campaigning by environmentalists, Kudremukha was declared a National Park in 1987

=== Ecology ===
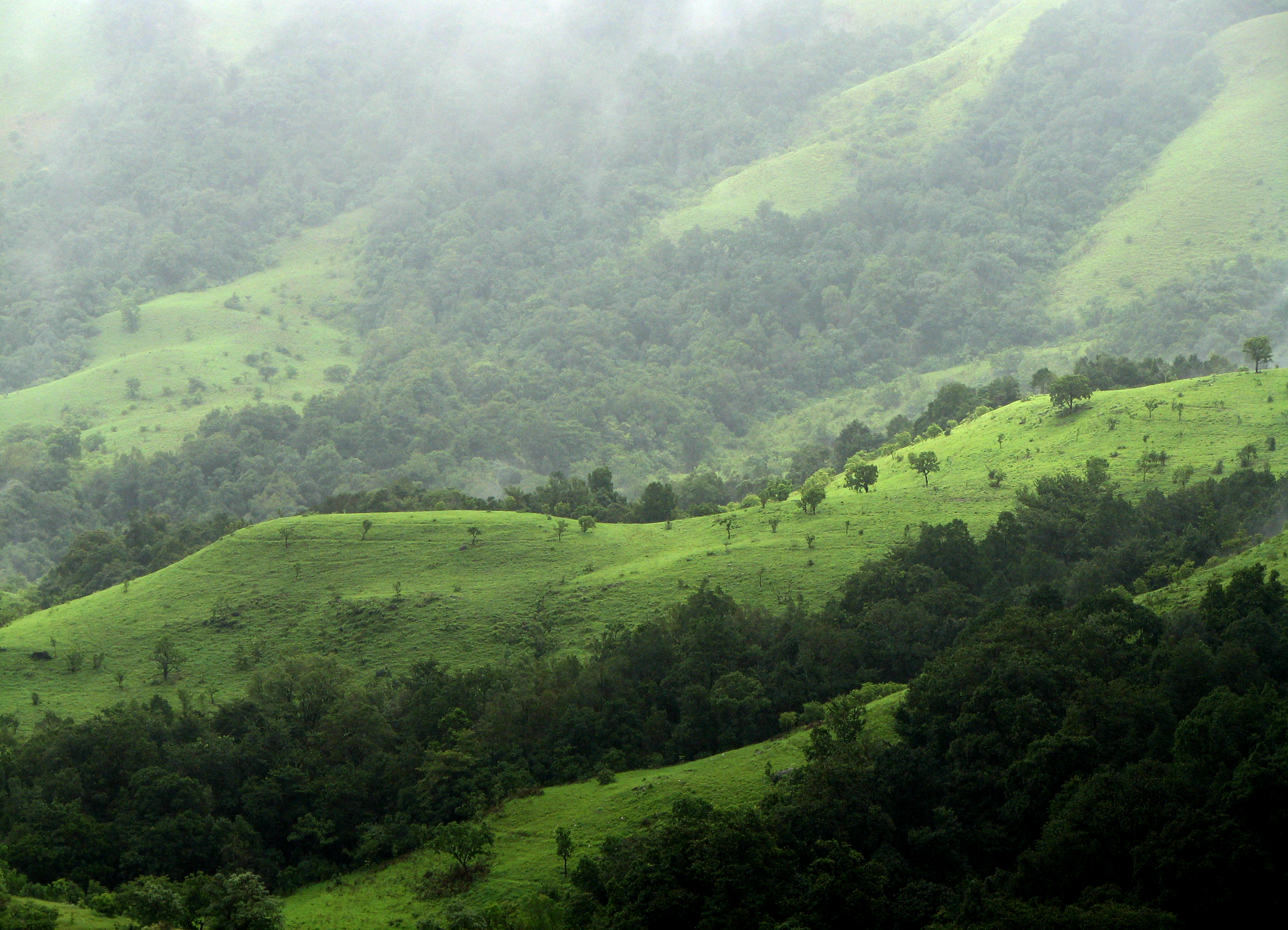
Shola Grasslands and forests in the Kudremukha National Park, Western Ghats, Karnataka.

A diverse assemblage of endangered large mammals is found in the park supporting three large mammal predator species such as the tiger, leopard and wild dog. The important tiger prey base found within the park is gaur, sambar, wild pig, muntjac, chevrotain, bonnet macaque, common langur and the lion-tailed macaque.

The wet climate and the tremendous water retentive capacity of the shola grasslands and forests have led to the formation of thousands of perennial streams in the region converging to form three major rivers of the region, Tunga, Bhadra and Nethravathi which form an important lifeline for the people of Karnataka and Andhra Pradesh. Lobo's house is an old abandoned farm on the upper reaches of Kuduremukha.

== Trekking in Kudremukha ==
There are numerous peaks inside the National Park, each offering a mesmerizing view of the evergreen forest and the western escarpments. Notable ones are as follows:

- Tirimarigubbe
- Soojigallu
- Bangarabailge
- Hirimariguppe (popularly known as The Netravathi Peak)
- Elneer waterfalls

But trekking is restricted to Kudremukha & Netravathi by the Forest department.

=== Kudremukha Peak ===
Difficulty level	Moderate to difficult
Approximate temperature	3–27 °C (37–81 °F)
Accommodation type	Easily available: a) Be noted its a place a forest area, no restrooms are available, once you cross forest check post. b) Dormitories: Ideally big room where people sleep in sleeping bags. There will be separate rooms for men and women. c) Several Home stays, with options for private rooms also.
Washrooms	a) Toilets at Base Camp Kudremukha. b) Several Homestays.
Distance from Bangalore	320 km (200 mi) (one way)
Total trekking distance	Approximately 20–22 km (12–14 mi)
Attraction	Beautiful landscape

== Mining town ==
Kudremukha Malleshwara
- Village
- Location within Karnataka
- Country: India
- State: Karnataka
- District: Chikmagalur district
- Taluk: Kalasa
- Established: 2nd April, 1976
- Founder: Government of India
- Named for: Horse-face shaped Hill

Government
  - Body: NAC

Area
  - Total: 45.43 km^{2} (17.54 sq mi)
- Elevation: 820 m (2,690 ft)

Population (2011)
  - Total: 2,241
  - Density: 49.33/km^{2} (127.8/sq mi)

Languages
  - Official: Kannada
- Time zone: UTC+5:30 (IST)
- PIN: 577142
- Vehicle registration: KA-18
- Website: http://www.kioclltd.in/lang=EN

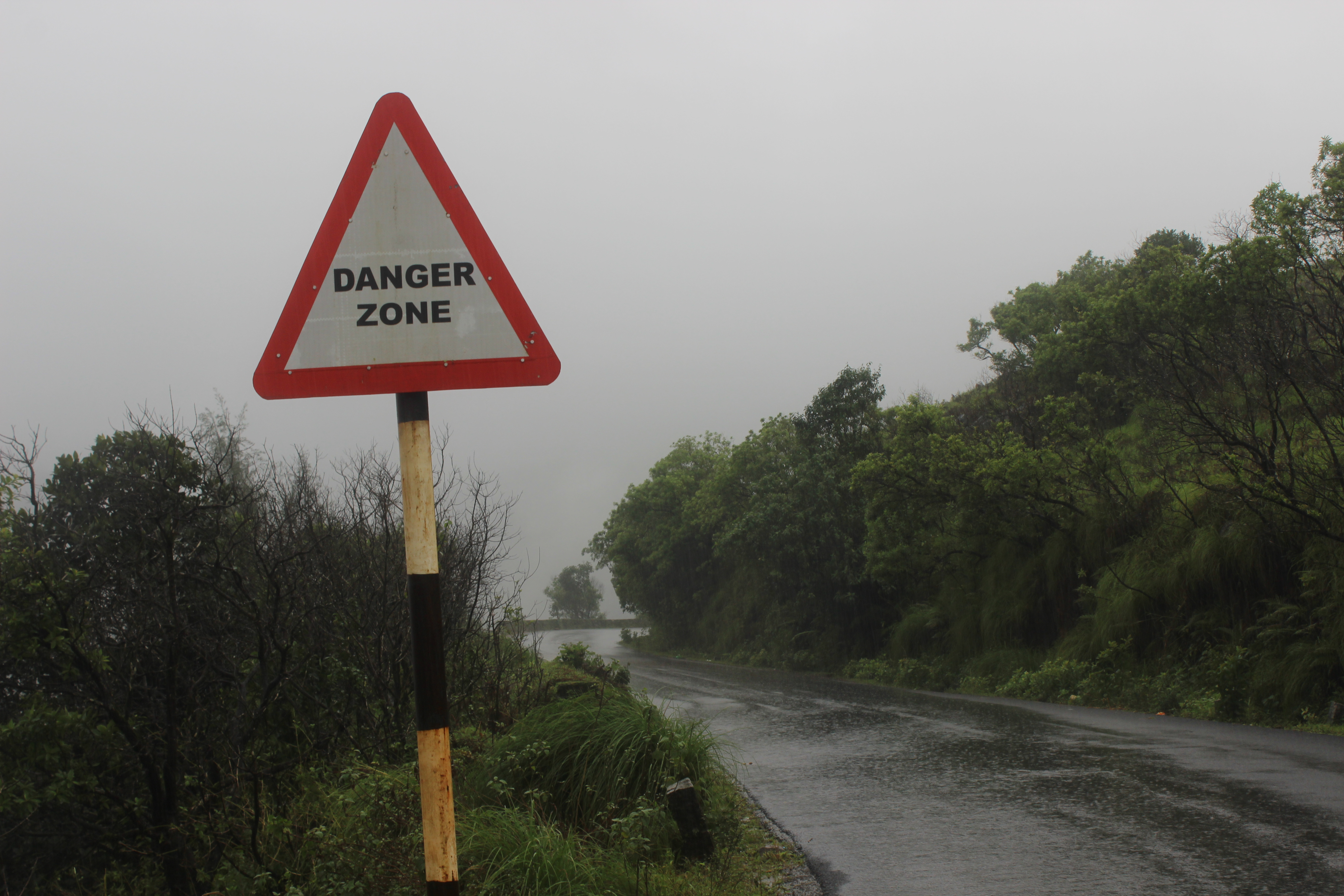
Kudremukha Road

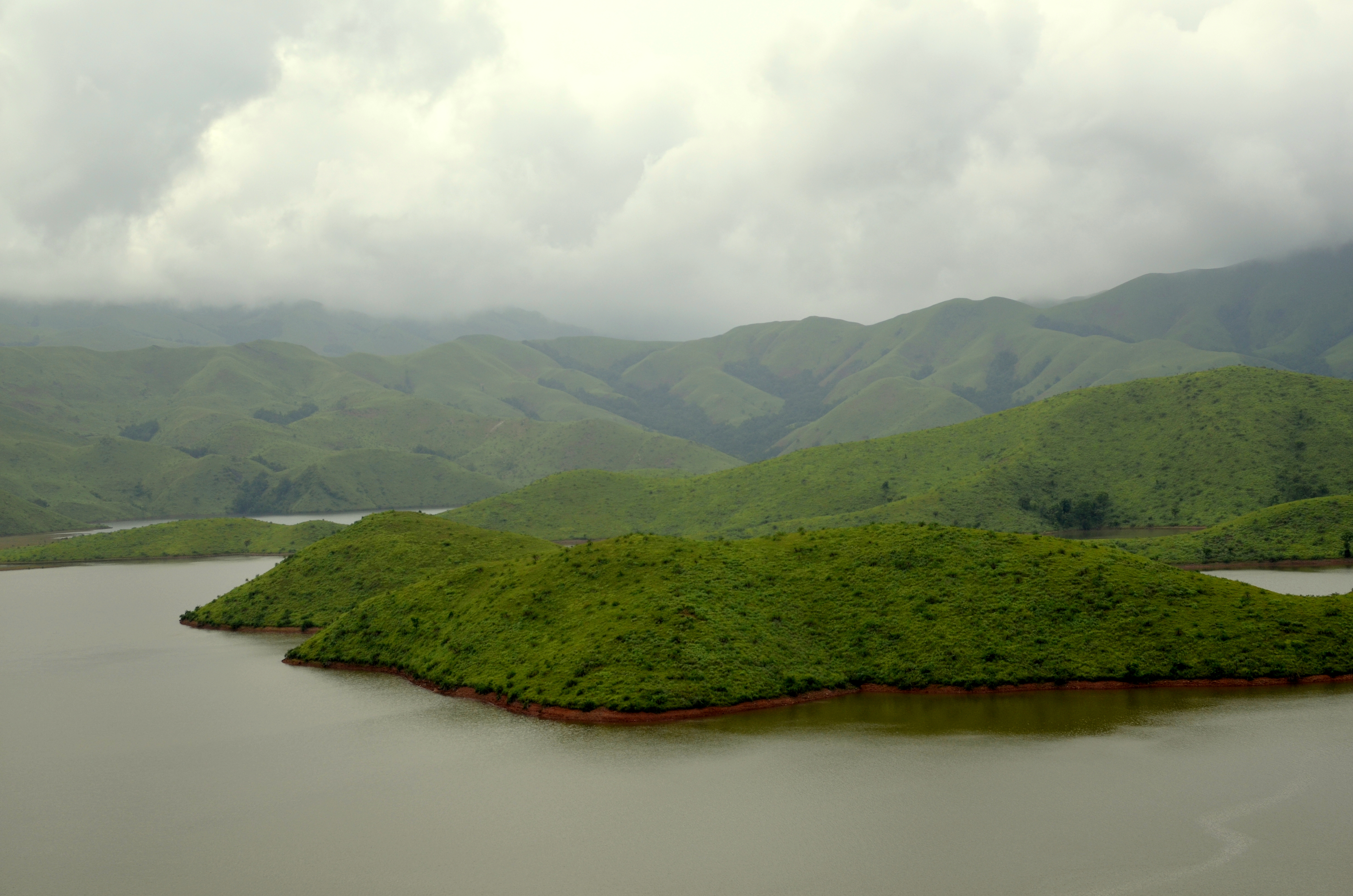
Lakya dam lake near Kudremukha town

The Kudremukha township developed primarily as an iron ore mining town where the government ran Kudremukha Iron Ore Company Ltd. (KIOCL). This public sector company operated for almost 30 years but was closed in 2006 due to environmental issues. The company proposed eco-tourism in the area and insisted that the land lease be renewed for 99 years. However, environmentalists opposed such an idea because the area should be given time to regenerate completely rest. Thus, the mining lease lapsed on 24 July 1999. The mining town now known as Kudremukha originally known as Malleshwara village whose residents have relocated to Jamble village of Kalasa taluk in the 1970s. Mining town had 3 schools named Giri Jyothi Convent School, Kendriya Vidyalaya (KV Kudremukh) & Government school, which had an education from Nursery to class 12.

=== Demographics ===
As of 2001 India census, Kudremukha town had a population of 8095. Males constitute 54% of the population, while females constitute 46%. Kudremukha has an average literacy rate of 80%, which is higher than the national average of 59.5%; male literacy is 83% while female literacy is 77%. 11% of the population is under six years of age.

Due to closure of mining activity, the population fell drastically. As per 2011 census, the Kudremukha Notified Area Council (NAC) which spans 45.43 square kilometres (17.54 mi^{2}) had a population of just 2,241 with 719 households.

== Threats ==
Kudremukha Iron Ore Company logo

Kudremukha Iron Ore Company Limited (KIOCL) is a public sector company that was mining iron ore from the Kudremukha hills. KIOCL conducted its operations in an area of 4,604.55 ha for over 20 years. Opposition to its activities built up over the years from environmentalists and wildlife conservationists who were concerned about the threat to the region's flora and fauna, and farmers who were affected by the pollution of the streams that originated in the mining area. KIOCL has been banned from operating in this beautiful Natural Reserve, according to a Supreme Court order.

The rainfall in Kudremukh, which is one of the highest for any open cast mining operation in the world, greatly accentuates the impacts of siltation as claimed by environmentalists. The topographic and rainfall characteristics in combination with the open cast mining of low-grade iron ore and other land-surface disturbances caused by the KIOCL operations resulted in very high sediment discharge, with over 60% of the total siltation in the Bhadra system being contributed by the mining area which forms less than six per cent of the catchment. With high-quality practices adopted by KIOCL to mine, the flora and fauna remained intact, causing no adverse effects on nature.

KIOCL used to send iron ore through pipes running through districts of Udupi and Dakshina Kannada and converted to pellets at their plant in Panambur.

=== Lakhya Dam ===
The dam is built across Lakhya hole(stream), a tributary of Bhadra River. Construction of this earthen dam was completed in the year 1994. It is operated by KIOCL. It was built as a tailing pond, that is, to dump the unwanted gangue materials from the extracted iron ore. The dam has a Gross Storage Capacity of 273,790,000 cubic metres (9.669×10^{9} ft^{3}) (9.66Tmcft).

Besides using this reservoir as a tailing, during odd years, water from this dam is used to compensate for deficit drinking water supply to Mangaluru city, and also to the dependents of Tungabhadra basin.

== See also ==
- Baba Budangiri
- Chikmagalur
- Hanumangundi Falls
- Kalasa
- Karkala
- Kemmanagundi
- Mangalore
- Mullayangiri
