= Machikoppa =

Machikoppa Machi Koppa
- village
- Location in Karnataka, India Machikoppa (India)
- Coordinates: 13.465423°N 75.363121°E
- Country: India
- State: Karnataka
- District: Chikkamagaluru

Government
  - Type: Panchayati raj (India)
  - Body: Gram panchayat

Languages
  - Official: Kannada
- Time zone: UTC+5:30 (IST)
- ISO 3166 code: IN-KA
- Vehicle registration: KA
- Website: karnataka.gov.in

Machikoppa is a small village in Chikkamagaluru District, Karnataka, South India.
