= Mullayyanagiri =

Highest mountain in the Indian state of Karnataka

Mullayanagiri
- Melgadduge
- Location within Karnataka

Highest point
- Elevation: 1,925 metres (6,316 ft)
- Prominence: 1,154 metres (3,786 ft)
- Isolation: 188.62 kilometres (117.20 mi)
- Listing: List of Indian states and territories by highest point, Ribu
- Coordinates: 13°23′27.5″N 75°43′17″E

Geography
- Location: Chikkamagaluru taluk, Chikkamagaluru district, Karnataka, India
- Parent range: Baba Budan Giri Range

Mullayyanagiri is the highest peak in Karnataka, India. Mullayyanagiri is located in the Chandra Dhrona Hill Ranges of the Western Ghats of Chikkamagaluru Taluk. With a height of 1,925 metres (6,316 ft), it is the highest peak in Karnataka and also the 23rd highest peak in Western Ghats. The summit of Mullayanagiri has a small temple and houses a police radio relay station. Seethalayyanagiri is a prominent peak which is adjacent to this place.

== Temple ==
The peak gets its name from a small temple (gadduge/tomb) at the summit, which is dedicated to a sage "Mullappa swamy" who is believed to have meditated at the caves only a couple of feet below the summit. The caves are accessible and not very deep, they have a direct entrance to the garbagudi of the temple, which is now blocked by the temple priests. Apart from multiple versions of folklore and strong Siddha culture around the belt, the origins or any information about the deity remains ambiguous.

== Trekking ==
Previously, when the present asphalt roads and the 464 stone and concrete steps were not present, a trail was used to reach the peak, known as 'Sarpadari' or 'Sarpanadi'. Although it is not very frequently visited now, this trail is cherished by trekkers.

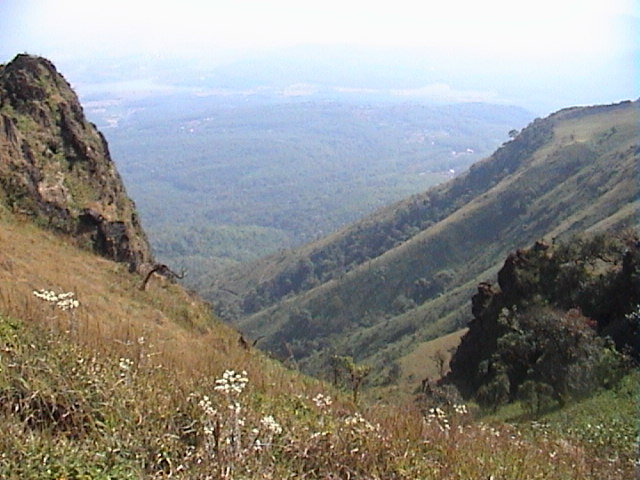
On the way to Mullayanagiri

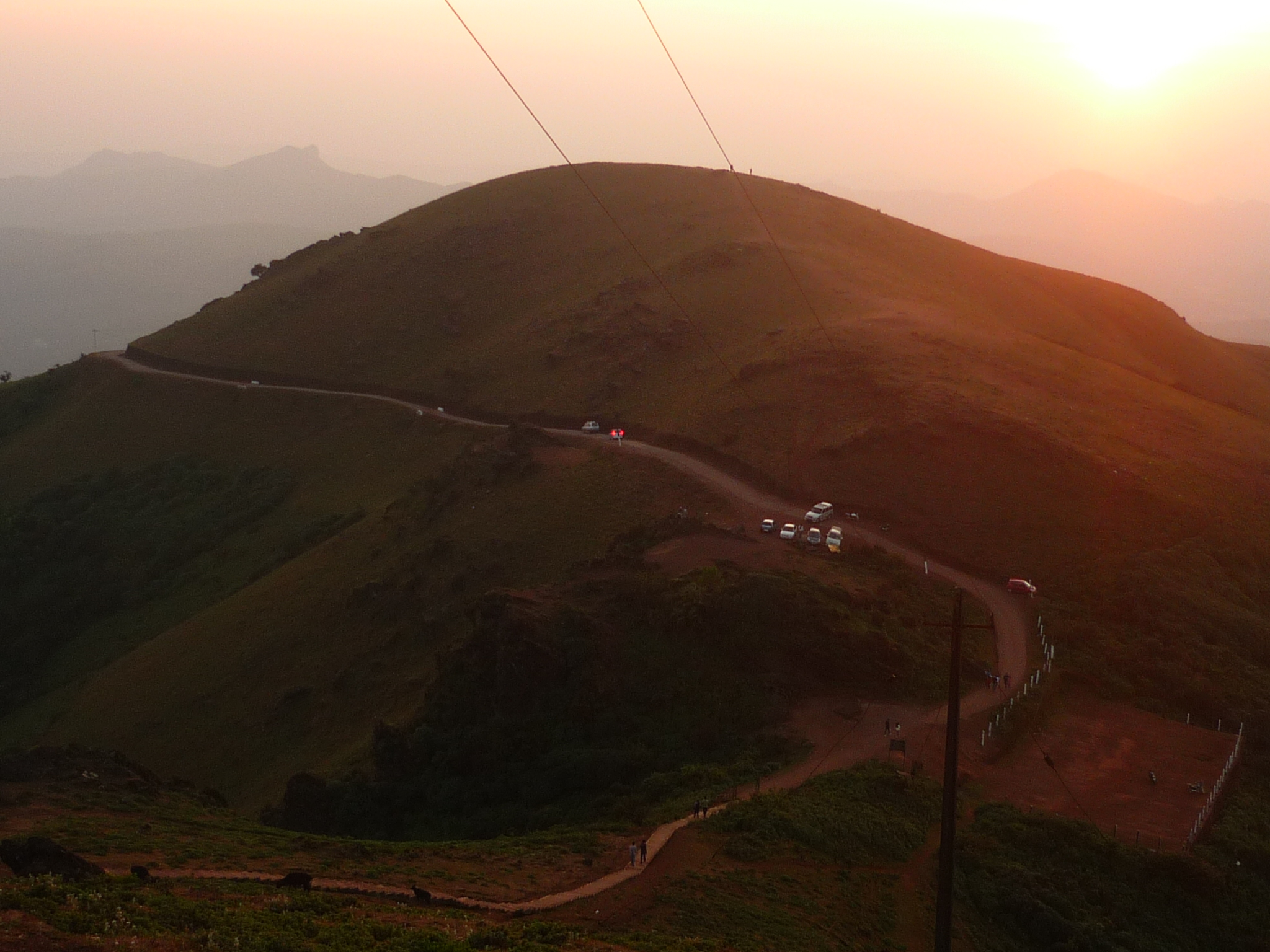
Sunset from Mullaiyangiri hills

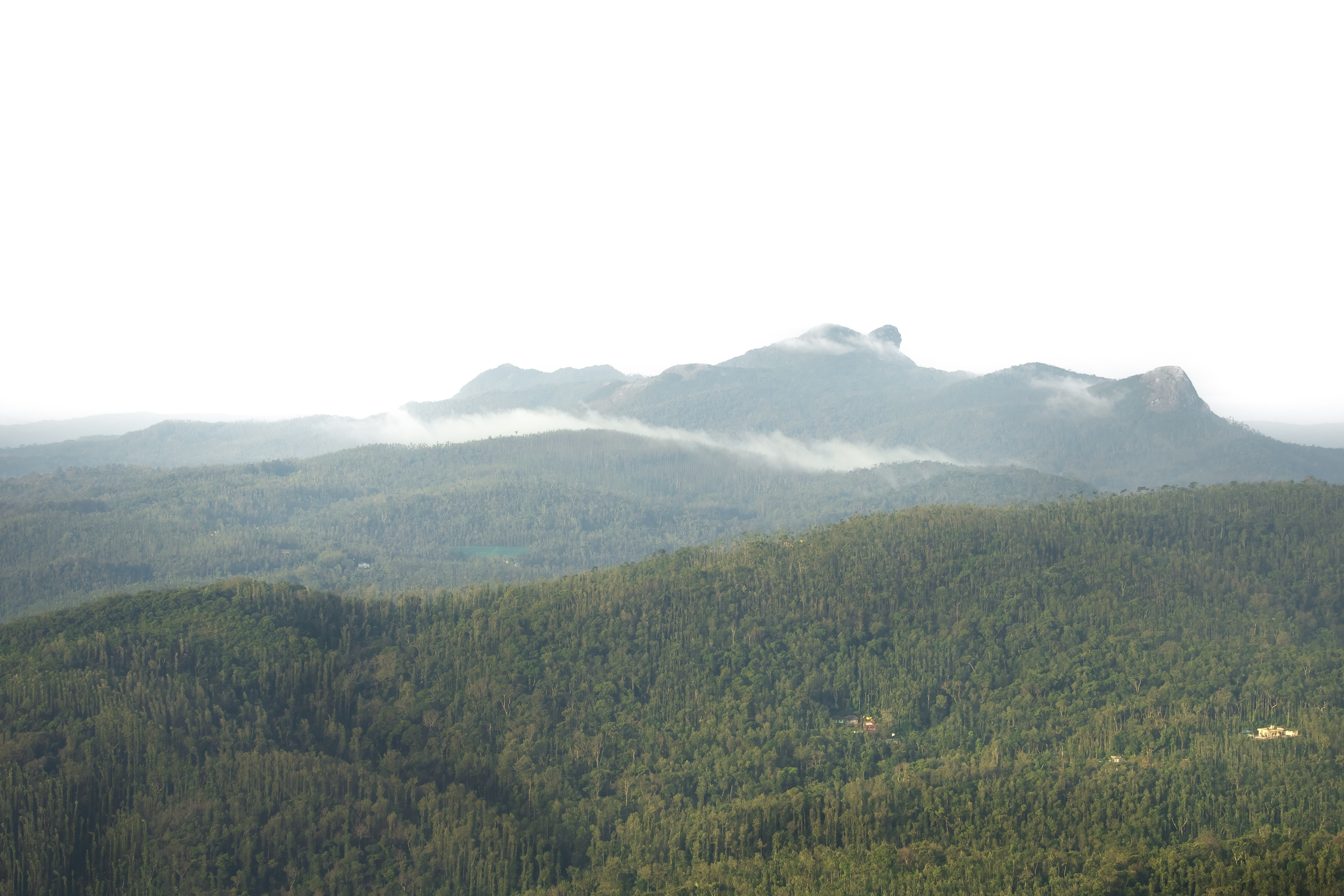
Landscape from Mullayyanagiri peak

== See also ==
- List of peaks in the Karnataka
- Nandi Hills
- Baba Budan giri
- Malnad
- Chamundi Hills
- Kemmangundi
- Kudremukh
- Mangalore
- Nilgiris (mountains)
- Himalayas
- Kodaikanal
- Devaramane
- Munnar
