= Soppinabetta =

State-owned forests in Karnataka, India

Soppinabetta or Soppina betta or Betta (SBFs) are a system of minor, state-owned forests in the Western Ghats region of Karnataka (specifically in areas like Uttara Kannada, Shimoga, and Chikmagalur district) India, that are traditionally leased to areca nut (betel nut) farmers. These "foliage forests" are essential for the local economy, providing the organic mulch, green foliage and leaf litter necessary for composting in areca nut cultivation.

It refers to a specific type of land tenure or forest right. Farmers have user rights to collect green leaves, dry wood, and other minor forest produce from these lands. In the context of the Karnataka Land Revenue Act, it is often categorized as a protected forest or a special classification of land that cannot be freely de-reserved or converted.
