= Ettina Bhuja =

Mountain peak

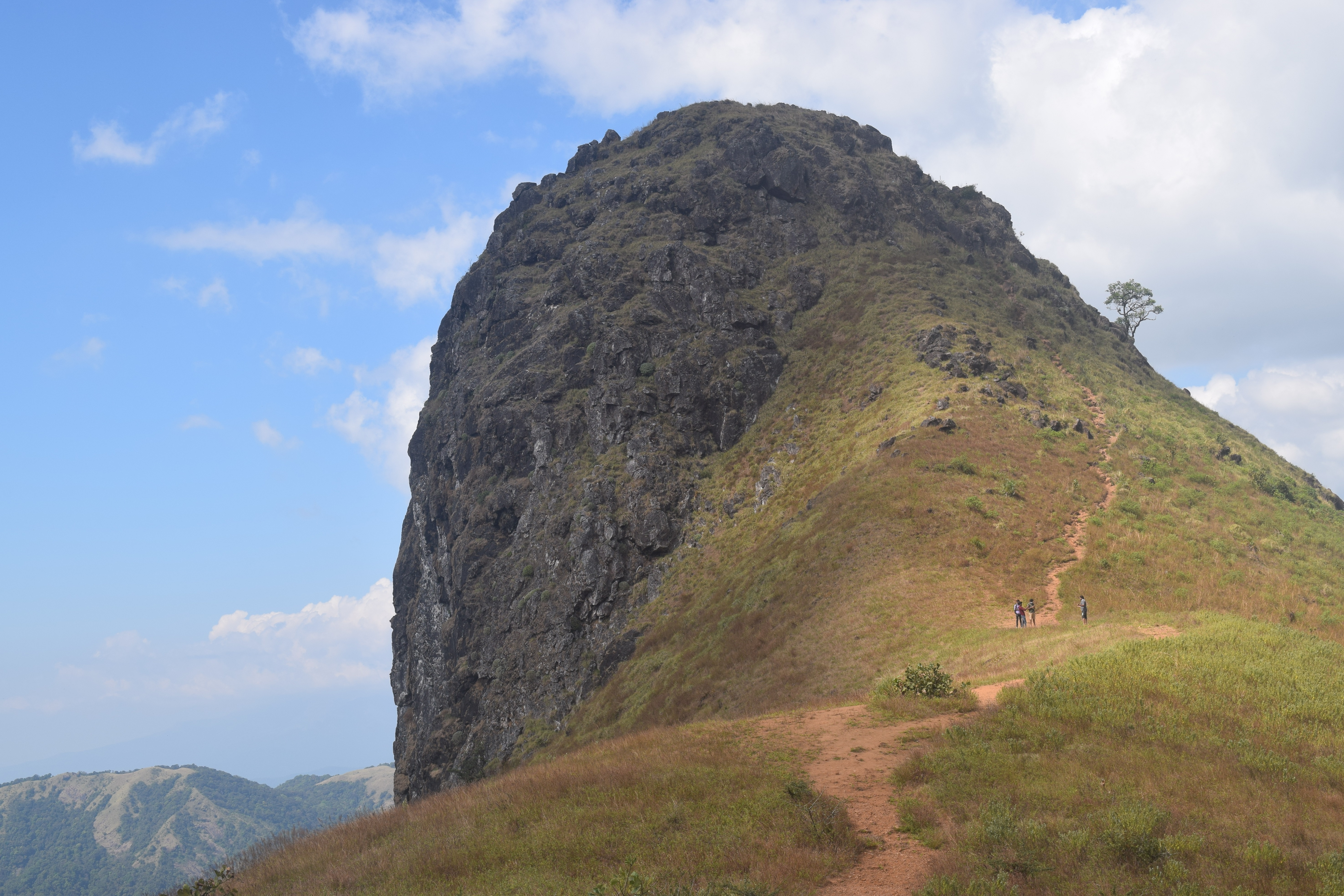
- Unique shape of Ettina Bhuja peak

Highest point
- Elevation: 1,178 m (3,865 ft)
- Coordinates: 12°58′49″N 75°33′56″E

Geography
- Location within Karnataka Location within India
- Location: Mudigere Taluk, Chikkamagaluru district, Karnataka, India
- Parent range: Western Ghats

Climbing
- Easiest route: Hike

Ettina Bhuja is a mountain peak in the Western Ghats, located in Chikmagalur district, Karnataka, about 25 km from Mudigere. It is a popular and easy trekking point as the last two kilometers can be trekked to reach a point near summit.
