= Sirimane Falls =

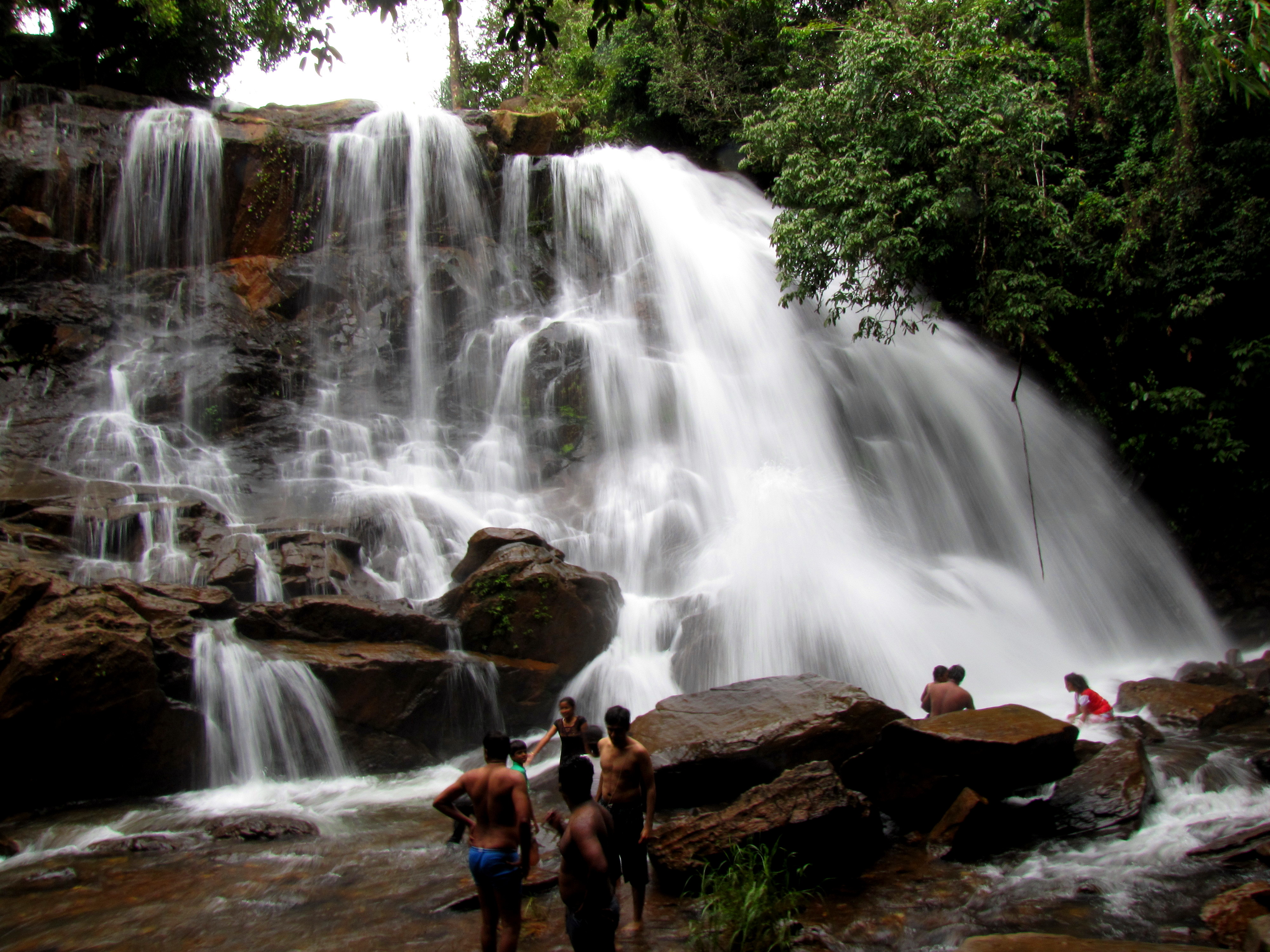
Sirimane Falls

Sirimane Falls is a waterfall in the Western Ghats of Karnataka.

== Location ==
Sirimane Falls is located at a distance of 5 km from Kigga, near Sringeri, a popular pilgrim center. The nearest airport is Mangalore and the nearest railway stations are Udupi (96 km) and Shimoga (114 km).

Kigga, a small village which houses the waterfalls, is about 10 km from Sringeri. Water from the falls feeds coffee estates and paddy fields downstream. An entry fee is collected to maintain the walkways and viewpoints. The money collected also supports a small hydraulic power plant built adjacent to the falls, which provides power to houses in Kigga.

== See also ==
- List of waterfalls
- List of waterfalls in India
