= Kigga =

Kigga Rushyashrungapura
- village
- Country: India
- State: Karnataka
- District: Chikkamagaluru

Languages
  - Official: Kannada
- Time zone: UTC+5:30 (IST)
- Nearest city: Sringeri

Kigga is a small village located at a distance of 9 km from Sringeri in Chikmagalur district. The main attraction of Kigga is Sri Rishya Shringeshwara temple (Rishya Shringa). Another attraction of Kigga is Narasimha Parvatha, the tallest peak in the Agumbe Ghats.

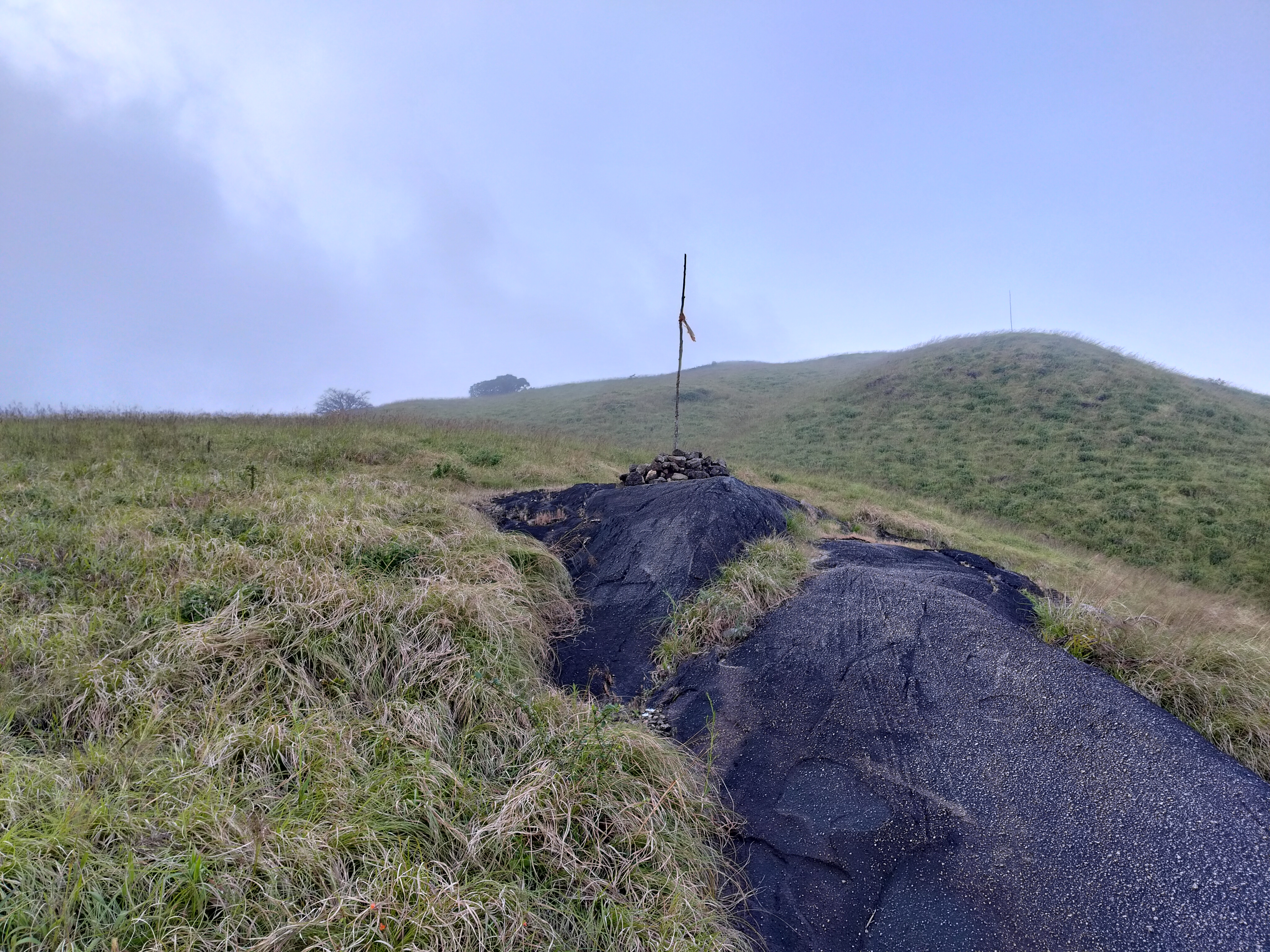
Pole at the summit of Narasimha Parvatha near Kigga village, Karnataka, India

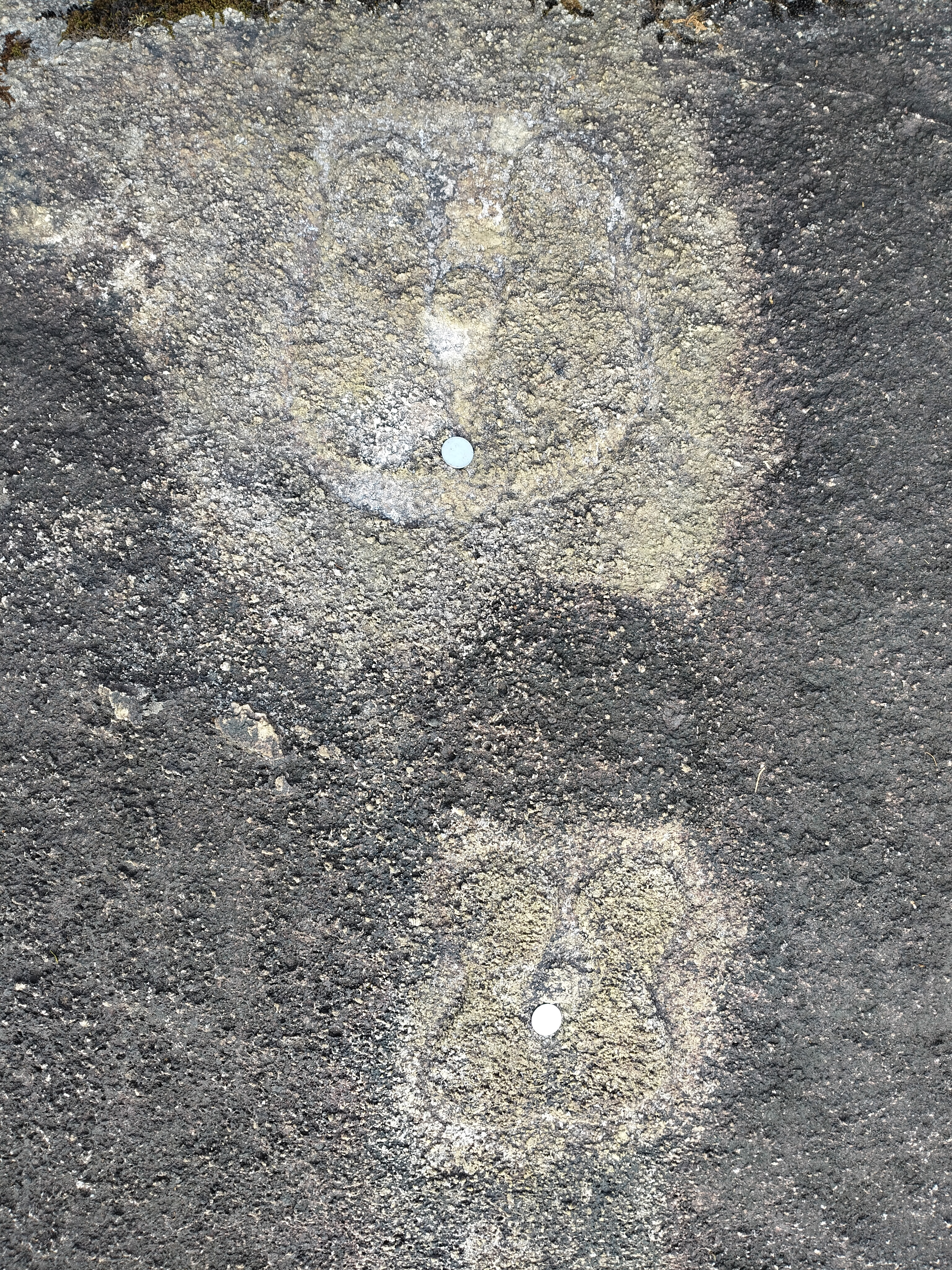
Rock formation claimed by locals to be the feet of Narasimha, at the peak of Narasimha Parvatha near Kigga, Chikkamagaluru district, Karnataka, India

Sirimane waterfall is located nearby Kigga.

The history of Kigga dates back to the era of Ramayana. It is perhaps one of the oldest temples in Karnataka.

Sage Vibhandaka, son of Kashyapa Brahma, engages in penance of Lord Shiva for thousands of years. Due to his devoted meditation, tapojwala from his forehead extended throughout the earth, and there was a chance that the earth would be burnt due to extreme tapo jwala.

Hence, as a plan to control this tapo jwala destroy the earth, all devatas send apsaras to earth from devaloka to deviate the concentration of the sage Vibhandaka.

Apsaras were engaged in jalakreeda on the banks of river Tunga with an intention to attract sage Vibhadaka. On seeing the apsaras on the bank of river Tunga, sage Vibhandaka is distracted by the divine power at work. Due to the momentary vacillation, there was an effusion of semen into the waters of river Tunga. Such an effusion of semen which was flowing in waters of River Tunga, was drunk by a cursed deer, which later gives birth to a male human child who was born with horn and had a divine radiant energy. As per its animal nature, deer leaves the child and walks away from the place.

As a regular practice of spiritual discipline, Sage Vibhandaka visits the banks of river Tunga and listens to a crying sound of a child without anybody around the child. Since the sage is a trikaala jnani (a person who knows past, present, and future) he learns the tale of the child and he identifies the child to be of his family lineage and takes the baby to his ashram to care for him.

As a mark of symbol for having come into existence through a deer, the child had a horn in his head. In Sanskrit, horn is called Shrunga. Since he had a rushi moola (primitive of a sage lineage) and a horn in his head, sage Vibhandaka named the child as "Rishyashrunga." The child grows in the shelter of sage Vibhandaka.

In the meantime, the concubine of King Dasharatha of Kosala desha gives birth to a female child in bad constellation, and the child is named Shanta. She was adopted by Raja Roma pada, King of Angadesha. Since Shanta was born in a bad constellation, there was huge famine in Anga desha for a brief period of 12 years. During such grief period, triloka sanchari Narada visits Anga desha. King Roma pada welcomes sage Narada and briefs him about the grief caused by extended famine in his kingdom. Sage Narada informs King Romapada that if he can ensure sage Rishyashrunga keeps his feet on the Angada desha, the famine will pass end to his divine radiant energy since he is an avatar of rain god. Courtesan women of Anga desha visit sage Vibhandakas ashram and attract sage Rishyashrunga and convince him to visit Anga desha with them.

When Sage Rishyashrunga keeps his foot in Angadesha, the whole kingdom receives sufficient downpour, and famine disappears from the kingdom, and there is complete prosperity within the kingdom.

As per the suggestion of sage Narada, King Romapada gets his adopted daughter Shanta married to Rishyashrunga and makes him the king of Anga desha. Due to the divine magical powers of Rishyashrunga, Anga desha becomes a prosperous country.

During the same period, King Dasharatha was ruling Kosala desha in its full prosperity. but he lacked a son to carry on his dynasty. He decided to perform an putrakamesti yaga in order to beget a son. His counsellor and charioteer, Sumantra, told him of a prophecy that by bringing the sage Rishyasringa to Ayodhyā, he would beget sons. To fulfil the prophecy, Dasharatha travelled to Angadesha and requested Rishyasringa to visit Kosala to perform the Yaga. A Putrakamesti yaga was performed for the attainment of sons.

During its performance, a figure emerged from the fire carrying a vessel of celestial porridge. Dasharatha offers this divine food to Kausalya, Sumitra, and Kaikeyi. Kausalya gives birth to the prince Rama and Kaikeyi to Bharata, and Sumitra became the mother of Lakshmana and Shatrughna, who were avatars of God graced towards Loka kalyana

After ruling Anga desha for some time, Sage Rishyashrunga wishes to continue his penance and comes back to Shrungagiri (Present day Sringeri) with his wife Shanta. On returning to Shrunga giri, he learns that his father Vibhandaka had attained communion in Lord Shiva. He gets an Ashariravani (a human voice heard without the speaker being seen; a voice from the sky or empty space), Wherein he was ordered by the divine power to engage in penance in Narasimha Parvata (this place is situated in deep western ghats behind Kigga village). Lord Narasimha was pleased with his penance and appeared to Rushyashrunga and preached him the "SHIVA PANCHAKSHARI MANTRA, i.e OM NAMAH SHIVAYA" and orders him to continue his penance in Kigga which is in downhill of Narasimha parvata with Shiva panchakshari mantra in devotion to "Lord Chandramouleshwara".

Lord Chandramouleshwara is pleased with his penance and asks for a boon. In anxiety of having pleased the Lord Shiva, the almighty, instead of asking for communion with Lord Shiva, he asks Lord Shiva to be Communited inside him. Lord Shiva agrees for his wish and is communited with Sage Rushyashrunga.

Due to differences in words used for asking the boon, the place was earlier named as "KAGGA." Later, during the course of time, the place started to be called "KIGGA".
