= Sringeri Sharadamba Temple =

- ಶೃಂಗೇರಿ ಶಾರದಾಂಬೆ ದೇವಸ್ಥಾನ
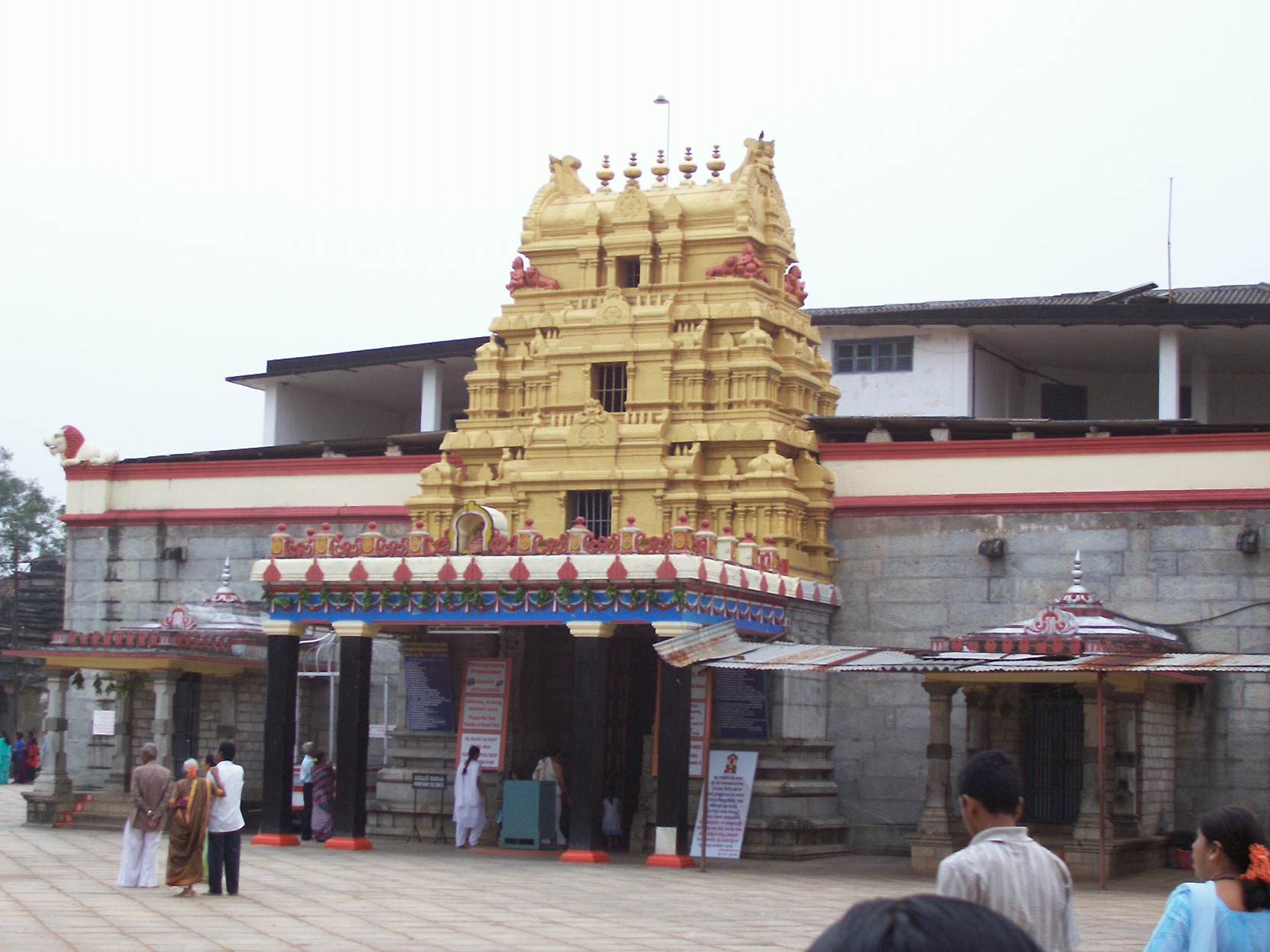
- Entrance of Sharadamba Temple

Religion
- Affiliation: Hinduism
- District: Chikkamagaluru
- Deity: Lord Shiva Sharadamba (Saraswati)
- Festivals: Navaratri, Saraswati Puja,

Location
- Location: Sringeri
- State: Karnataka
- Country: India
- Interactive map of Sringeri Sharadamba Temple
- Coordinates: 13.418°N 75.252°E

Architecture
- Type: South Indian
- Creator: Adi Shankara
- Completed: 5th Century BCE

Sri Sharadamba Temple (ಶೃಂಗೇರಿ ಶಾರದಾಂಬೆ) is a temple dedicated to the Hindu goddess Sharadamba in the town of Sringeri in Karnataka, India, on the Tunga river.

The Sharadamba Temple is an 8th-century temple, established by Adi Shankara, who also established his first Peetham and monastery at the site. The temple is part of the larger complex called Sringeri Sharada Peetham, which is the southern cardinal monastery established by Shankara. The other four are located in Dwarka (West), Puri (East) and Jyotirmath (North). During Third Anglo-Mysore war (1791), this Shringeri temple was destroyed by Pindaris. When Tipu Sultan (Mysore Ruler of that time) heard of this incident, he was deeply angered. Despite being a Muslim ruler, he respected the Math and the Jagadguru. He immediately wrote letters of sympathy to the Sringeri Shankaracharya, offering protection, money, and gifts to restore the temple.
