= Devaramane =

- Village
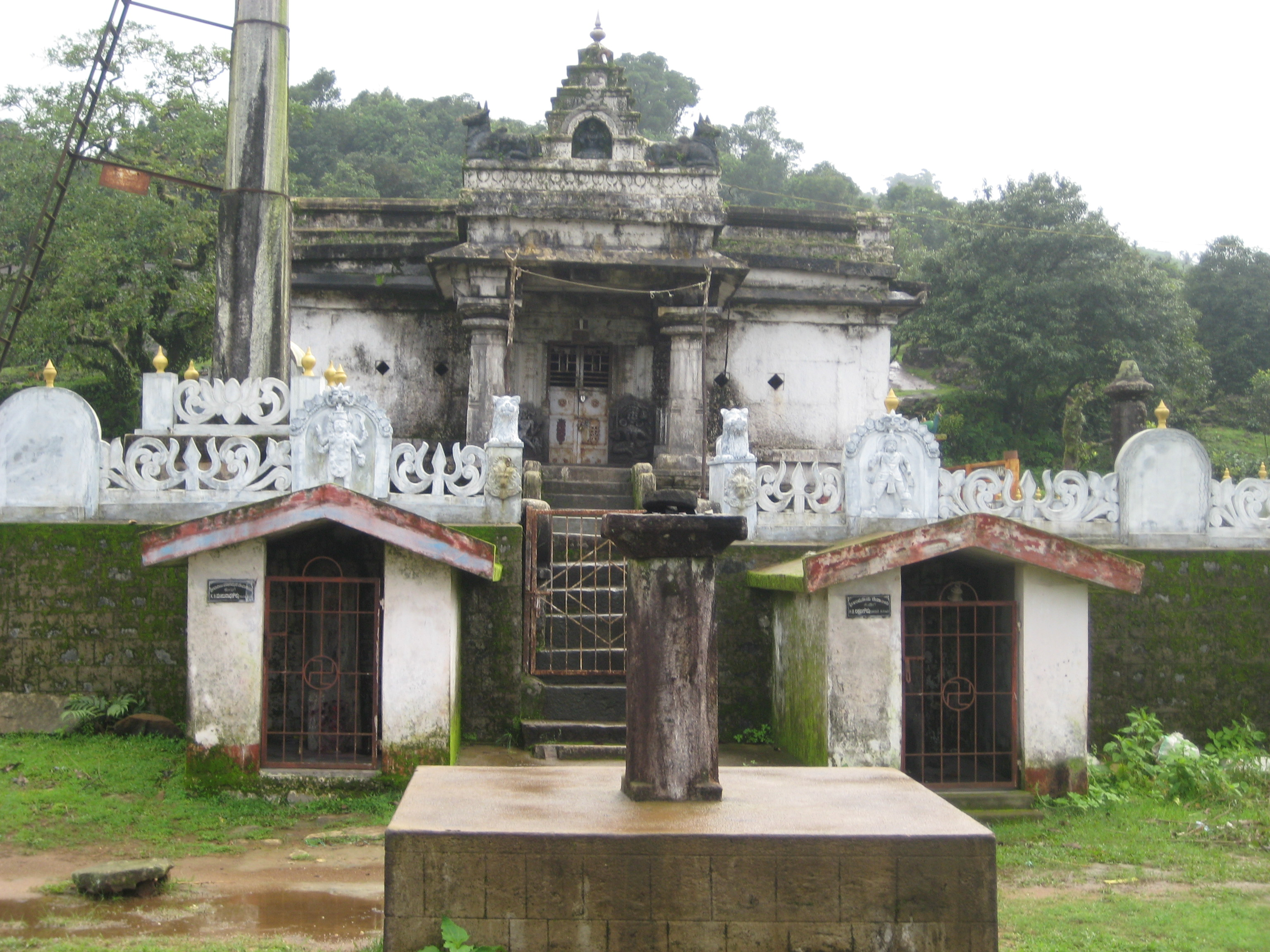
- Kalabhairaveshwara Temple at Devaramane

- Location in Karnataka, India Devaramane (India)
- Coordinates: 13.061586°N 75.538752°E
- Country: India
- State: Karnataka
- District: Chikkamagaluru

Government
  - MLA: MP KUMARASWAMY

Languages
  - Official: Kannada
- Time zone: UTC+5:30 (IST)
- PIN: 577 113
- Telephone code: 08263
- Vehicle registration: KA-18
- Website: http://www.devaramane.org

Devaramane is a village in Mudigere Taluk, Chikkamagaluru district in the state of Karnataka, India. The village is renowned for its Kalabhairaveshwara temple. The road to reach temple is rough and not in best condition.

== Transport ==
By Road: Regular buses ply from Bengaluru (259 km), Chikkamagaluru (30 km), Hassan (62 km), Mangaluru (124 km), Mysuru (149 km) to Mudigere. Nearest Railway: Hassan (about 32 km from Mudigere) Banavara and Arasikere are also near Mudigere. Nearest Airport:Mangalore about 124 km from Mudigere.

== Agriculture and commerce ==
The primary mode of employment in the Devaramane region is agriculture. Crops grown include coffee, rice, finger millet, pepper, cardamom with paddy being dominant.

== See also ==
- Hoysala architecture
- Shravanabelagola
