= Chikmagalur district =

Chikmagalur district Chikkamagaluru district
- District of Karnataka
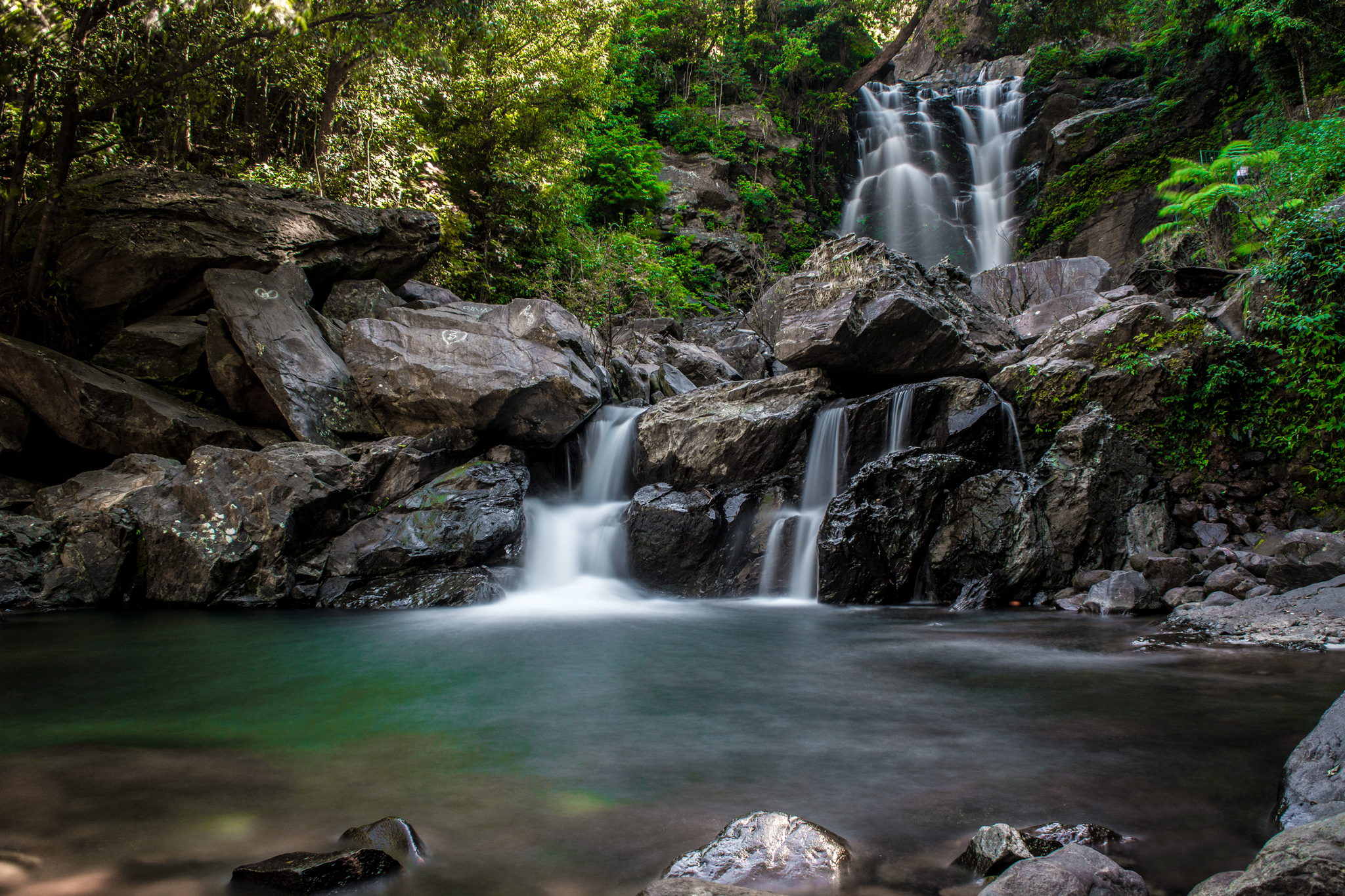
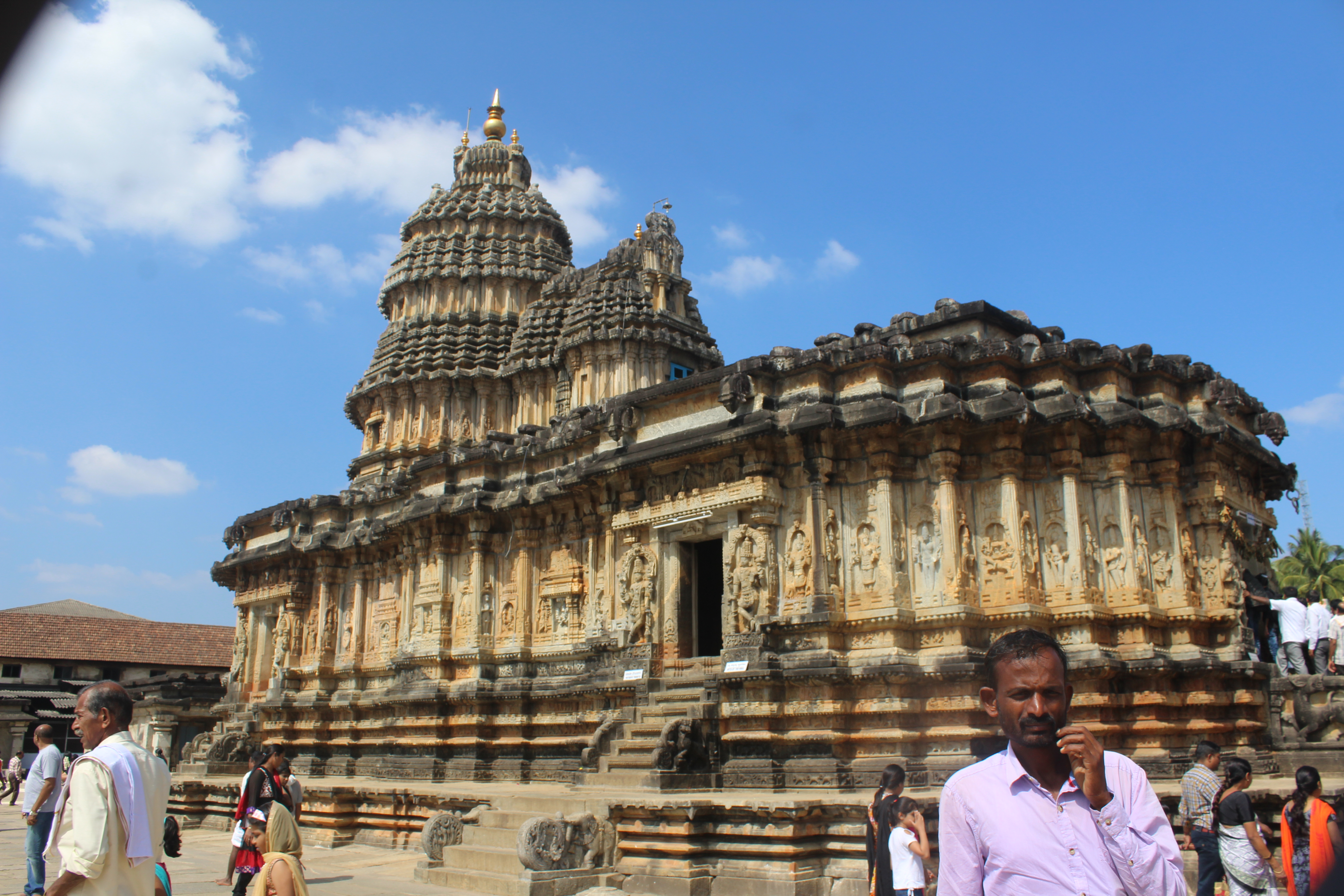
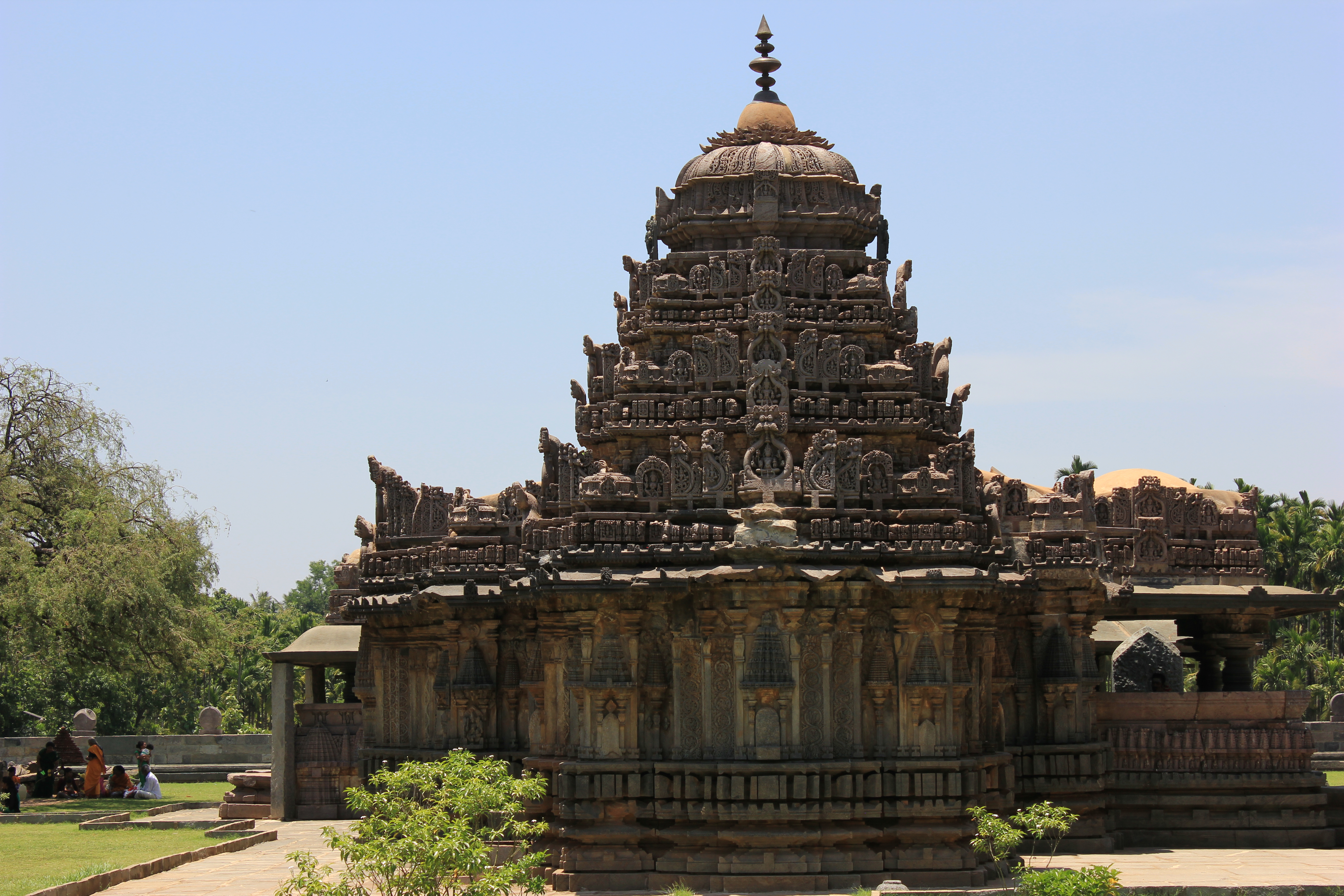
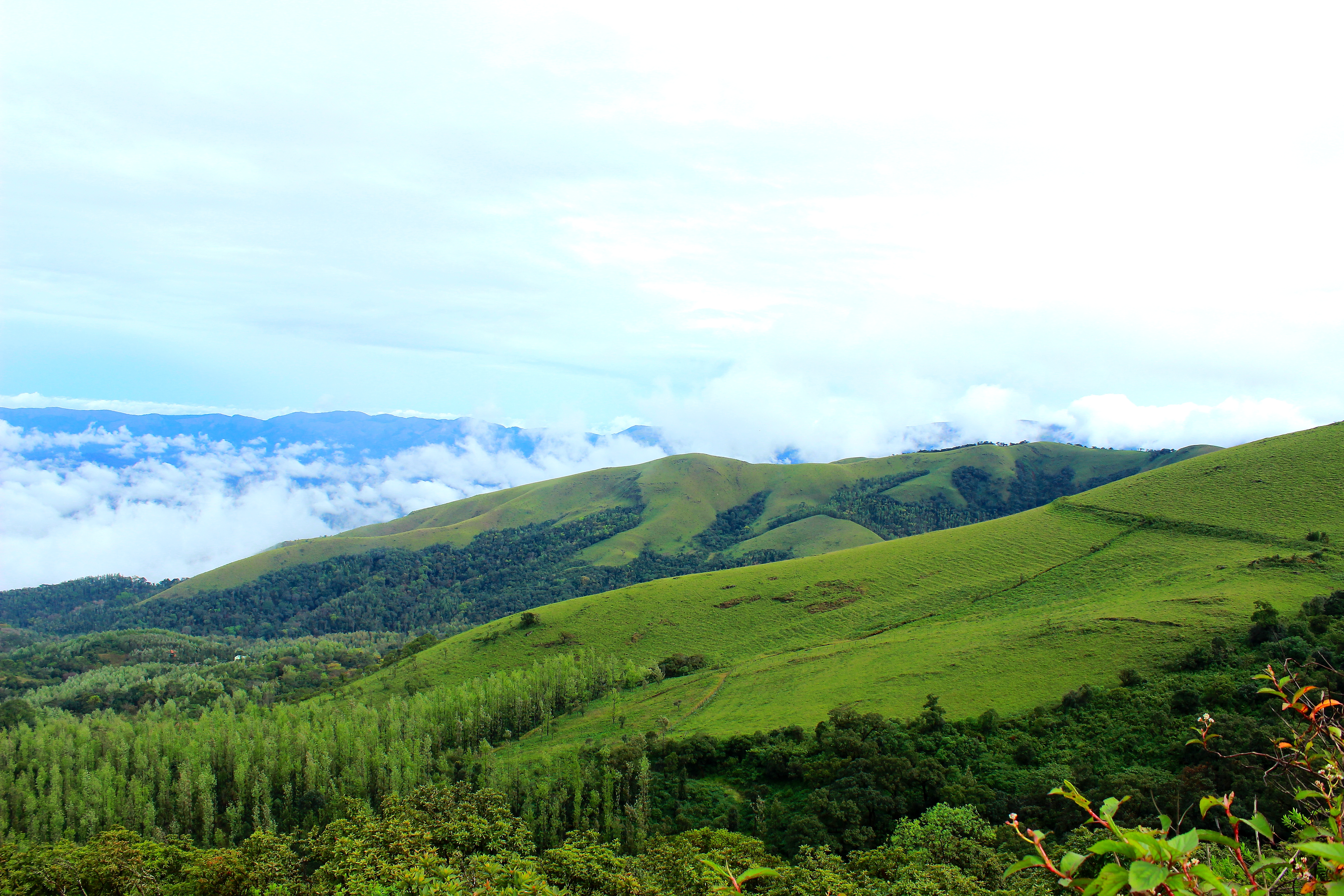
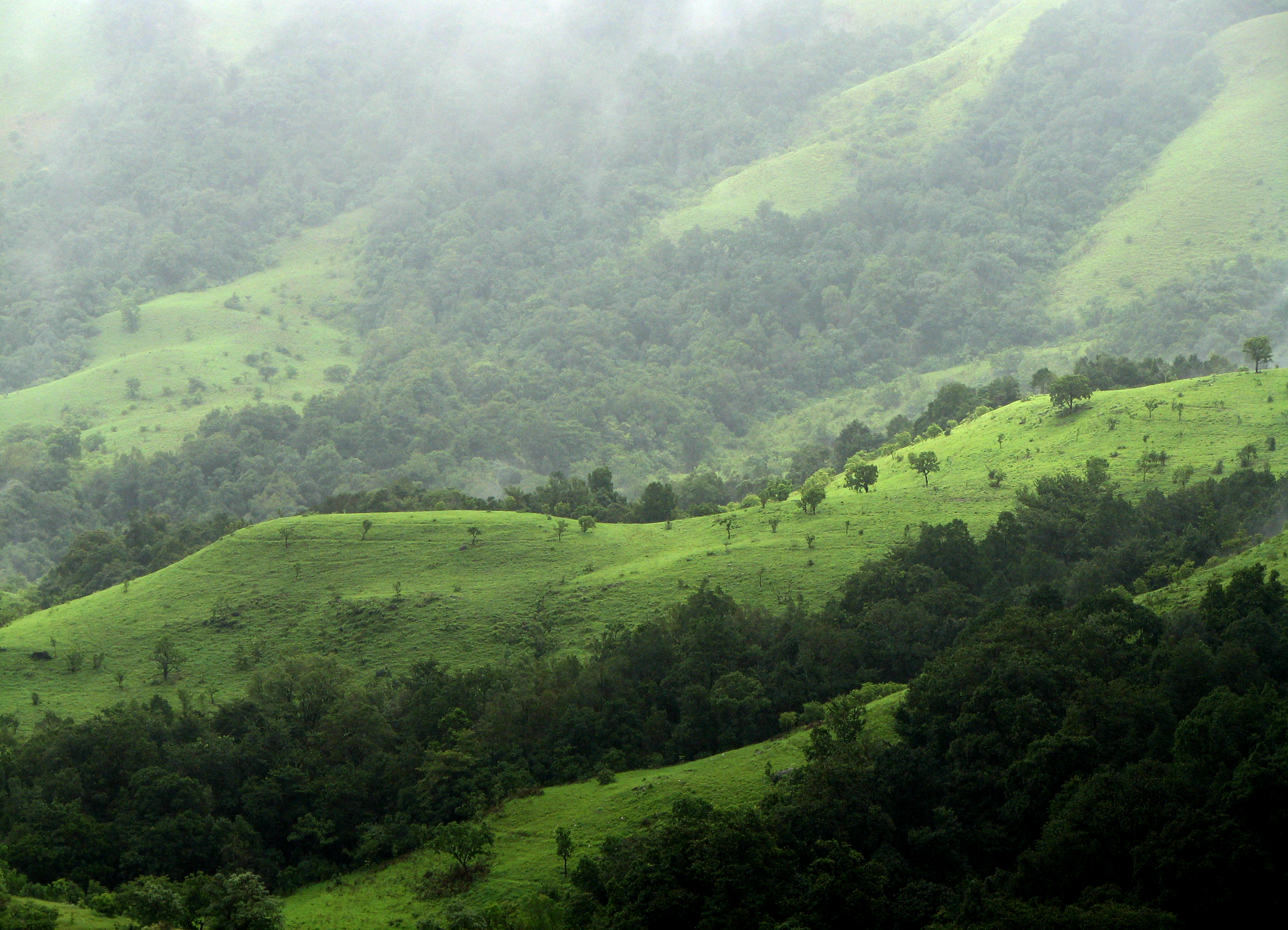
- Clockwise from top-left: Hanumana Gundi Falls, Vidyashankara Temple at Sringeri Sharada Peetham, Amruteshwara Temple, View from Mullayyanagiri, Bhadra Reservoir
- Nickname: Coffee Land of Karnataka
- Interactive map of Chikmagalur district
- Coordinates: 13.32°N 75.77°E
- Country: India
- State: Karnataka
- Division: Mysore
- Kadur district: 1886-1947
- Founder: Chamarajendra Wadiyar X
- Headquarters: Chikmagalur
- Talukas: Chikmagalur, Kadur, Tarikere, Mudigere, Sringeri, Koppa, Narasimharajapura, Ajjampura, Kalasa

Government
  - Deputy Commissioner and District Magistrate: Bhanwar Singh Meena_{IAS}

Area
  - Total: 7,201 km^{2} (2,780 sq mi)
- Highest elevation: 1,925 m (6,316 ft)

Population (2011)
  - Total: 1,137,961
  - Density: 158.0/km^{2} (409.3/sq mi)

Languages
  - Official: Kannada
- Time zone: UTC+5:30 (IST)
- Vehicle registration: Chikmagalur KA-18; Tarikere KA-66
- Website: chikkamagaluru.nic.in/en/

Chikmagalur district, officially Chikkamagaluru district (IPA: [t͡ʃikːɐmɐɡɐɭuːru]) is an administrative district in the Malnad subregion of Karnataka, India. It was called Kadur (Cuddoor) district till 1947. Coffee was first cultivated in India in Chikmagalur. The hills of Chikmagalur are parts of the Western Ghats and the source of Tunga and Bhadra rivers. Mullayanagiri, the highest peak in Karnataka is located in the district. The area is well known for the Sringeri Mutt that houses the Dakshina Peeta established by Adi Shankaracharya.

== Etymology ==
Chikmagalur district gets its name from its headquarters of Chikmagalur town. It is alternatively spelt as Chikkamagaluru, also misspelt and mispronounced as Chikkamangaluru. Chikmagalur literally means "The town of the younger daughter" (chikka "small", magalu "daughter", uru "town") in the Kannada language. The town is said to have been given as a dowry to the younger daughter of Sakharaya, the legendary local chieftain of Sakrepatna hence the name, In another theory it is said that the name of the chieftain is Rukmāngada.

== History ==
Chikmagalur is the region where the Hoysala rulers started and spent the early days of their dynasty. According to a legend, it was at Sosevur, now identified with Angadi in Mudigere Taluk that Sala, the founder of the Hoysala dynasty, killed the legendary tiger, immortalised in the Hoysala crest. It is known that Veera Ballala II (1173 – 1220 CE), the great king of Hoysala empire, has built the Shri Mallikarjuna Swamy Temple at Yagati in Kadur Taluk and Amriteshwara temple at Amrithapura in Tarikere Taluk.

Coffee was introduced into India through the Chikmagalur district when the first coffee crop was grown in the baba budan giri range during 1670 AD. The saint Baba Budan on his pilgrimage to Mecca travelled through the seaport of Mokha, Yemen, where he discovered coffee. To introduce its taste to India, he wrapped seven coffee beans around his belly and got them out of Arabia. On his return home, he planted the beans in the hills of Chikmagalur.

== Geography ==
Chikmagalur, the headquarters of Chikmagalur district, is 251 kilometres (156 mi) from the state capital of Bangalore, and is surrounded by the Chandra Drona hills and dense forests. The district is between 12° 54´ 42´´ and 13° 53´ 53´´ North latitude and between 75° 04´ 46´´ and 76° 21´ 50´´ east longitude. Its greatest length from east to west is about 138.4 kilometres and from north to south 88.5 kilometres. The district receives normal average rainfall of 1925 mm. The highest point in the district is Mullayanagiri, 1,926 m above sea level which is also the highest point in the state of Karnataka. 30% of the district (2108.62 km^{2}) is covered with forests. The district borders Shimoga to the north, Davanagere to the north-east, Chitradurga and Tumkur districts to the east, Hassan to the south, Dakshina Kannada to the south-west and Udupi to the west.

=== Rivers (Mouth) ===
- Netravati (Arabian Sea)
- Bhadra (Tungabhadra)
- Tunga (Tungabhadra)
- Hemavathi (Kaveri)
- Vedavathi (Tungabhadra)
- Yagachi (Hemavathi)

=== Mountain Peaks ===
- Mullayyana Giri
- Kudremukha
- Kemmangundi Hill Station
- Devaramane betta
- Ettina Bhuja
- Unnamed peak at 13°31′55″N 75°52′13″E - Lesser known peak located in Kadur taluk between Shakunagiri and Hogarekhangiri, at an elevation, 1573 metres above MSL, overlooking Madagada Kere.

=== Climate and rainfall ===
Chikmagalur is a large district with its East-West dimension larger than its North-South. This vast area covers higher western ghats in the west to lower semi-arid plains in the east. Thus, evergreen forest, wet deciduous, dry deciduous and dry forests are all found in the district. Rainfall pattern follows West-East direction, with western portion receiving a whooping 5000mm rainfall annually and eastern portion receiving less than 1000mm. Kigga village in Sringeri taluk is the wettest place in the Chikmagalur district, as per Karnataka State Natural Disaster Monitoring Centre(KSNDMC).Daily temperature ranges between 18-32°celsius on any given day across the district. During summers the temperature reaches as high as 38-40 °C and during winters there is high diurnal temperature variation as the night temperature dips below 10 °C.

== Demographics ==
Historical population
Year	Pop.	±% p.a.
1901	359,270	—
1911	338,457	−0.59%
1921	333,538	−0.15%
1931	347,715	+0.42%
1941	358,290	+0.30%
1951	417,538	+1.54%
1961	597,305	+3.65%
1971	736,647	+2.12%
1981	911,769	+2.16%
1991	1,017,283	+1.10%
2001	1,140,905	+1.15%
2011	1,137,961	−0.03%

Religions in Chikmagaluru district (2011)
Religion	Percent
Hinduism	88.28%
Islam	8.90%
Christianity	2.28%
Other or not stated	0.54%

According to the 2011 census, Chikmagalur district has a population of 1,137,961, roughly equal to the nation of Cyprus or the US state of Rhode Island. This gives it a ranking of 408th in India (out of a total of 640). The district has a population density of 158 inhabitants per square kilometre (410/sq mi). Its population growth rate over the decade 2001–2011 was −0.28%. Child proportion(0-6 Age) accounts for 9.26% of the population. Chikmagalur has a sex ratio of 1005 females for every 1000 males, and a literacy rate of 79.24%. 21.05% of the population lives in urban areas. Scheduled Castes and Scheduled Tribes make up 22.29% and 3.95% of the population respectively.

Among taluks, Sringeri taluk has the least population whereas Chikmagalur taluk has the highest population.

Languages of Chikmagalur district (2011)
1. Kannada (72.7%)
2. Urdu (7.39%)
3. Tulu (5.52%)
4. Tamil (3.75%)
5. Telugu (2.79%)
6. Malayalam (2.47%)
7. Lambadi (1.97%)
8. Konkani (1.30%)
9. Others (2.07%)

At the time of the 2011 census, 72.74% of the population spoke Kannada, 7.39% Urdu, 5.52% Tulu, 3.75% Tamil, 2.79% Telugu, 2.47% Malayalam, 1.97% Lambadi and 1.30% Konkani as their first language.

== Administration ==
Chikmagalur district falls under the Mysore Division of Karnataka. It is divided into two Revenue Sub-divisions, Chikmagalur Sub-Division and Tarikere Sub-Division. Chikmagalur Sub-Division comprises the taluks of Chikmagalur, Koppa, Mudigere and Sringeri whereas the Tarikere Sub-Division comprises the taluks of Tarikere, Kadur, Ajjampura and Narasimharajapura. The Deputy Commissioner (also the District Magistrate) is the functional head of the district. Each Sub-Division has Assistant Commissioners and each Taluk has Tahsildars who work under the control and supervision of the Deputy Commissioner.

== Economy ==
Agriculture is the economical back bone of the Chikmagalur district with coffee cultivation forming the major part of it. Agricultural production in the district is spread over three seasons — namely Kharif, Rabi and Summer. Important crops grown are cereals, i.e. rice, ragi, jowar, maize and minor millets, pulses like red gram, horse gram, green gram, avrekai (Hyacinth Beans), black gram and Bengal gram. Oil seeds like groundnut, sesamum, sunflower, castor and commercial crops like sugarcane, cotton, and tobacco are also grown here.

Chikmagalur is the second largest coffee producing district, after Kodagu, and also the largest producer of Arabica Coffee in India. The Coffee Board located in Chikmagalur town is the government authority that oversees the production and marketing of coffee cultivated in the district. Coffee is cultivated in Chikmagalur district in an area of around 85,465 hectares with Arabica being the dominant variety grown in upper hills and Robusta being the major variety in the low level hills. There are around 15,000 coffee growers in this district with 96% of them being small growers with holdings of less than or equal to 4 hectares. The average production is 55,000 MT: 35,000 MT of Arabica and 20,000 MT of Robusta. The average productivity per hectare is 810 kg for Arabica and 1110 kg of Robusta, which are higher than the national average.

=== Industries ===
Chikmagalur district unfortunately has not made good progress in terms of Industrial Development. Inadequate infrastructure investors preferring non-industrial ventures over industrial ones are quoted as some of the reasons for the backwardness of Industrial Development in this district.

There is only one Large Scale industry in this district, i.e. M/s Kudremukh Iron Ore Company Ltd. (KIOCL) in Kudremukh area of Mudigere Taluk. KIOCL was established in 1976 to develop the Kudremukh mine and to produce 7.5 million tonnes of concentrate per year. The facilities were commissioned in 1980 and the first shipment of concentrate was made in October 1981. A pelletisation plant with a capacity of 3 million tonnes per year was commissioned in 1987 for production of high quality blast furnace and direct reduction grade pellets for export. KIOCL received a massive setback when its mining licence expired and operations were stopped by the Supreme Court with effect from 31 December 2005. With many of the employees losing their jobs and the social backlash that may result thereof, efforts are being made to generate jobs for these workers in other areas.

There are two industrial estates in Chikmagalur district, one located near Chikmagalur town and the other near Birur in Kadur Taluk. The Chikmagalur Industrial Estate is spread over 13.20 acres (53,400 m^{2}) of land where the one at Birur is spread over 11.1 acres (45,000 m^{2}). Karnataka Industrial Area Development Board (KIADB) is also developing an Industrial Area of over 145 acres (0.59 km^{2}) near Amble village of Chikmagalur taluk.

== Tourism ==
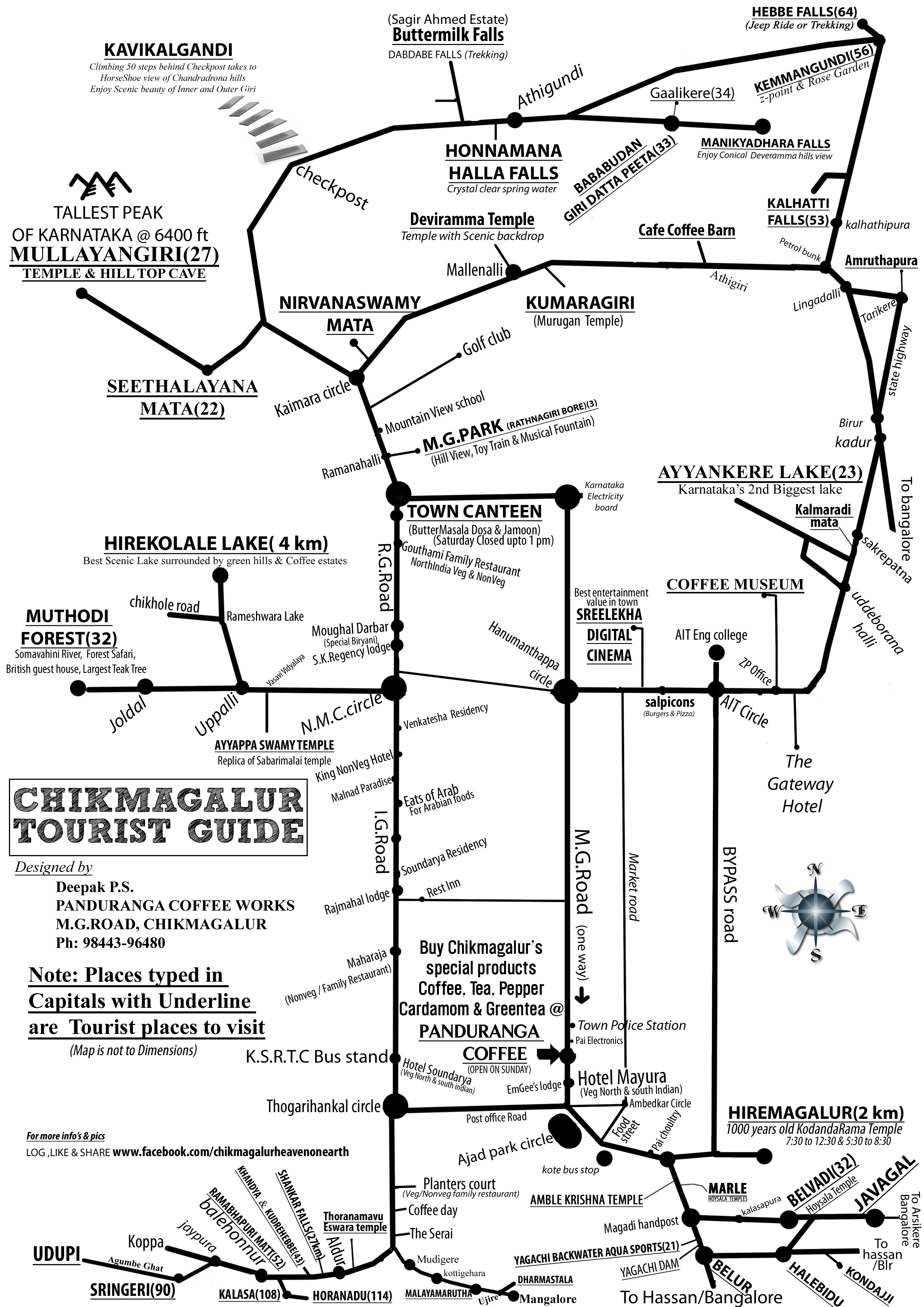
Chikmagalur tourist map

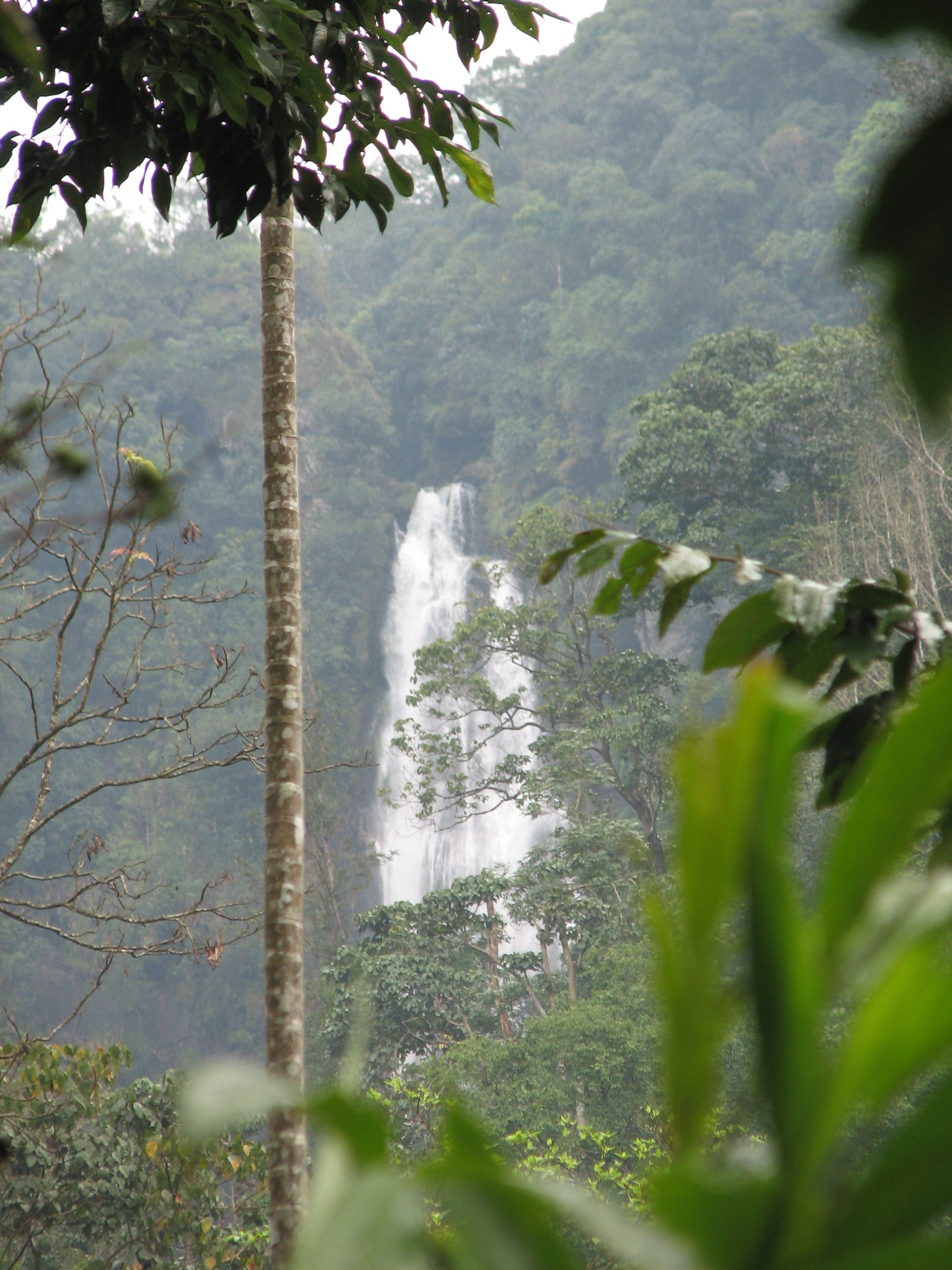
Hebbe Falls, near Kemmannugundi

Hill stations in the district are: Kemmangundi, Kudremukh, Mullayanagiri, Baba Budan Giri also known as Datta Peeta, Deviramma Betta. Waterfalls are: Manikyadhara Falls, Kallathigiri Falls, Hebbe Falls, Shanti Falls, Shankar Falls, Hanumana Gundi Falls, Kadambi Falls, Sirimane Falls, Dabdabe Falls etc. Reservoirs and lakes are Bhadra Dam, Hirekolale lake, Ayyenkere lake etc.

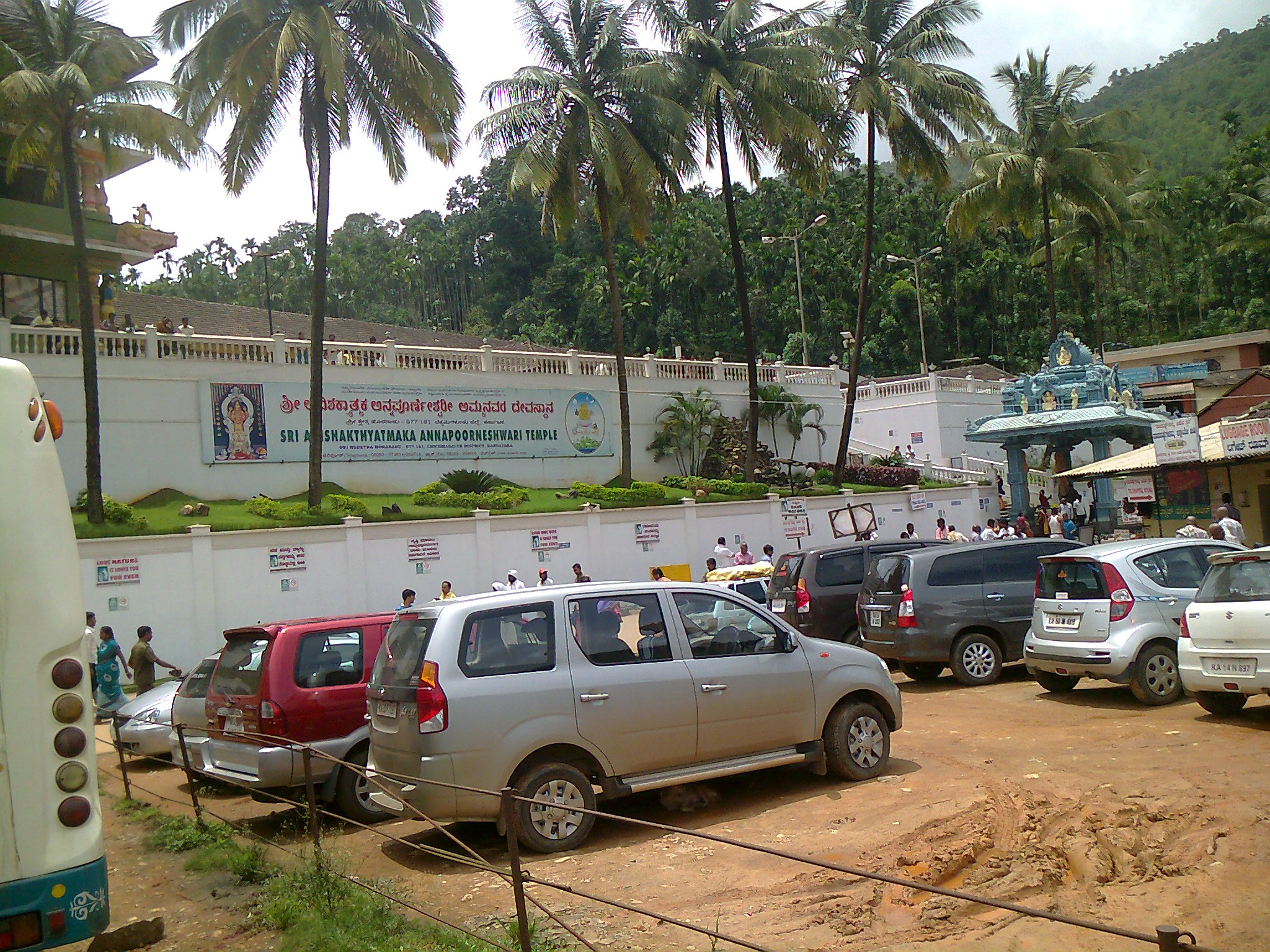
Annapoorneshwari Temple, Horanadu

Temple towns are Sringeri, Horanadu, Kalasa, Narasimharajapura, Amritapura etc.

== Transport ==
=== Road ===
Chikmagalur district is known for not well maintained roads. The poor state of the roads has hampered development of this district to some extent; more so because of the absence of even a good rail network in this district. The total length of roads in this district is 7264 km. There are only three National Highways that pass through this district; the National Highway NH-69 (Bangalore to Honnavar) passes through the towns of Kadur, Birur & Tarikere, a spur highway NH-173 passes through Kadur - Chikmagalur - Mudigere connecting Port City Mangaluru via Charmadi ghat and another spur highway NH-373 towards Hassan.

=== Rail ===
Chikmagalur, Kadur and Tarikere and Ajjampura taluks have railway lines passing through them. The total length of railway line passing through the district is 136 km. Birur Junction and Kadur Junction railway station are the two Railway Junctions in the District. A new railway line connecting Chikmagalur to the main Bangalore-Arsikere-Hubli line was inaugurated in 2013. The commencement of the new line connecting Chikmagalur to Sakleshpura on the Bangalore–Mangalore trunk line has already been started.

=== Air ===
Chikmagalur district has a small airport near Gowdanahalli village about 10 kilometres (6.2 mi) from Chikmagalur town. Its suitable for small charted planes. The nearest domestic airport is Shivamogga Airport at 100 km; Mangaluru is the nearest International Airport at 155 km. The KIAB is 265 km from Chikmagaluru.

== Education ==
According to 2011 census, the percentage literacy rate of Chikmagalur district is 79.25% with 85.41% of males and 73.16% of females being literate. The literacy rate of Chikmagalur is higher than the average literacy rate of Karnataka state which is 75.36%. Sringeri Taluk has the highest literacy rate of 92.68% and Kadur Taluk with 74.33% being the least literate one.

As of 2011, there are 13 degree colleges (with 4615 students) offering graduate education in Chikmagalur district which are affiliated to Kuvempu University. Chikmagalur taluk has the maximum 4 graduate colleges (with 1648 students) whereas kadur has 2 and Koppa, Mudigere, Narasimharajapura and Sringeri taluks have only 1 graduate college each.

Primary and secondary education

As of 2001, there are 1620 primary schools (with 151,923 students) and 235 secondary schools (high schools with 34,607 students) in Chikmagalur district. Chikmagalur taluk with 414 primary schools (42,774 students) has the most primary schools with Sringeri Taluk having the fewest at 80 primary schools (5822 students). Kadur Taluk with 74 secondary schools (9990 students) has the most secondary schools with Sringeri Taluk having the fewest at 9 secondary schools (1492 students).

Higher secondary education

As of 2001, there are 46 colleges (with 4711 students) offering Higher Secondary (Pre-University) education in Chikmagalur district. Kadur Taluk with 12 Higher-Secondary colleges (1324 students) has the most Higher-secondary colleges with Sringeri Taluk having the fewest, two Higher-secondary colleges (160 students).

Technical education

- Adichunchanagiri Institute of Technology Polytechnic, Chikmagalur
- Jawahar Navodaya Vidyalaya, Seegodu
- Chikkamagaluru Institute of Medical Sciences
- Kendriya Vidyalaya, Kadrimidri

== Villages ==
- Bisalehalli
- Vidyaranyapura Agrahara, Sringeri
