= Sringeri =

Sringeri Shringeri, Shringagiri
- Town
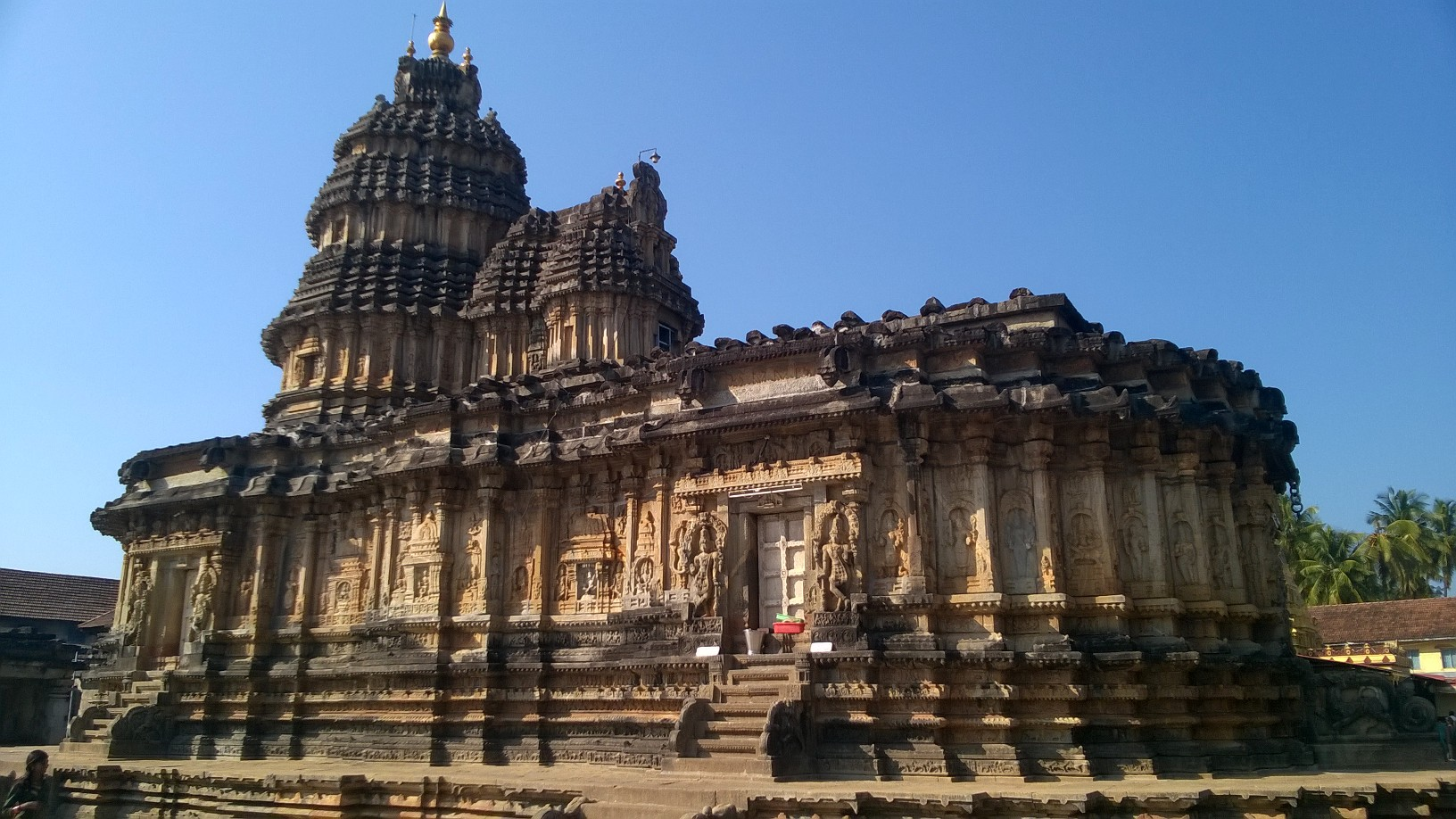
- Sri Vidyashankara temple (1342 CE) at Sringeri

- Location within Karnataka
- Coordinates: 13.42°N 75.25°E
- Country: India
- State: Karnataka
- District: Chikmagalur
- Region: Malenadu

Government
  - Body: Town Panchayat
  - Chief Officer: R. Sreepad
  - MLA: T D Rajegowda (Indian National Congress)

Area
  - Town: 1.8 km^{2} (0.69 sq mi)
  - Rural: 442.38 km^{2} (170.80 sq mi)
- Elevation: 672 m (2,205 ft)

Population (2011)
  - Town: 3,922
  - Density: 2,200/km^{2} (5,600/sq mi)
  - Rural: 32,617

Languages
  - Official: Kannada
- Time zone: UTC+5:30 (IST)
- PIN: 577139
- Telephone code: 08265
- Vehicle registration: KA-18
- Website: www.shringeritown.mrc.gov.in

Sringeri (IAST: Śṛṅgerī; Kannada: [ʃriŋɡeːri]) also called Shringeri is a hill town and Taluk headquarters located in Chikmagalur district in the Indian state of Karnataka.

Sringeri is the site of Sri Sharadamba temple, a part of the Sringeri Sharada Peetham established by Adi Shankaracharya.

== Etymology ==
The name Sringeri is derived from Rishyashringa-giri, a nearby hill that is believed to have contained the hermitage of Rishi Vibhandaka and his son Rishyashringa. In an episode in the Bala-Kanda of the Ramayana, Vasishtha narrates how Rishyashringa brought rains to the drought-stricken kingdom of Romapada. Later the place name was shortened to Shringagiri

According to legend, Adi Shankaracharya is said to have selected the site as the place to stay and teach his disciples, because when he was walking by the Tunga River, he saw a cobra with a raised hood, providing shelter from the hot sun to a frog undergoing labour. Astonished by the place where natural enemies had gone beyond their instincts, he stayed here for twelve years. Sri Adi Shankaracharya also established Mathas in the subcontinent (the northern one at Jyotirmath, near Badrinath), eastern (at Puri) and western (at Dwaraka) of India.

== Geography ==
Sringeri is located at 13.42°N 75.25°E. It has an average elevation of 672 meters (2204 feet). The average annual temperature is 23.5 °C, with the highest temperatures reaching 32 °C in April and lowest temperatures of 16 °C in winter months (December–January). There is significant rainfall (annual average of 3949 mm ), mostly during the months of June, July and August.

=== Rainfall ===
In 2018, Sringeri received an annual rainfall of 4,981 millimetres (196.1 in), while Kigga hobli received 6,968 millimetres (274.3 in), one of the highest in the state that year. During 2019 and 2022, Sringeri received 3,819 millimetres (150.4 in) and 3,892 millimetres (153.2 in) of annual rainfall, respectively.

Climate data for Sringeri
Month	Jan	Feb	Mar	Apr	May	Jun	Jul	Aug	Sep	Oct	Nov	Dec	Year
Average rainfall mm (inches)	3 (0.1)	2 (0.1)	13 (0.5)	78 (3.1)	111 (4.4)	785 (30.9)	1,398 (55.0)	1,016 (40.0)	268 (10.6)	190 (7.5)	70 (2.8)	15 (0.6)	3,949 (155.6)
Average rainy days	0	0	1	5	6	22	28	26	16	11	4	1	120

== Demographics ==
As of the 2011 India census, Sringeri had a population of 36,539. Males constitute 49% of the population and females 51%. Sringeri has an average literacy rate of 86%, higher than the national average of 74%: male literacy is 90%, and female literacy is 82%. In Sringeri, 8.5% of the population is under 6 years of age.

== See also ==
- Agumbe
- Belur and Halebidu
- Dharmasthala
- Hanumanagundi falls
- Karkala
- Kundadri hills
- Horanadu
- Mangalore
- Chikmagalur
- Subramanya
