= Hanumana Gundi Falls =

Waterfall in Karnataka, India

Hanuman Gundi Falls
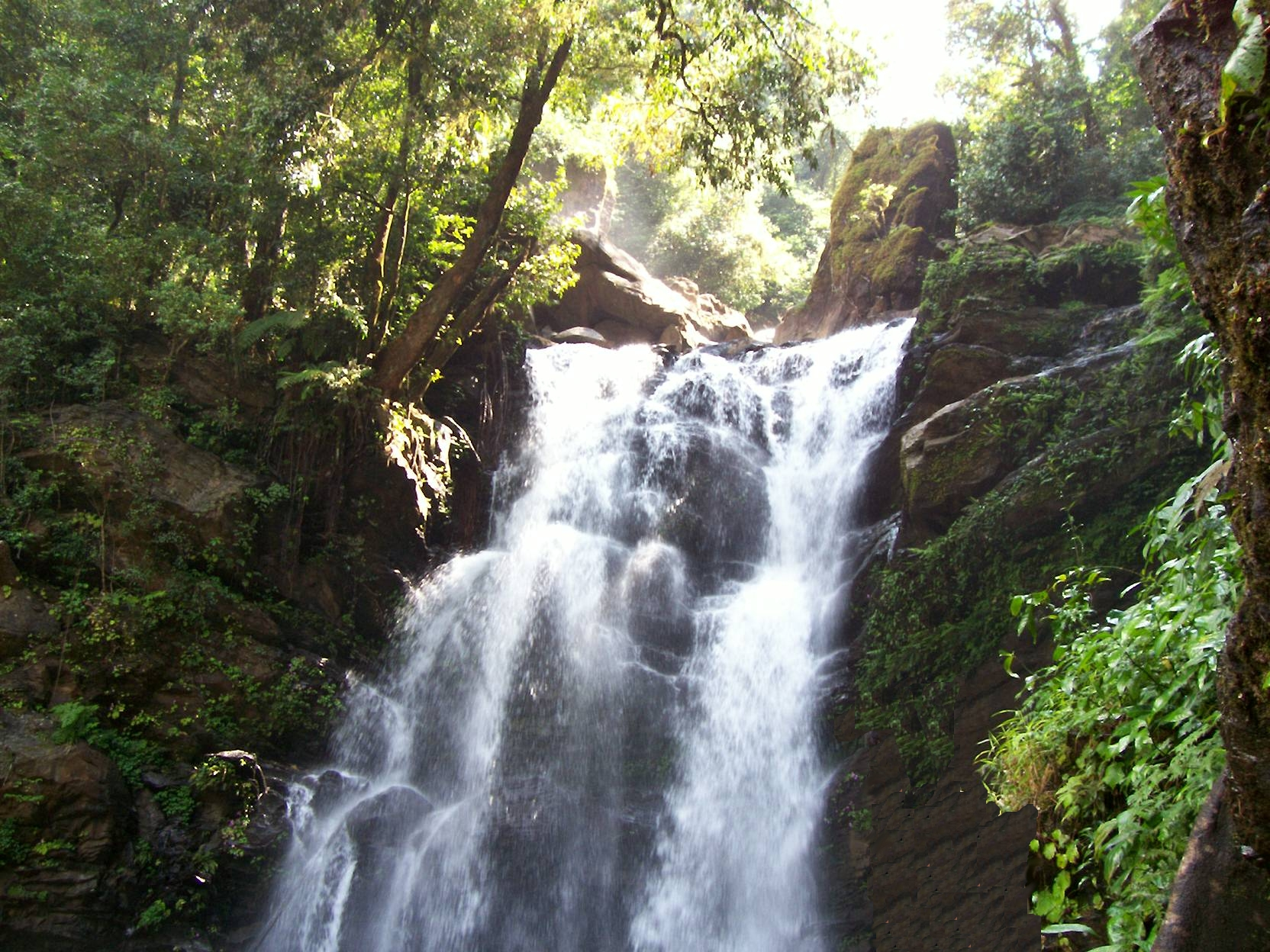
- Hanuman Gundi Falls

- Location within Karnataka
- Location: Chikmagalur district, Karnataka
- Coordinates: 13°16′10″N 75°09′19″E
- Type: Tiered
- Elevation: 996 m (3,268 ft)
- Total height: 22 m (72 ft)

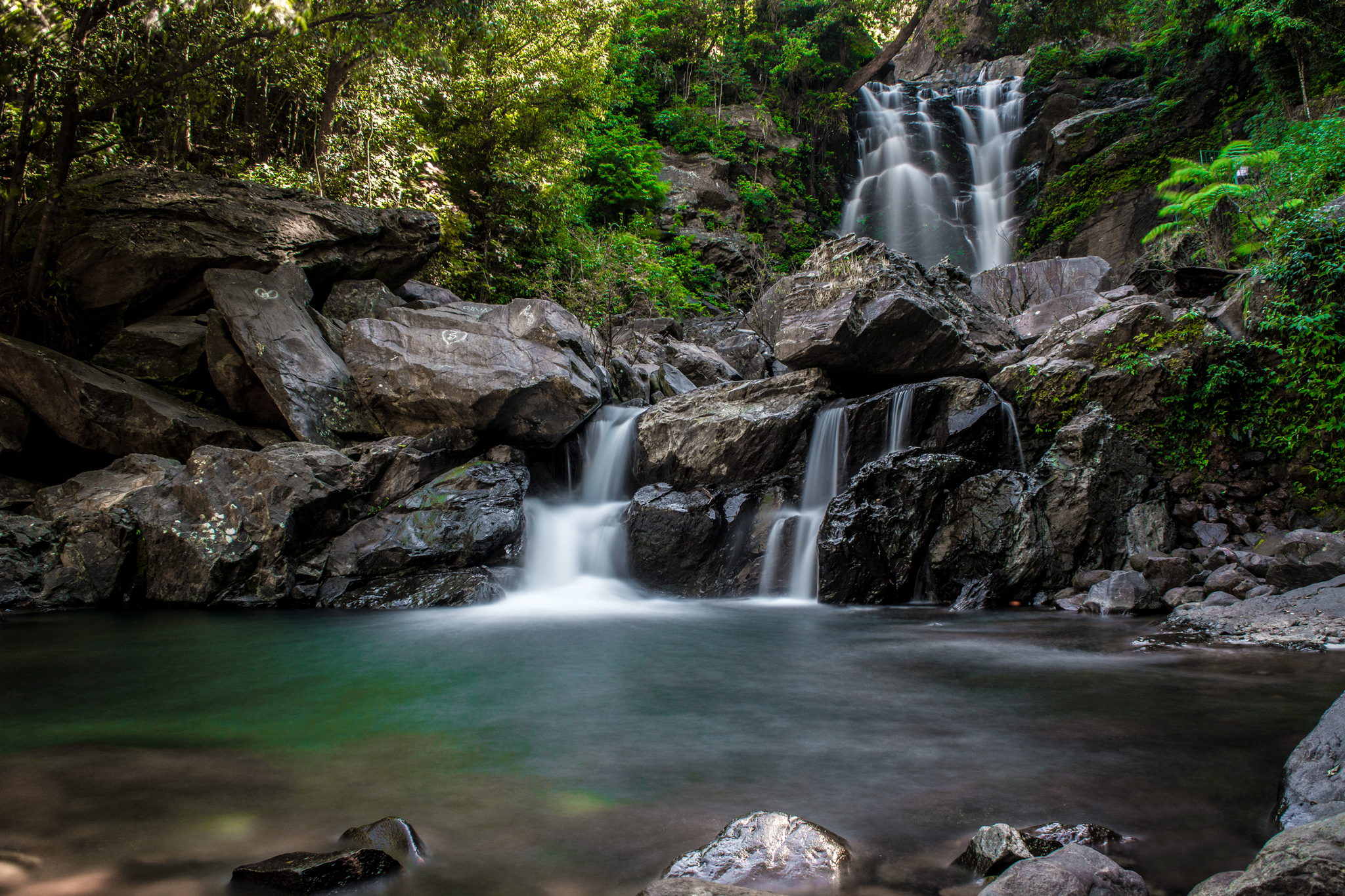
Hanuman Gundi Falls (Chikamagalur)

Hanumana Gundi Falls, also known as Suthanabbe Falls or Soothanabbi Falls, is located in the hilly surroundings of the Kudremukh National Park in the Chikkamagaluru district of Karnataka, India.

Hanumanagundi Falls is located between Karkala and Lakya Dam in the Kudremukh national park. Hanumanagundi Falls has an elevation of 996 m (3,268 ft). The water falls from a height of 22 m (72 ft) and is a tiered waterfall. Hanumanagundi Falls is situated at a distance of 79 km (49 mi) from Mangalore.

== See also ==
- List of waterfalls
- List of waterfalls in India
