= Malkapur =

Malkapur may refer to:

- Malkapur, Akola, Maharashtra, India
- Malkapur, Buldhana district, Maharashtra, India
  - Malkapur railway station
  - Malkapur Assembly constituency
- Malkapur, Karad, Maharashtra, India
- Malkapur, Kolhapur, Maharashtra, India
- Malkapur, Ranga Reddy district, Telangana, India
- Malkapur, Yadadri Bhuvanagiri, Telangana, India
- Malkapur Municipal Council, Satara district, Maharashtra

== See also ==
- Malikpur (disambiguation)
- Malkapuram, neighbourhood in Visakhapatnam, Andhra Pradesh, India
- Malkapuram, Eluru district, village in Andhra Pradesh, India
