= Malikpur =

Malikpur or Malik Pur may refer to:

- Malikpur, Gujrat, village in Gujrat District, Punjab, Pakistan
- Malikpur, Jhajjar, village in Jhajjar district, Haryana, India
- Malik Pur, Buner, union council in Khyber Pakhtunkhwa, Pakistan
- Malik Pur, Mansehra, village and union council in Khyber Pakhtunkhwa, Pakistan
- Malikpur, Khanewal, village in Punjab, Pakistan

== See also ==
- Malkapur (disambiguation)
- Malikipuram, town in Andhra Pradesh, India
- Malikipuram mandal, mandal (sub-district) in Andhra Pradesh, India containing the town
- Malikpura Urban, union council in Khyber-Pakhtunkhwa, Pakistan
- Mallickpurhat railway station, railway station in West Bengal, India
- Maalikapurathamma, form of the Hindu god Ayyappa, family deity of the Pandalam dynasty of Kerala, India
- Malikappuram, a 2022 Indian film
- Malikappuram: Apathbandhavan Ayyappan, an Indian TV series
