= Malkapur, Karad =

Malkapur
- Town
- Interactive map of Malkapur
- Coordinates: 17.28°N 74.2°E
- Country: India
- State: Maharashtra
- District: Satara

Government
  - Body: Municipal Council
- Elevation: 566 m (1,857 ft)

Population (2011)
  - Total: 31,671
- Time zone: UTC+5:30 (IST)
- PIN: 415539
- Telephone code: +91-2164
- Vehicle registration: MH 50
- Website: malkapur24x7.com/event_en

Malkapur is a town in Karad taluka, Satara district, southern Maharashtra, India. Located near the city of Karad, it lies along National Highway 48. In 2008, it became a nagar panchayat.

In collaboration with Maharashra Jeevan Pradhikaran, the town introduced the "Malkapur 24x7 Water System" to increase the reliability of the water supply. This project won the 2010 National Urban Award and the 2009-2010 Prime Minister's Award for Excellence in Public Administration.

It is also implementing Solar City Project in which municipal council gives subsidy on purchasing any solar-powered equipment and reducing power dependency on MSEB.

== History ==
Originally Malkapur was a village with small population near the Karad city. The basic occupation was agriculture with the educated people travelling to Karad and Satara for employment. Due to limited space available in Karad and the proximity to NH4 highway lot of businesses started in Malkapur. People started flooding in here which lead to the establishment of schools, hospitals, shops, commercial centers, etc. Eventually, it was declared as a town with a Municipal Council.

== Geography ==
Malkapur is located at 17.28°N 74.2°E. It has an average elevation of 566 metres (1857 feet). Malkapur is located near Aghashiv hill17.237506°N 74.15205°E. It has been referred in Mahabharata. The hill has the shape of an "Aum" (Devanagari?) when viewed aerially.

=== Climate ===
Malkapur belongs to the subtropical category of climate characterized by medium to heavy rainfall and moderate temperature. Three main seasons in the region are:

- Rainy Season (June to Sept)
- Winter season (Oct to Jan)
- Summer Season (Feb to May)

Average maximum temperature is 36 °C and minimum temperature is 11 °C. May is the hottest and December is coldest month of the year. The maximum rainfall is in June to Aug from south-west monsoon. The average rainfall is 540.40 mm in Malkapur.

== Transportation ==
Malkapur lies near National Highway 48, which connects it with Mumbai, Pune, Bangalore, and Chennai. The nearest railway station is Karad. The nearest passenger airport is Kolhapur Airport.

== Education ==
High schools

- KCT's Krishna English Medium, Malkapur, Karad.
- Anandrao Chavan Vidyalaya, Malkapur, Karad
- Rotary School, Malkapur, Karad.
- Star English Medium School, Malkapur, Karad
- Shrimati Premlatai Chavan Kanya Shala, Malkapur, Karad

Engineering colleges

- Shri Santkrupa College of Engineering, Ghogaoan, Karad

Arts, Science, and Commerce colleges

- KCT's Jr. College of Science Malkapur, Karad

Polytechnic colleges

- Shri SanShri Santtkrupa Polytechnic College, Ghogaoan, Karad

Other colleges

- Krishna Institute of Medical Sciences, Malkapur, Karad

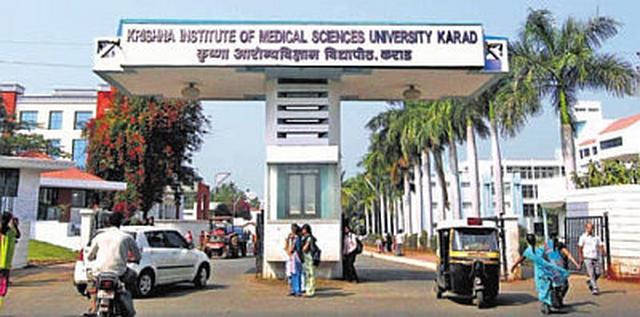
Krishna College Karad

- Bharti Vidyapeeth Law College, Malkapur, Karad
- Yashavantrao Mohite Institute of Management, Malkapur, Karad
- Jaywant International School, Wathar

== Tourism ==
Some tourist points near Malkapur include:

- Preeti Sangam (Confluence of Koyna & Krishna River) + Krishna Mai Temple + Late Yashwantrao Chavan's Samadhi.
- Koyna Dam 40 km
- Chandoli Dam 55 km
- Uttarmand Dam 38 km
- Sadashivgad
- Agashiv Caves
- Gol Ghummat (Kaapil)
- Naktya Rawalchi Vihir (Ancient Well)
- Masjid Built by Sultan Ali Adilshah (1557- 1580)
- Ram Mandir Chaphal 35 km
- Talbid (Ram Mandir and Vasant fort) 12 km
- Sagareshwar Wildlife Sanctuary
- Valmiki Temple & Big Wild Area(45 km from Dhebevadi Fata)
- Pachawadeswar (Narayanwadi)8 km
- Kaas plateau 86 km
- Thoseghar Waterfall 86 km
- Walmiki 45 km

== Controversies ==
=== Sanjay Patil Murder Case ===
Wrestler and winner of the Maharashtra Kesari title Sanjay Patil was shot dead on 15 January 2009 near Krishna hospital in Malkapur. Salim alias Sallya Chepya of Karad and eight others were arrested by the Karad police in connection with the murder and a charge sheet was also filed in the court.

== Notable people ==
- Prithviraj Chavan: He was the 17th Chief Minister of Maharashtra. Chavan served as the Minister of State in the Prime Minister's Office in the Ministry of Parliamentary Affairs and Ministry of Personnel, Public Grievances, and Pensions. Chavan was also General Secretary of the All-India Congress Committee (AICC), in-charge of many states, including Jammu and Kashmir, Karnataka, Haryana, Gujarat, Tripura, and Arunachal Pradesh.
- Shri. Manohar Shinde (Chair Person)
- Shri. Suhas Anandrao Jadhav (Vice chairman of MalaiDevi Patsanstha)

== See also ==
- Malkapur Municipal Council
