= Yerphal Caves =

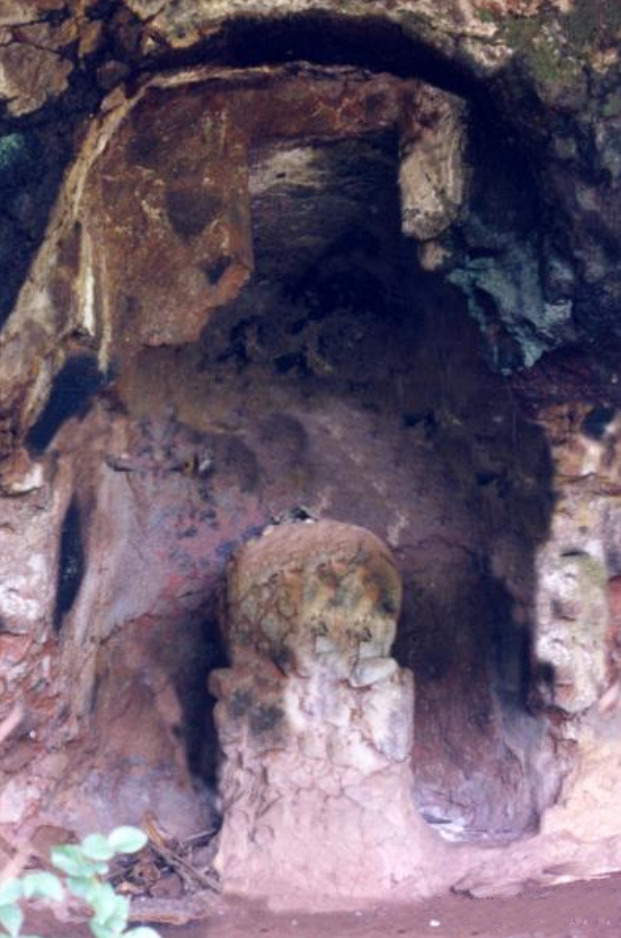
- Remains of a stupa in Yerphal caves.

- Location within India Location within Maharashtra
- Coordinates: 17.382077°N 73.942973°E

Yerphal Caves, also Yerphale Caves, are a small group of Buddhist caves located near Umbraj, Maharashtra, India. The caves were only discovered recently, in 1979. It is located not far from the Karad Caves (about 25 km).

The group contains a small chaitya hall with an apsidal plan with a stupa inside. There are also two cells, and an unfinished cave. The caves can be dated to the first half of the 2nd century CE.

Yerphale caves was in dense forest area where wild animals lived.
