= Pritisangam =

- IUCN category IV (habitat/species management area)
- Location within Maharashtra
- Location: Satara, Maharashtra, India
- Nearest city: Karad, Satara, Pune, Kolhapur
- Coordinates: 17.285°N 74.184°E

Pritisangam is a place where the Krishna River and Koyna River, meet. Both rivers originate from Mahabaleshwar and meet each other at Karad from front. This sangam is very rare in world where two rivers come from front and take a turn and become one river. Pritisangam meaning Confluence of Love.

== Places nearby ==
There is beautiful natural Ghat nearby sangam and temple of Gramdevi of Karad, Krishnamai. Now there is very good garden and it is most visited tourist spot in Karad. This place is also famous for the Samadhi of Late Yashwantrao Chavan who was first Chief Minister of Maharashtra India. It is built on the banks of rivers at Pritisangam. Some of the well-known places are Krishnamai Temple, high minarets. There is famous well known as "Nakatya Rawlyachi Vihir".
