= Yashwantrao Chavan =

Indian politician (1913-1984)

- Chavan on a 2010 postage stamp of India

5th Deputy Prime Minister of India
- In office 28 July 1979 – 14 January 1980
- Prime Minister: Chaudhary Charan Singh
- Preceded by: Chaudhary Charan Singh; Jagjivan Ram
- Succeeded by: Chaudhary Devi Lal

Union Minister of Home Affairs
- In office 28 July 1979 – 14 January 1980
- Prime Minister: Chaudhary Charan Singh
- Preceded by: Hirubhai M. Patel
- Succeeded by: Zail Singh
- In office 14 November 1966 – 27 June 1970
- Prime Minister: Indira Gandhi
- Preceded by: Gulzarilal Nanda
- Succeeded by: Indira Gandhi

Union Minister of External Affairs
- In office 10 October 1974 – 24 March 1977
- Prime Minister: Indira Gandhi
- Preceded by: Sardar Swaran Singh
- Succeeded by: Atal Bihari Vajpayee

Union Minister of Finance
- In office 27 June 1970 – 10 October 1974
- Prime Minister: Indira Gandhi
- Preceded by: Indira Gandhi
- Succeeded by: Chidambaram Subramaniam

Union Minister of Defence
- In office 14 November 1962 – 13 November 1966
- Prime Minister: Jawaharlal Nehru; Gulzarilal Nanda (Interim); Lal Bahadur Shastri; Gulzarilal Nanda (Interim); Indira Gandhi
- Preceded by: Jawaharlal Nehru
- Succeeded by: Sardar Swaran Singh

1st Chief Minister of Maharashtra
- In office 1 May 1960 – 14 November 1962
- Preceded by: Office established (Himself for Bombay State)
- Succeeded by: Marotrao Kannamwar

3rd Chief Minister of Bombay State
- In office 1 November 1956 – 30 April 1960
- Preceded by: Morarji Desai
- Succeeded by: Office abolished: Jivraj Narayan Mehta (Gujarat); Himself (Maharashtra)

Personal details
- Born: Yashwantrao Balwantrao Chavan; 12 March 1913 Deorashtre, Sangli State, British India
- Died: 25 November 1984 (aged 71) Delhi, India
- Resting place: Yashwantrao Chavan Samadhi, Karad
- Party: Indian National Congress (until 1977; 1981–1984)
- Other political affiliations: Indian National Congress (Urs) (1977); Indian National Congress (Socialist) (1978–1981)
- Spouse: Venutai Chavan (m. 1942)
- Education: ILS Law College, University of Mumbai
- Website: www.yashwantraochavan.in

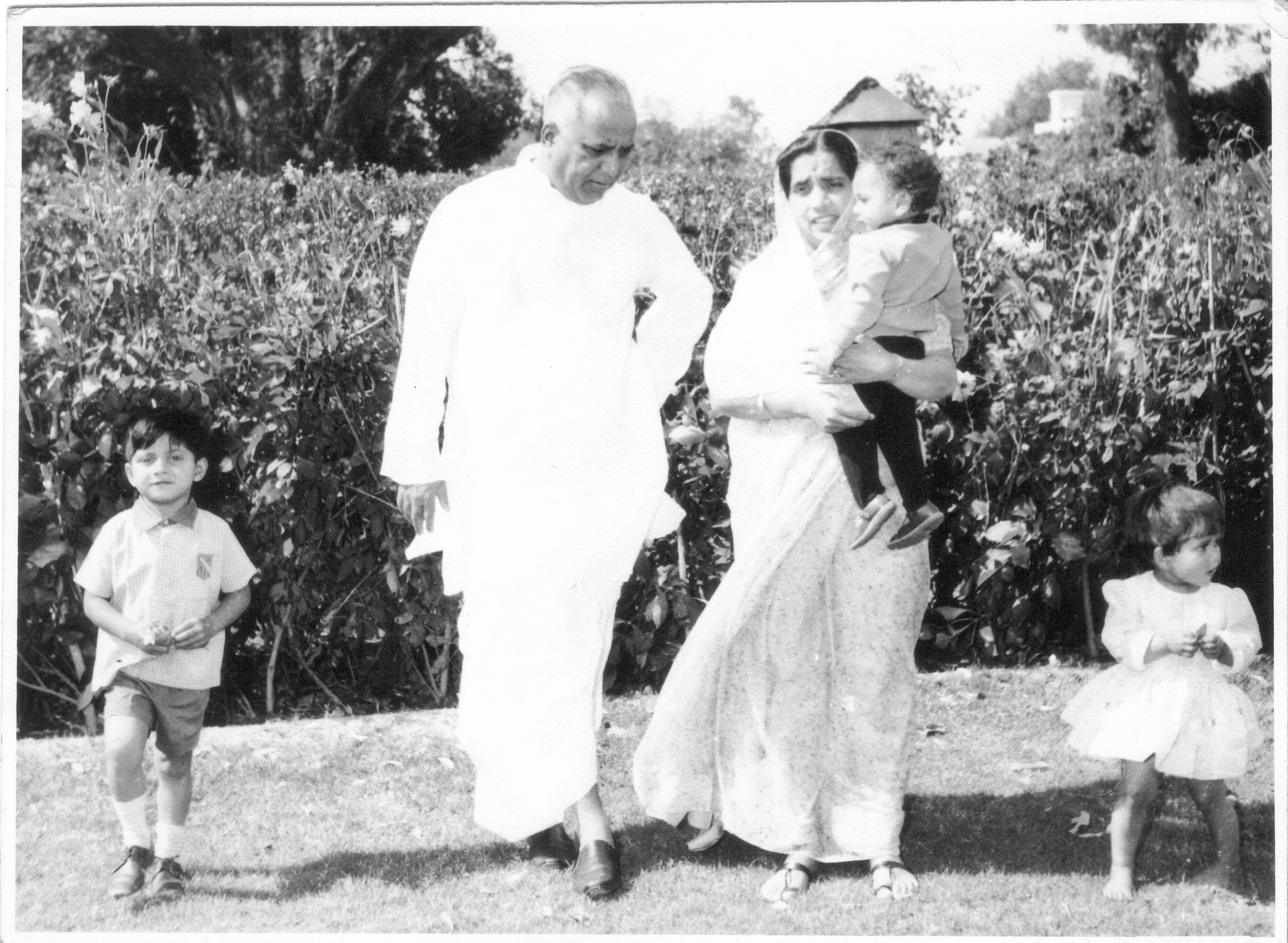
Chavan with his family.

Yashwantrao Balwantrao Chavan (Marathi pronunciation: [jəʃʋənt̪ɾaːʋ t͡səʋʱaːɳ]; 12 March 1913 – 25 November 1984) was an Indian independence activist and politician who served as 5th Deputy Prime Minister of India in the short-lived Charan Singh ministry in 1979. He served as the last Chief Minister of Bombay State and the first of Maharashtra after the latter was created by the division of Bombay State. His also held significant ministerial post was as the 8th Minister of Finance from 1970 to 1971 and from 1971 to 1974.

He was a strong Congress leader, co-operative leader, social activist and writer. He was popularly known as Leader of Common People. He advocated social democracy in his speeches and articles and was instrumental in establishing co-operatives in Maharashtra for the betterment of the farmers.

== Early life ==
Yashwantrao Chavan was born in a Maratha family on 12 March 1913 in the village of Devrashtre in Satara District (now in Sangli District) of Maharashtra, India. He had three siblings. Chavan lost his father in his early childhood and was brought up by his uncle and mother. His mother taught him about self-dependency and patriotism. From childhood, he was fascinated by the freedom struggle of India.

Chavan was an active participant in the struggle for independence of India. As a schoolboy in Karad in 1930, he was fined for his participation in the Non-cooperation Movement led by Mahatma Gandhi. In 1932, he was sentenced to 18 months in prison for hoisting the Indian flag in Satara. During this period, he came in contact with Swami Ramanand Bharti, Dhulappa Bhaurao Navale, Gaurihar (Appasaheb) Sihasane, V. S. Page and Govind Kruparam Wani. Their friendship lasted forever.

After completing his high school education from Tilak High school Karad in 1934, he joined the Rajaram College, Kolhapur. In 1938, after obtaining his B.A. degree in history and political science (awarded by Bombay University) he joined Law College of Pune. After obtaining his law degree (LLB awarded by Bombay University) in 1941, he started practice as a criminal lawyer at Karad. In 1942, he married Venutai at Phaltan in Satara district, in a match arranged by their families.

During his college years, Chavan was involved in many social activities and was closely associated with the Congress party and its leaders, such as Jawaharlal Nehru, Sardar Patel and Keshavrao Jedhe. In 1940, he became President of Satara District Congress. Chavan was one of the delegates at the Bombay session of the A.I.C.C. in 1942 that gave the call for Quit India. He went "underground" before being arrested for his participation in the movement. He spent around two years in jail, and was released only in 1944.

== Political career ==
=== Offices held in the State Government of Bombay ===
In 1946, Yashwantrao was first elected as Member of Legislative Assembly of the Bombay State from the South Satara constituency. In the same year he was appointed parliamentary secretary to the Home Minister of Bombay State. In the next government of Morarji Desai he was appointed Minister of Civil Supplies, Social Welfare and Forests. In 1953 he was a signatory to the Nagpur Pact that assured equitable development of all regions of what is now the state of Maharashtra. The 1950s witnessed the Samyukta Maharashtra Samiti (United Maharashtra Movement) leading struggle for United Maharashtra with Bombay (now Mumbai) as its capital. Chavan never joined the Samyukta Maharashtra Samiti (United Maharashtra Movement) and in fact called Prime Minister Nehru, who opposed formation of language based state reorganization, as "Greater than Maharashtra".

In the 1957 Assembly elections Yashwantrao Chavan was elected from the Karad constituency. This time he was elected as Leader of Congress Legislative Party, and became Chief Minister of the bilingual Bombay state. The election saw the Congress party losing badly in the Marathi speaking areas to the Samyukta Maharashtra Samiti. However, he was able to persuade Nehru to agree to form Maharashtra and therefore he is regarded as the chief architect in the formation of Marathi speaking state of Maharashtra.

On 1 May 1960, Yashwantrao Chavan became the first Chief Minister of Maharashtra. From 1957 to 1960 he also served on the All India Congress Working Committee.

Chavan's vision for Maharashtra for the development envisaged the equal development of both the industrial and agricultural sectors across all the regions of the state. He sought to realize this vision through the co-operative movement. Legislation regarding democratic decentralized bodies and the Agricultural Land Ceiling Act were passed during his tenure as Chief Minister.

=== Roles in Central Government ===
After the resignation of Krishna Menon as Defense Minister in 1962 in the wake of Sino-Indian War, Yashwantrao was given that portfolio by Prime minister Jawaharlal Nehru. In the by-elections in 1962, Chavan was elected unopposed as Member of Parliament from the Nashik parliamentary constituency. He handled the delicate post-war situation firmly and took several decisions to empower the armed forces. He continued to hold the Defense portfolio in the Lal Bahadur Shastri Government during the India–Pakistan war of 1965.

On 14 November 1966, he was appointed Home Minister of India by Prime minister, Indira Gandhi. Yeshwantrao came in for criticism at the time of the first congress split in 1969. He had stuck to his earlier commitment to vote for the official Congress candidate, Sanjeeva Reddy in the presidential elections and in doing so, had invited the ire of Mrs. Indira Gandhi, but later be shifted his ground and supported her. In doing so, he exposed himself to the charge of duplicity and of being a fence-sitter. According to Hatalkar, it might be said in his favour that he had nothing in common with the Syndicate faction of the Congress party but was fully in rapport with Mrs. Gandhi's views, if not her methods, that his prime anxiety was to maintain the unity of the Congress, but that when he found that the split was inevitable, he did not succumb to the blandishments held out before him by some members of the Syndicate.

On 26 June 1970, she appointed him the Finance Minister of India. During his term, Indian economy went into recession for the first time since 1966 and real GDP growth fell by 0.55% in 1972.

He was appointed as the Foreign Minister on 11 October 1974. In June 1975, an Internal State of Emergency was declared in India by the Indira Gandhi Government. This period saw a severe crackdown on leaders and parties opposed to Mrs. Gandhi's rule. Yashwantrao remained in her Government during this period. In the subsequent general elections 1977, the Congress was routed with the party leader and Prime minister, Indira Gandhi herself losing her parliamentary seat. Therefore, in the new Parliament, Chavan was elected the Congress Party Parliamentary leader. As Congress now the biggest opposition party, he became the Leader of opposition.

== Split in Congress ==
The annual session of the Congress party was held in Bengaluru at the end of 1978. On this occasion, the party suffered a split, and two separate political parties emerged, namely Congress (Indira) and Congress (Urs). While the former was led by Indira Gandhi, the latter was led by Devaraj Urs, powerful Chief Minister of Mysore. The other important leaders who joined the Congress Urs were Dev Kant Baruah, Kasu Brahmananda Reddy, Sharad Pawar, A.K. Antony, Sarat Chandra Sinha, Priyaranjan Das Munshi and Yashwantrao Chavan. On the other side, Indira Gandhi's new party included leaders like Shankar Dayal Sharma, Umashankar Dikshit, Chidambaram Subramaniam, Kamruddin Ali Ahmad, Abdul Rehman Antulay and Gulabrao Patil.

Yashwantrao Chavan's political career suffered a major setback following his decision to move away from Indira Gandhi. Devaraj Urs himself soon joined the Janata Party, following which the Congress(Urs) was renamed the Indian Congress (Socialist). Yeshwantrao was appointed as Home Minister and Deputy Prime Minister of India in the short-lived cabinet of Prime Minister Charan Singh in 1979.

In the general elections of January 1980, Congress (I) won a majority in Parliament and came to power under the leadership of Indira Gandhi. In this election, Yashwantrao Chavan was the only candidate elected from Maharashtra as MP on a Congress(S) ticket. In 1981, Yashwantrao was allowed to return to the Indira-led Congress after a six-month wait. Critics at that time commented that the "Fence-sitter has come home to roost".

In 1982, he was appointed the Chairman of the 8th Finance Commission of India. He died in 1984.

== Public office positions held ==
Chavan held many important positions during a long and distinguished career. These included:

Political offices
New office	Chief Minister of Maharashtra; 1960–1962	Succeeded by Marotrao Kannamwar
Preceded by Jawaharlal Nehru	Minister of Defence; 1962–1966	Succeeded by Sardar Swaran Singh
Preceded by Gulzarilal Nanda	Minister of Home Affairs; 1966–1970	Succeeded by Indira Gandhi
Preceded by Indira Gandhi	Minister of Finance; 1970–1974	Succeeded by Chidambaram Subramaniam
Preceded by Sardar Swaran Singh	Minister of External Affairs; 1974–1977	Succeeded by Atal Bihari Vajpayee
Preceded by Charan Singh	Deputy Prime Minister of India; 1979–1980	Succeeded by Chaudhary Devi Lal
Preceded by Jagjivan Ram	Deputy Prime Minister of India; 1979–1980	Succeeded by Chaudhary Devi Lal
Preceded by Hirubhai M. Patel	Minister of Home Affairs; 1979–1980	Succeeded by Zail Singh
Preceded by J.M. Shelat	Chairman, Finance Commission; 1984-84	Succeeded by N.K.P. Salve

== Death and legacy ==
Chavan held all the senior portfolios in the Indian government such as Finance Defence, Home, and External Affairs. His last position was as deputy prime minister in the short lived Charan singh government. He brought important changes in all fields where he held power, he also played crucial role in rebuilding Indian army back after 1962 Sino India War. After his appointment as Defence Minister, he rapidly expanded and modernized military and restored it's dignity which directly helped India in 1971 war. He also played crucial role in 1965 India Pakistan War. Yashwantrao Chavan died of a heart attack on 25 November 1984 in Delhi. He was 71. He was cremated in Karad with full state honours on 27 November and his Samadhi (resting place) is situated at Krishna-Koyna Pritisangam.

- Yashwantrao Chavan holds the record of being the only Maharashtrian leader who held the 4 most important portfolios in the Union government. They are Home, External Affairs, Defence and Finance.
- When Yashwantrao was appointed Federal Defence minister following the China war in 1962, a popular saying arose in Maharashtra- "हिमालयाच्या हाकेला धावला सह्याद्री" ("Himalayachya Hakela Dhavla Sahyadri"), translated in English, Sahyadri (the mountain range that separates Konkan from the Deccan Plateau) came rushing on the call (for help) by the Himalaya.
- During the 1960s and early 70s when Yashwantrao was at the peak of his power and influence, he was called Pratishivaji or New Shivaji.

=== Yashwantrao Chavan Pratishtan (Foundation) ===
- In 1985, soon after his death, Yashwantrao Chavan Pratishtan (Foundation) was established in Bombay.
- In 2010, The Pratishtan instituted a corpus at the Manohar Parrikar Institute for Defence Studies and Analyses (MP-IDSA) for the conduct of an annual Y B Chavan Memorial lecture. Yashwantrao was the founding President of MP-IDSA. The inaugural lecture in 2010 was delivered by Prof. Sunil Khilnani. Prof. Kanti Bajpai, and Ambassador Kanwal Sibal delivered the 2011 and 2012 lectures respectively.

=== Places named after Yashwantrao Chavan ===
- In 1980, Ujjani Back water named Yashwant Sagar on Bhima River village Ujjani in Solapur district.
- In 1984, an engineering college named Yeshwantrao Chavan College of Engineering was established in Nagpur.
- In 1989, an open university named 'Yashwantrao Chavan Maharashtra Open University' was established at Nasik in Maharashtra.
- Rayat Shikshan Sanstha's renowned 'Science College' in Satara was christened as Yashavantrao Chavan Institute of Science, Satara in 1986.
- The expressway between Pune and Mumbai is named after him as are the auditoriums in the Kothrud suburb of Pune, at Nariman Point in Mumbai and the Town Hall in Karad.
- Yashwantrao Chavan Memorial hospital in Sant Tukaram Nagar area of Pimpri is named after him.
- Shivaji University, Kolhapur has established 'Yashwantrao Chavan School of Rural Development'.
- In 2009, the Mumbai Pune Expressway, India's first Express-Way, was named Yashwantrao Chavan Mumbai-Pune Express-Way.
- In 1985, a manmade sanctuary was declared near Devrashtre village, was named as Yashwantrao Chavan Sagreshwar Wildlife Sanctuary

=== Literature ===
Yashwantrao Chavan took a keen interest in literature. He established the Marathi Sahitya Mandal and supported the Marathi Sahitya Sammelan (Conference). He was very closely associated with many poets, editors and several Marathi and Hindi writers. He initiated compilation of Marathi Vishwakosh (a Marathi language encyclopedia). For this, he nominated Lakshman Shastri Joshi as a chairman. He had planned to write his autobiography in three parts. The first part covers his early years in Satara district. Since his native place is situated on the banks of Krishna River he named the first volume as Krishna Kath. His years as the Chief Minister of the bilingual Bombay state and later as that of the newly formed Maharashtra state were spent in Bombay and so the proposed name for the second volume was "Sagar Tir". Later in 1962 he was appointed Defence Minister of India by Nehru. From then he was in Delhi until his death in 1984; so he had proposed the name "Yamuna Kath" for his third volume. He was able to complete and publish only the first volume.

=== In popular culture ===
Yashwantrao Chavan Bakhar Eka Vaadalaachi, a 2014 Indian Marathi-language biographical film by Jabbar Patel covers his role as the Chief Minister of Maharashtra. Ashok Lokhande portrayed the titular role of Chavan.

He was portrayed by Vijay Kashyap in the Indian historical drama web series Rocket Boys (2022–), which chronicles the lives of scientists Homi J. Bhabha and Vikram Sarabhai and highlights Chavan's political support for India's scientific advancements.
