= Malkapur, Kolhapur =

Malkapur
- city
- Location in Maharashtra, India
- Coordinates: 16.93°N 73.92°E
- Country: India
- State: Maharashtra
- District: Kolhapur
- Elevation: 586 m (1,923 ft)

Population (2001)
  - Total: 5,503

Languages
  - Official: Marathi
- Time zone: UTC+5:30 (IST)

For other places with the same name, see Malkapur (disambiguation)

Malkapur is a city and a municipal council in Kolhapur district in the Indian state of Maharashtra.

== Geography ==
Malkapur is located at 16.93°N 73.92°E. It has an average elevation of 586 metres (1922 feet).

== Demographics ==
As of 2001 India census, Malkapur had a population of 5503. Males constitute 51% of the population and females 49%. Malkapur has an average literacy rate of 79%, higher than the national average of 59.5%: male literacy is 84%, and female literacy is 74%. In Malkapur, 12% of the population is under 6 years of age.
