= Karad =

Karad Yashwantnagari
- City
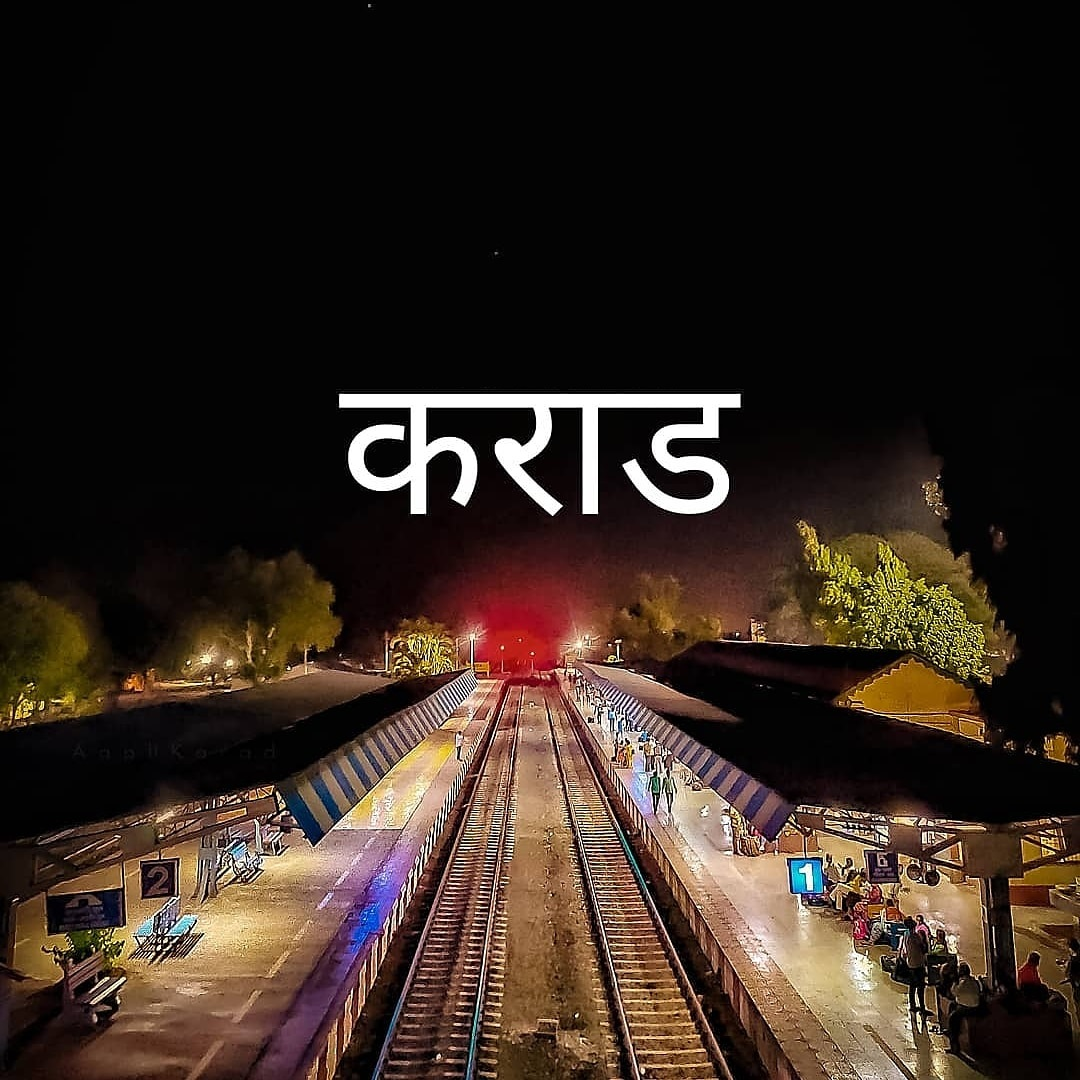
- Karad

- Location in Maharashtra, India
- Coordinates: 17.285°N 74.184°E
- Country: India
- State: Maharashtra
- District: Satara

Government
  - Type: Municipal Council
  - Body: Karad Municipal Council
  - MP: Udayanraje Bhosale (Bhartiya Janata Party)
- Elevation: 670 m (2,200 ft)

Population (2017)
  - Total: 855 00(town + surrounding areas); 117,221 (including Malkapur)
- Demonym: Karadkar
- Time zone: UTC+5:30 (IST)
- PIN: 415110
- Telephone code: 2164
- Vehicle registration: MH-50
- Major Highways: NH-48, NH-166E, NH-266

Karad is a city in Satara district of Indian state of Maharashtra. It is located 302 km (180.19 miles) from Mumbai, 74 km from Sangli and 162 km from Pune. It lies at the confluence of the Koyna River and the Krishna River known as the "Pritisangam". The two rivers originate at Mahabaleshwar, which is around 100 km from Karad. Karad is well known for sugar production and is known as the sugar bowl of Maharashtra owing to the presence of many sugar factories in and around Karad. It is considered an important educational hub in Western Maharashtra due to the presence of many prestigious educational institutes. Karad is resting place of the first chief minister of Maharashtra Yashwantrao Chavan situated at the confluence of the Krishna and Koyana rivers. It is ranked as the cleanest town in Swachh Survekshan 2020 in the category of population with less than 1 lakh. There is demand for formation of karad district along with neighbouring Walva, Shirala, Patan, Palus and Kadegaon talukas.

Karad has an adjoining small town named Malkapur, Karad which has its own municipal council and a population of 86,671. Karad was awarded a prize under "Sant Gadagebaba Gramswachhata Abhiyan" started by Indian Government.

== History ==
It was originally known as "Karhatak", meaning "Elephant Market". Karad is also a city of historical importance. According to Mahabharata, Sahadeva one of the Pandavas lived in the city also known to be pious as Lord Rama stepped his feet on this land. Located to the south west of Karad is Karad Caves, also known as Aghashiv Caves.

The first capital of the Shilaharas was probably at Karad during the reign of Jatiga II as known from their copper plate grant of Miraj and Vikramankadevacharita of Bilhana. Hence sometimes they are referred as 'Shilaharas of Karad'. The capital was later shifted to Kolhapur. Among the Shilaharas of Kolhapur who ruled over Satara and Belagavi districts from 1000 to 1215 A. D., Gonka deserves mention here, as he is described as the Lord of Karhad (Karad), Mairifvja (Miraj) and Konkan.

== Geography ==
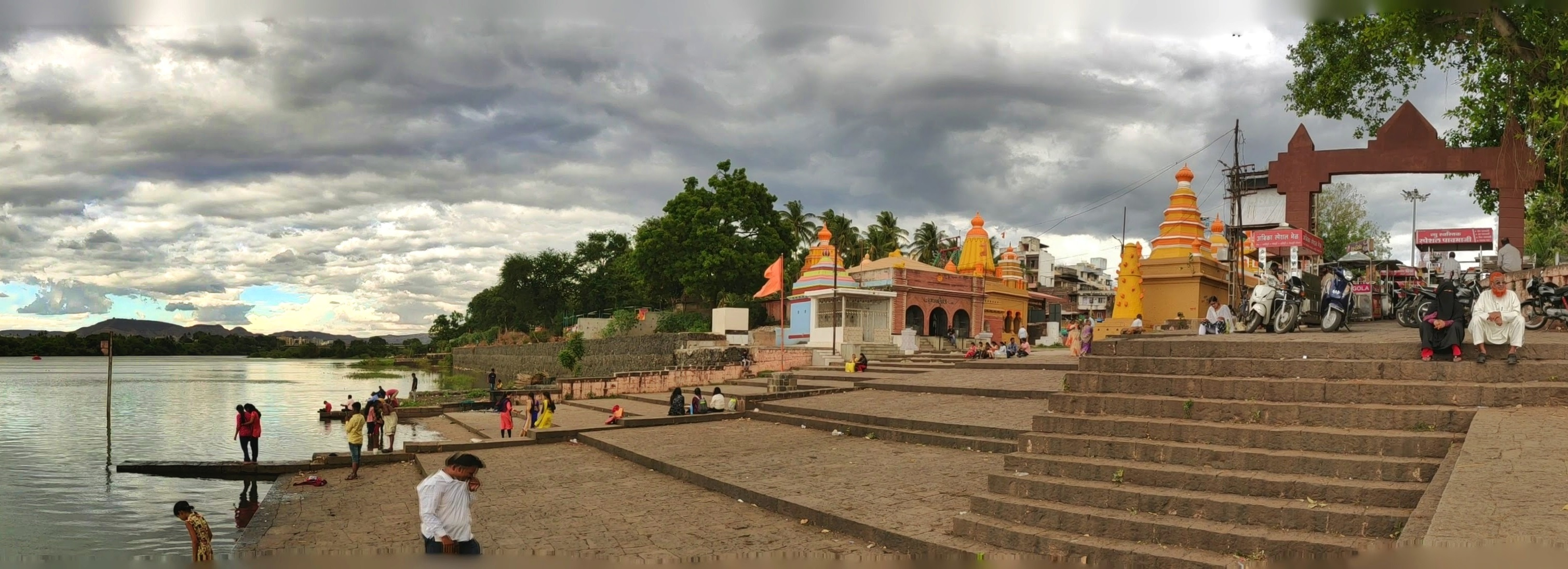
Krishna Ghat

Karad is located at 17.28°N 74.2°E. It has an average elevation of 566 metres (1857 feet).

Five kilometres southwest of Karad are the Karad Caves, which contain early Buddhist symbols.

== Nearest Cities ==
- Satara: 51 km
- Pune: 162 km
- Sangli : 74 km
- Mumbai : 302 km
- Kolhapur : 64 km

== Tourism ==
Tourist places in and around Karad are: (Distance in Km)

- Preeti Sangam (Krishna-Koyna Confluence) – 2 km
- Krishnamai Temple – 2 km
- Pritisangam Udyan – 2 km
- Late Yashwantrao Chavan's Samadhi – 2 km
- Historical Monument 'Manore' (2 Minars) – 2 km
- Naktya Ravlyachi Vihir (Ancient Well) – 2 km
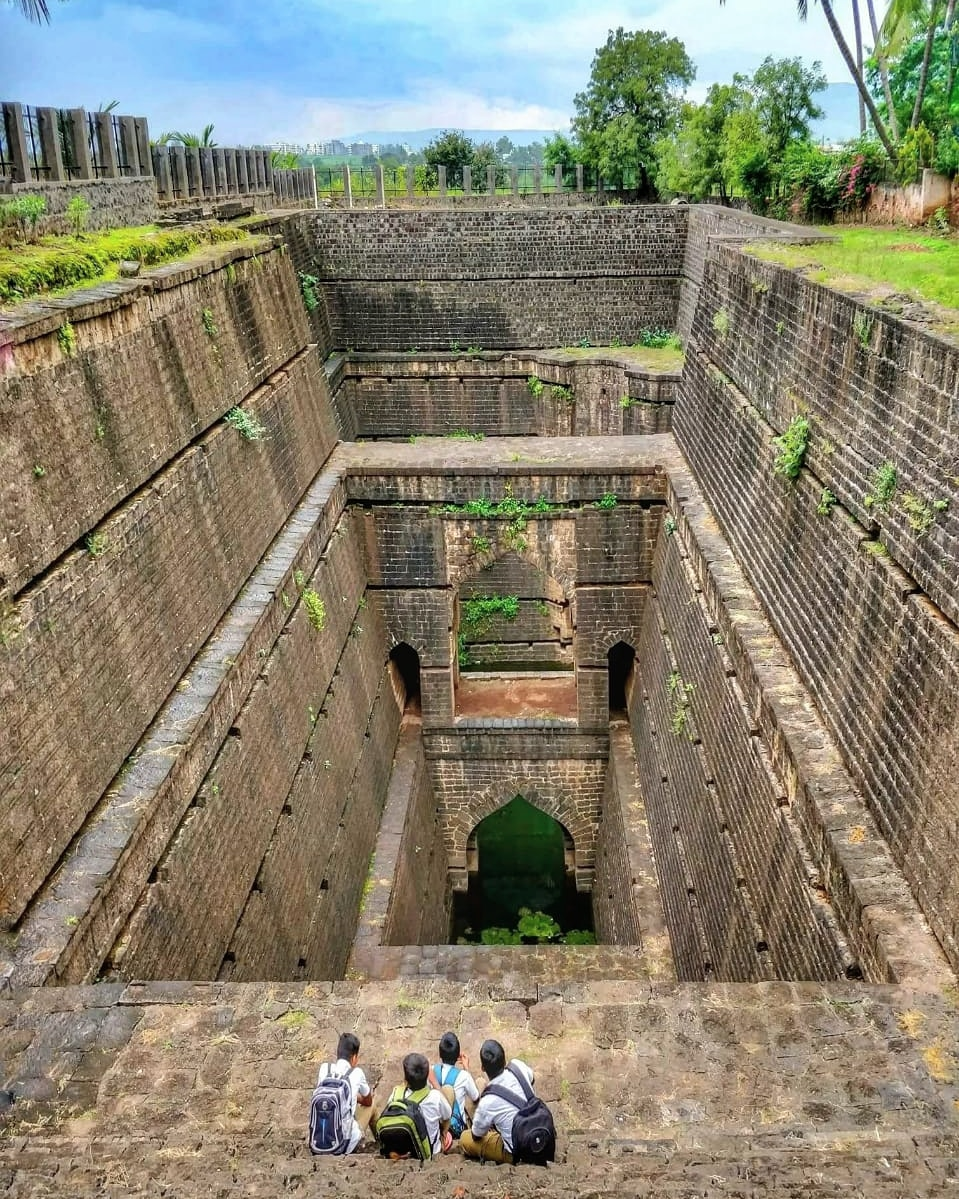
  Naktya Rawalchi Vihir (Ancient Step Well)
- Masjid Built by Sultan Ali Adilshah (1557- 1580) – 2 km
- Sadashivgad – 5 km
- Khodashi Dam – 5 km
- Agashiv Caves – 5 km
- Vasantgad – 15 km
- Talbeed (Ram Mandir) – 15 km
- Sar-Senapati Hambirrao Mohite Samadhi – 15 km
- Chauranginath Temple, Sonsal – 20 km
- Ramling Bet, Bahe – 30 km
- Shri Khandoba Devsthan, Pal – 30 km
- Ram Mandir Chaphal – 30 km
- Yamai Mandir, Aundh – 35 km
- Uttarmand Dam – 35 km
- Sagareshwar Wildlife Sanctuary Palus – 30 km
- Valmiki Temple – 45 km
- Chandoli National Park Shirala – 49 km
- Chandoli Dam Shirala – 50 km
- Koyna Dam – 60 km
- Nawja Waterfall – 65 km

== Cityscape ==
The city has many important government offices and other institutions of significance. With the vision of great leader P. D. Patil the city was one of the few in India to have a well- planned underground drainage system well before in the 1960s. By end-2010, Malkapur, Karad, on the outskirts of the city of Karad, is delivering water 24x7 to all its residents as a result of concrete steps taken by the Malkapur Nagar Panchayat (MNP) with support from the Maharashtra Jeevan Pradhikaran (MJP), a state government entity. This is the first of its kind by a public body in India. Major offices and institutions in Karad are as follows:

- Karad Court, Karad
- Diwani -Foujdari Court, Karad
- Doordarshan Kendra, Karad
- Fire- Brigade, Karad
- Division Office, Karad
- Tehsil Office, Karad
- Khashaba Chounk
- Panchayat Samiti, Karad
- Government Rest House, Karad
- City Police Station, Karad
- Taluka Police Station, Karad
- Head Post Office, Karad
- Railway Station, Karad
- Airport, Karad
- MSRTC Depot, Karad
- Cottage Hospital, Karad
- RTO Office, Karad
- Taswade MIDC, Karad
- Nagarpalika, Karad
- Town Hall, Karad

== Demographics ==
As of 2011 India census, Karad town and surrounding villages had total population of 74,355. Males constitute 52% of the population and females 48%. Karad has an average literacy rate of 76%, higher than the national average of 59.5%: male literacy is 80%, and female literacy is 72%. In Karad, 11% of the population is under 6 years of age. Vast majority of people belong to Hinduism and Speak Marathi language.

== Transportation ==
=== National Highways ===
The National Highway 48 (formerly National Highway 4) goes through the Karad city. National Highway 48 (NH 48) is a major National Highway in Western and Southern India. NH 48 links four of the 10 most populous Indian cities - Mumbai, Bengaluru, Chennai and Pune. NH 48 also connects Karad to Uran Islampur, Kolhapur. Pune is the largest metropolis near Karad and Kolhapur, Sangli is an important trade centre and Karad is educational hub for IIT training and a tourist destination.

=== Airport ===
An Airstrip was constructed in the 1955 by the Public Works Department to facilitate the Koyna dam project. It is currently being used for General aviation and pilot training. The airport is spread on 65 acres and the acquisition of more than 100 acres has been proposed. Runway 10/28 is 1280 meters long and 30 meters wide with a 60 meter by 60 meter apron. No navigational aids nor night landing facilities are available on the airstrip. The State run Maharashtra Airport Development Company (MADC) plans to extend the 1,250 meters airstrip by another 1,500 m and widen it by 150 m. Besides this the nearest airports are Pune Airport and Kolhapur Airport.

=== Railways ===
- Karad – 4 km from city

Karad has railway station situated near ogalewadi about 04 km distance on the Karad Vita road from Karad Bus stand. Karad is on route from Mumbai to Miraj, Sangli, Kolhapur, and Benguluru (some trains). You can reach Karad from Mumbai or Pune easily by road or rail (Mahalaxmi Express, Koyna Express,"Goa Express", Sahyadri Express, Sharavati Express, Dadar–Puducherry Chalukya Express or Dadar–Tirunelveli Chalukya Express).

Railway Minister Suresh Prabhu has allocated funds for a plan to build a new 112 km railway line between Karad and Chiplun.

Nearest railway junction

- Miraj – 72 km

The nearest major railhead is Miraj Junction, served by express trains including the Karnataka Sampark Kranti Express and the Rani Chennamma Express. MSRTC operates bus services between Miraj and Karad.

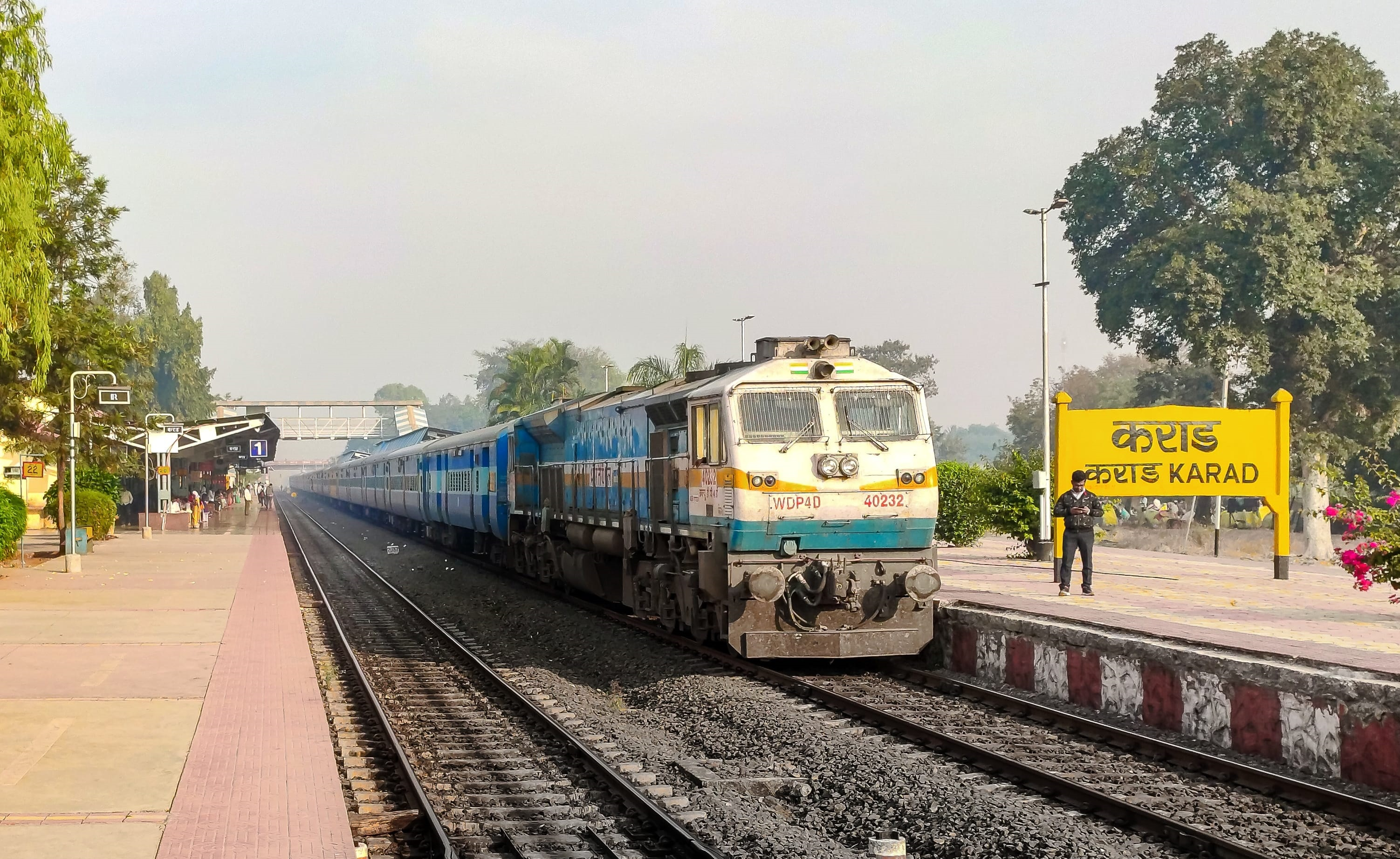
Karad Railway Station

Railway Time Table Karad

Towards Miraj - Kolhapur - Hubballi

No.	Train No.	Train Name	Train Type	Day	Departure time
01	01023	Pune – Kolhapur	Pune - Kolhapur Special	Daily	01.37 Am
02	11097	Pune – Ernakulam	Poorna Express	Sun	02.25 Am
03	17318	Dadar - Hubballi	Hubballi Express	Daily	03.35 Am
04	17411	Mumbai - Kolhapur	Mahalaxmi Express	Daily	04.05 Am
05	11021	Dadar - Tirunelveli	Tirunelveli Express	Sun, Wed, Thu	04.45 Am
06	11035	Dadar – Mysore	Sharavati Express	Fri	04.45 Am
07	11005	Dadar - Puducherry	Puducherry Express	Mon, Tue, Sat	04.45 Am
08	16209	Ajmer – Mysore	All Mysore Express	Mon, Sat	05.40 Am
09	16505	Gandhidham – Bangalore	GIMB SBC Bangalore Express	Wed	05.40 Am
10	16507	Jodhpur – Bangalore	JU SBC Bangalore Express	Sun, Fri	05.40 Am
11	16531	Ajmer – Bangalore	SBC Garib Nawaz Express	Tue	05.40 Am
12	71441	Satara – Kolhapur	Demu	Daily	06.25 Am
13	11040	Gondia – Kolhapur	Maharashtra Express	Daily	07.50 Am
14	16554	Mumbai – Bangalore	LTT-SMVB Express	Mon, Tue	06.52 Am
15	12148	Nizamuddin – Kolhapur	Nizamuddin Express	Fri	10.15 Am
16	12782	Nizamuddin – Mysore	Swarnajayani Express	Tue	10.15 Am
17	20475	Bikaner – Miraj	Bikaner Express	Tue	11.15 Am
18	51409	Pune – Kolhapur	Demu	Daily	03.56 Pm
19	11028	Satara – Dadar	Dadar Express (Pandharpur)	Mon, Tue, Sat	04.25 Pm
20	11029	Mumbai – Kolhapur	Koyna Express	Daily	05.10 Pm
21	20674	Pune – Kolhapur	Vande Bharat Express	Sun, Wed, Fri	05.20 Pm
22	12780	Nizamuddin – Vasco	Goa Express	Daily	08.45 Pm
23	17364	Yog Rishikesh – Hubbali	YNRK -Hubbali Express	Fri	10.40 Pm
24	12494	Nizamuddin –Miraj	Darshan Express	Sat	10.40 Pm
			11023 Sahyadri Express >> Discontinued		
			Information by (Basargi) : updated In July 2026		

Towards Satara - Pune - Mumbai

No.	Train No.	Train Name	Train Type	Day	Departure time
01	01024	Kolhapur – Pune	Pune - Kolhapur Special	Daily	02.10 Am
02	17363	Hubballi – Yog Rishikesh	Hubballi -YNRK Express (Haridwar)	Tue	04.10 Am
03	12493	Miraj - Nizamuddin	Darshan Express	Sun	06.40 Am
04	11426	Kolhapur – Pune	Demu	Daily	07.52 Am
05	20673	Kolhapur – Pune	Vande Bharat	Mon, Thu, Sat	10.05 Am
06	11027	Dadar - Satara	Satara Express	Mon, Tue, Sat	12.35 Pm
07	11030	Kolhapur – Mumbai	Koyna Express	Daily	10.50 Am
08	16553	Bangalore – Mumbai	LTT-SMVB Express	Wed, Sun	12.05 Pm
09	12147	Kolhapur – Nizamuddin	Nizamuddin Express	Tue	11.40 Am
10	12781	Mysore – Nizamuddin	Swarnajayani Express	Sat	11.40 Am
11	16210	Mysore – Ajmer	Ajmer Express	Wed, Fri	02.10 Pm
12	16506	Bangalore – Gandhidham	Gandhidham Express	Sun	02.10 Pm
13	16508	Bangalore - Jodhpur	Jodhpur Express	Tue, Thu	02.10 Pm
14	16532	Bangalore – Ajmer	Garib Nawaz Express	Sat	02.10 Pm
15	20476	Miraj -Bikaner	Bikaner Express	Tue	03.50 Pm
16	11039	Kolhapur - Gondia	Maharashtra Express	Daily	05.35 Pm
17	11098	Ernakulam – Pune	Poorna Express	Tue	06.50 Pm
18	51442	Kolhapur – Satara	Demu Special	Daily	08.16 Pm
19	11006	Puducherry - Dadar	Puducherry-Chalukya Express	Mon, Wed, Thu	10.00 Pm
20	11022	Tirunelveli - Dadar	Tirunelveli Express	Tue, Fri, Sat	10.00 Pm
21	11036	Mysore – Dadar	Sharavati Express	Sun	10.00 Pm
22	17317	Hubballi - Dadar	Dadar -Hubballi Express	Daily	10.45 Pm
23	11012	Kolhapur - Mumbai	Mahalaxmi Express	Daily	11.15 Pm
24	12779	Vasco – Nizamuddin	Goa Express	Daily	11.58 Pm
			11024 Sahyadri Express >> Discontinued		
			Information by (Basargi): Updated In July 2026		

== Culture ==
=== Performing arts ===
The city has a major hall for cultural activities and exhibitions: Yashwantrao Chavan Memorial - Town Hall. Cultural events of various organizations and gatherings of schools are also held here. The "Venutai Chavan Hall" is used for classical concerts, conducting national and international seminars on topics like science, space, traditions, culture, spirituality, etc.

=== Literature ===
Karad has a tradition of literature lovers. The prestigious 76th Akhil Bharatiya Marathi Sahitya Sammelan was held at banks of Krishna river in Karad in 2003.

== Education ==
The Government College of Engineering, Karad (est. 1960) is one of India's oldest post-independence institutions awarding engineering graduate and post-graduate degrees.

== Notable people ==
- Gopal Ganesh Agarkar (1856–1895), social reformer and newspaper editor born in Tembhu.
- Khashaba Jadhav (15 January 1926 – 14 August 1984) Born in a very poor farming family at Goleshwar Tal. Karad, the only individual Olympic Medal Winner for India until 2000. He won India's first individual Olympic medal by winning the Bronze medal on 23 July 1952, in the 1952 Helsinki Olympic Games for wrestling in bantamweight, which is the unbeaten record for India in wrestling until today. In 1993, Maharashtra State awarded him the Shiv Chhattrapati Award posthumously. In 2001, the Central Government also awarded him the Arjuna Award posthumously.
- Yashwantrao Chavan (12 March 1913 – 25 November 1984), an eminent Congress party politician, hailed from Karad. He was the first Chief Minister of Maharashtra and also served as the defence minister, finance minister, home minister, foreign affairs minister, and as the Deputy Prime Minister of India and became the first and only person from Maharashtra to hold this political post.
- Prithviraj Chavan: He was the 17th Chief Minister of Maharashtra. Chavan served as the Minister of State in the Prime Minister's Office in the Ministry of Parliamentary Affairs and Ministry of Personnel, Public Grievances, and Pensions. Chavan was also General Secretary of the All-India Congress Committee (AICC), in-charge of many states, including Jammu and Kashmir, Karnataka, Haryana, Gujarat, Tripura, and Arunachal Pradesh.
