= Malikpur, Jhajjar =

Malikpur
- Village
- Location in Haryana, India Malikpur (India)
- Country: India
- State: Haryana
- Region: North India
- District: Jhajjar

Languages
  - Official: Hindi
- Time zone: UTC+5:30 (IST)
- PIN: 124106
- Website: haryana.gov.in

Malikpur is a village in Jhajjar district in Haryana state, India. It is located 12 kilometres (7.5 mi) from Beri, 19 kilometres (12 mi) to the west from Jhajjar, and 274 kilometres (170 mi) from the state capital Chandigarh.

Postal head office is Matanhail.

== Nearby villages ==
- Paharipur 3 kilometres (1.9 mi)
- Achhej 3 kilometres (1.9 mi)
- Dubaldhan 6 kilometres (3.7 mi)
- Palra 6 kilometres (3.7 mi)
- Dubal Dhan Bidhan 7 kilometres (4.3 mi)

== Demography ==
As of 2011 India census, Malikpur population was 1736 and the number of houses was 356. Women formed 46.8% of the population. Overall literacy rate was 71.0%, however female literacy rate was only 28.0%.
