= Karad Caves =

Buddhist cave in Maharashtra, India

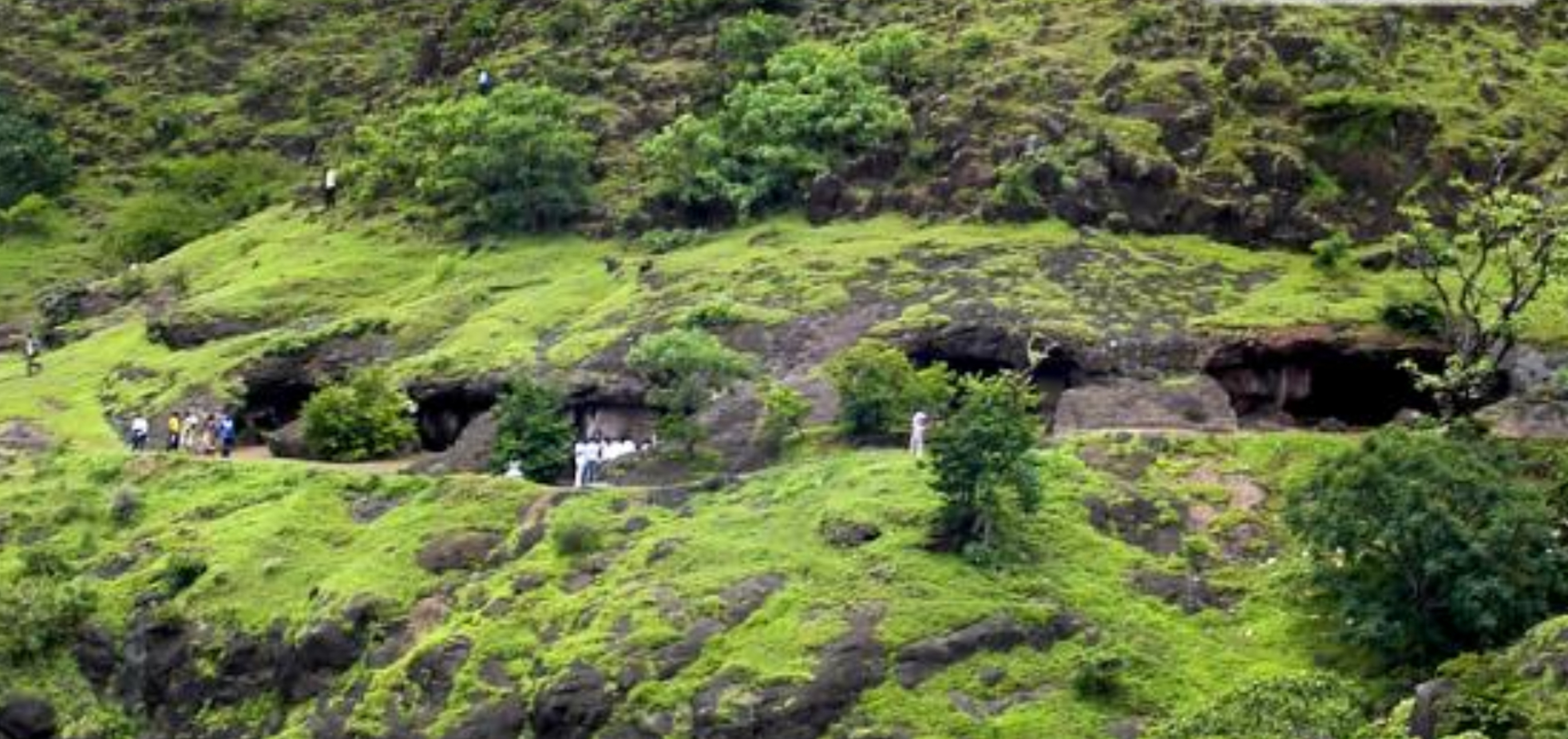
- Karad caves, Agashiv Leni.

- Location within India Location within Maharashtra
- Coordinates: 17.2352778°N 74.1522222°E

The Karad Caves form a group of 66 Buddhist caves located about 5 kilometers south west of Karad, near the village Jakhinwadi overlooking the Koyna River. They are composed of:

- Agashiv Caves 17.2352778°N 74.1522222°E
- Bhairav Caves 17.239268°N 74.148289°E
- Dongrai Caves 17.2551854°N 74.1634643°E)

The caves are located on Agashiv hill and some caves are scattered around Jakhinwadi. The caves facing south are important caves. There are caves in the valley as well. One of the caves is named after Chokhamela who lived there for about 8 years.

These caves are carved in first century BC and are very simple.

- Cave 5 – have earliest Buddhist symbols
- Cave 30- Buddhist symbols

The inscription describes the gift by Sanghmitra, Son of Gopala.

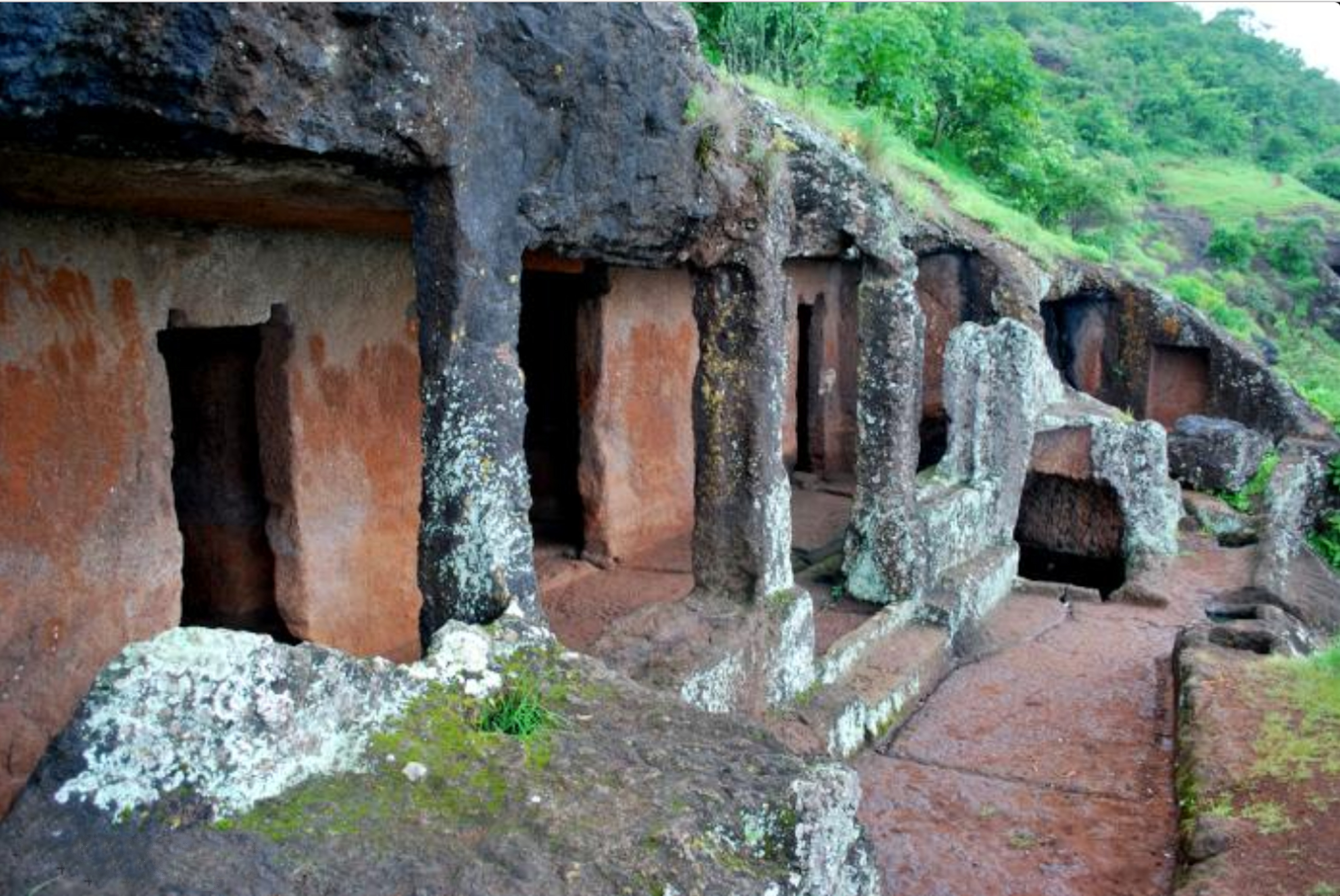
Karad caves, Dongrai Leni.

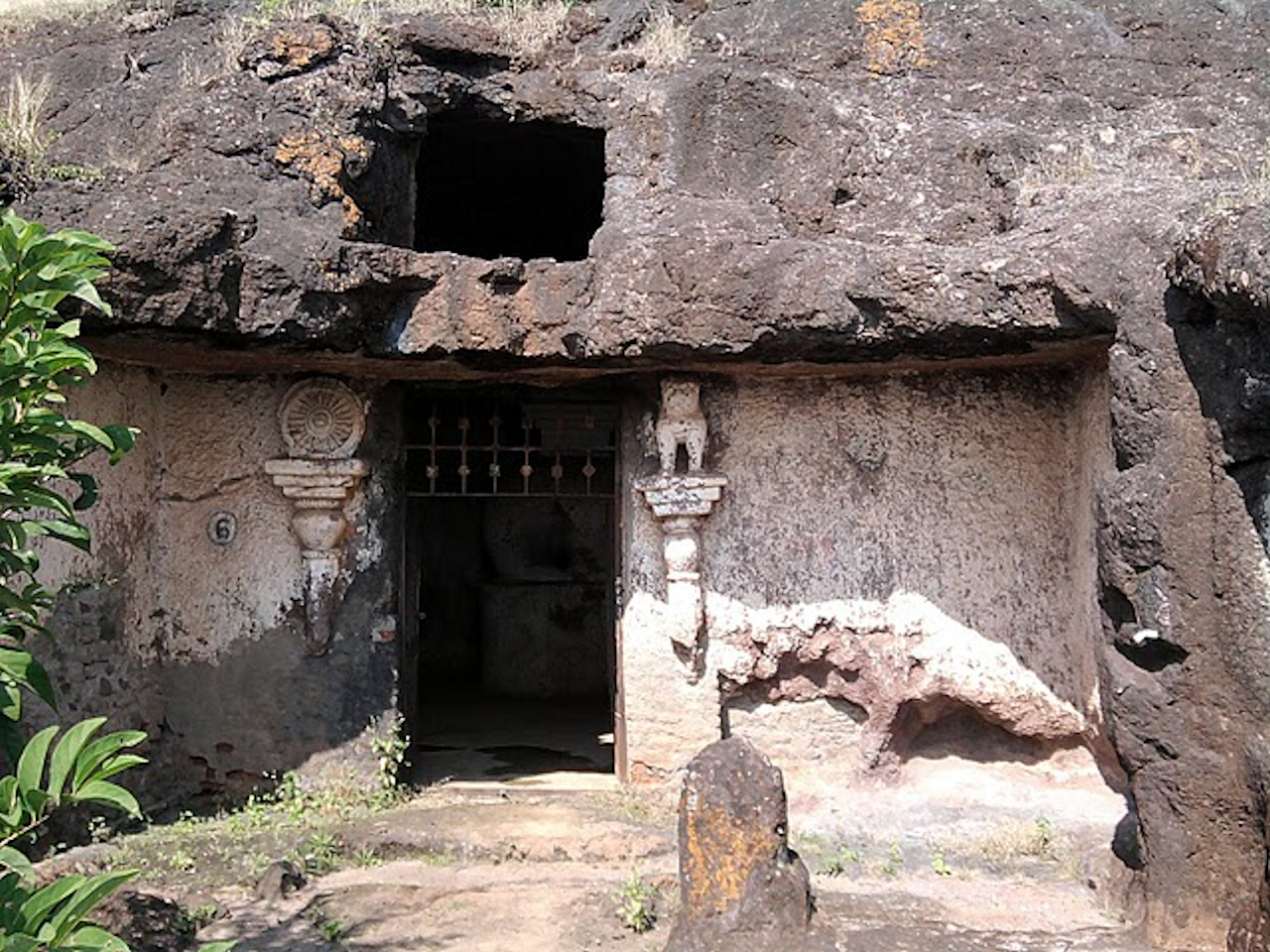
Karad caves, one of the Agashiv Caves.

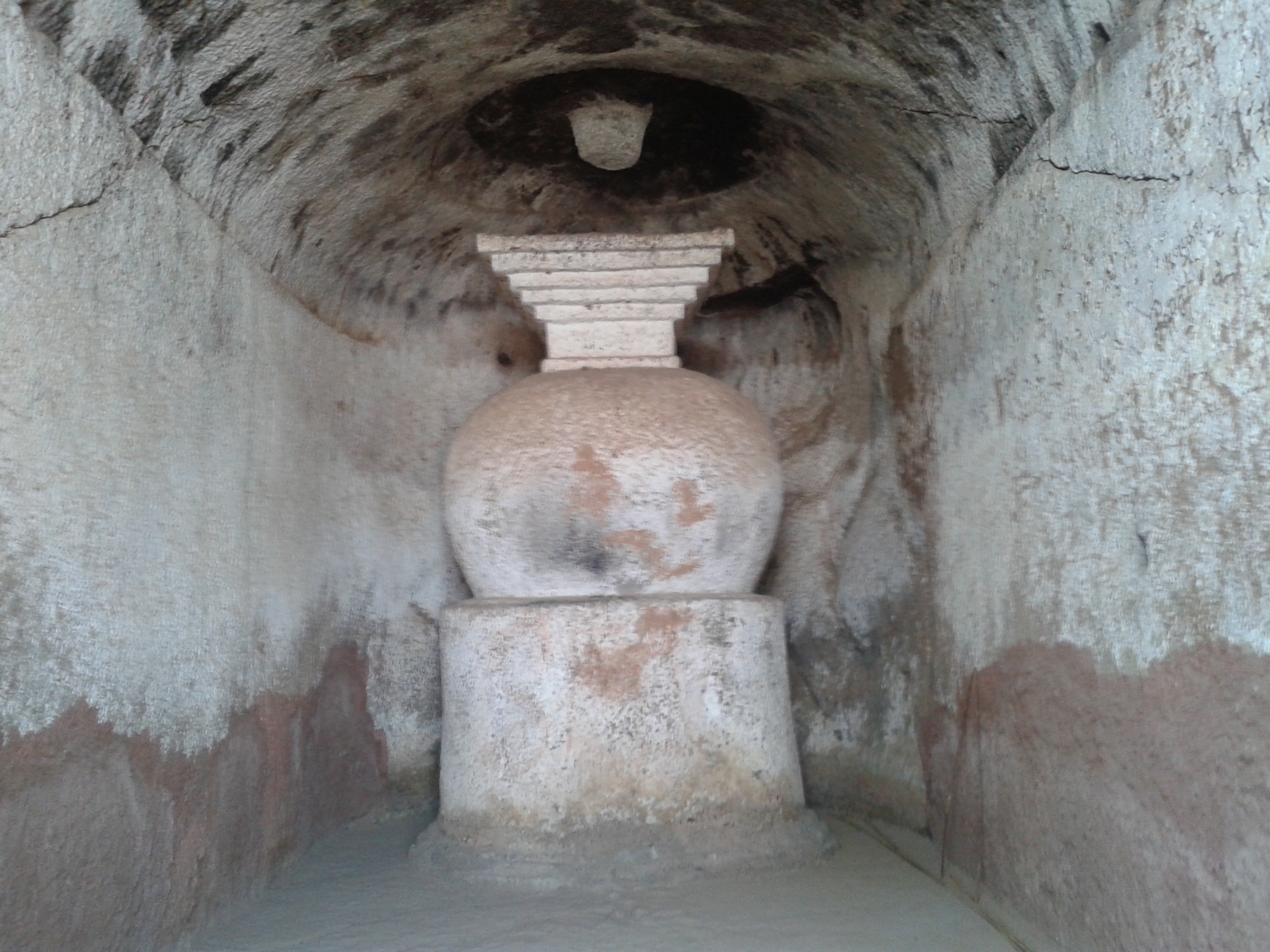
Buddhist cave 7, Jakhinwadi, Karad

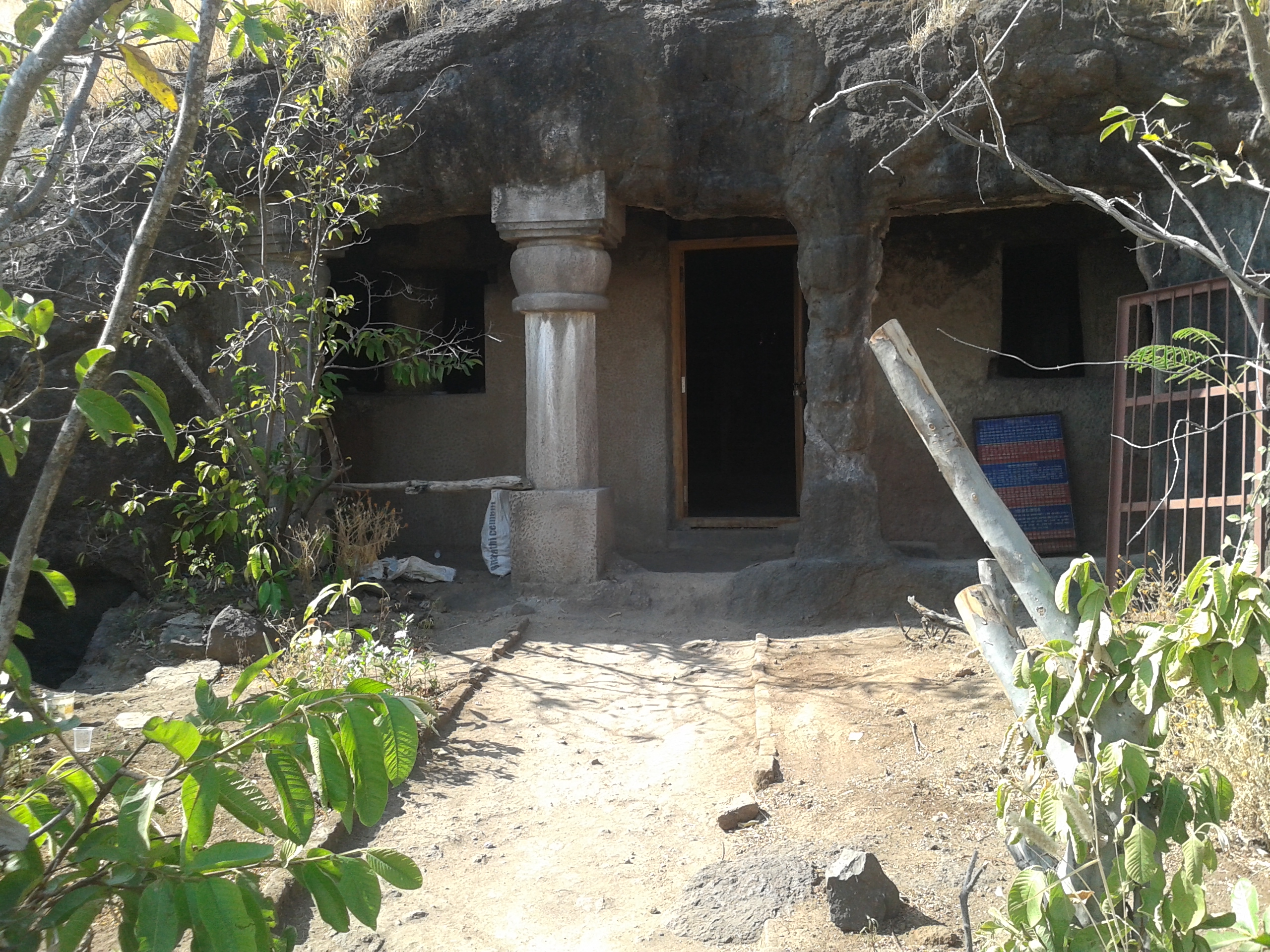
Buddhist Cave 9, Jakhinwadi, Karad.
