= Malkapur Municipal Council =

Municipal council in Satara district, Maharashtra

Type
- Type: Municipal Council
- Seats: 19

Elections
- Last election: 28-January-2019

Malkapur is the municipal council in Satara district, Maharashtra.

== History ==
Malkapur is a Municipal Council city in Satara district, Maharashtra. The Malkapur city is divided into 20 wards for which elections are held every 5 years. The Jamner Municipal Council has population of 46,762 of which 24,270 are males while 22,492 are females as per report released by Census India 2011.

== Municipal Council election ==
=== Electoral performance 2019 ===
S.No.	Party name	Alliance	Party flag or symbol	No. of Corporators
01	Shiv Sena (SS)	NDA		00
02	Bharatiya Janata Party (BJP)	NDA		05
03	Indian National Congress (INC)	UPA		14
04	Nationalist Congress Party (NCP)	UPA		00
