= Koyna =

Koyna may refer to:

- Koyna River, a river which originates in the Western Ghats of Maharashtra
- Koyna Wildlife Sanctuary, a wildlife refuge in the Western Ghats of Maharashtra
- Koynanagar, a town at the site of the Koyna Dam
- Koyna Dam, a dam on Koyna River
- Koyna Hydroelectric Project, hydroelectric project associated with the Koyna River and dam
- Koyna (harvestman), an arachnid genus in the Assamiidae family of harvestman
