= Koynanagar =

- Town
- Location in Maharashtra, India
- Coordinates: 17.4°N 73.76°E
- Country: India
- State: Maharashtra
- District: Satara
- Elevation: 746 m (2,448 ft)

Population (2001)
  - Total: 28,091

Languages
  - Official: Marathi
- Time zone: UTC+5:30 (IST)
- PIN: 415207
- Telephone code: 02372
- Vehicle registration: MH-50

Koynanagar is a town in Maharashtra, India. It is situated on the Chiplun-Sangli state highway on the banks of Koyna River. The town is small but famous for Koyna Dam and the Koyna Hydroelectric Project which is the largest completed hydroelectric project of India. An earthquake in 1967 flattened the city and left 180 people dead.

Koyna Nagar is nestled in the Western Ghats, about 746 m (2,448 ft) above sea level, and hence has a tolerable climate for most of the year.
