= N. G. Krishna Murti =

Indian civil engineer (1910–1995)

- Born: 10 February 1910; Bapatla, Andhra Pradesh, India
- Died: 24 February 1995 (aged 85); Mumbai, Maharashtra, India
- Occupation: Civil engineer
- Known for: Koyna Hydroelectric Project; Bhakra Dam Management Board
- Awards: 1963 Padma Shri; 1972 Padma Bhushan

Nori Gopala Krishna Murti (10 February 1910 – 24 February 1995) was an Indian civil engineer, known for his contributions for the implementation of Koyna Hydroelectric Project. He was the chairman of Bhakra Dam Management Board and the vice-chairman of the International Congress on Large Dams. The Government of India awarded him the Padma Shri, the fourth highest civilian award, in 1963. He received the Padma Bhushan, the third highest civilian award, in 1972.

== Biography ==
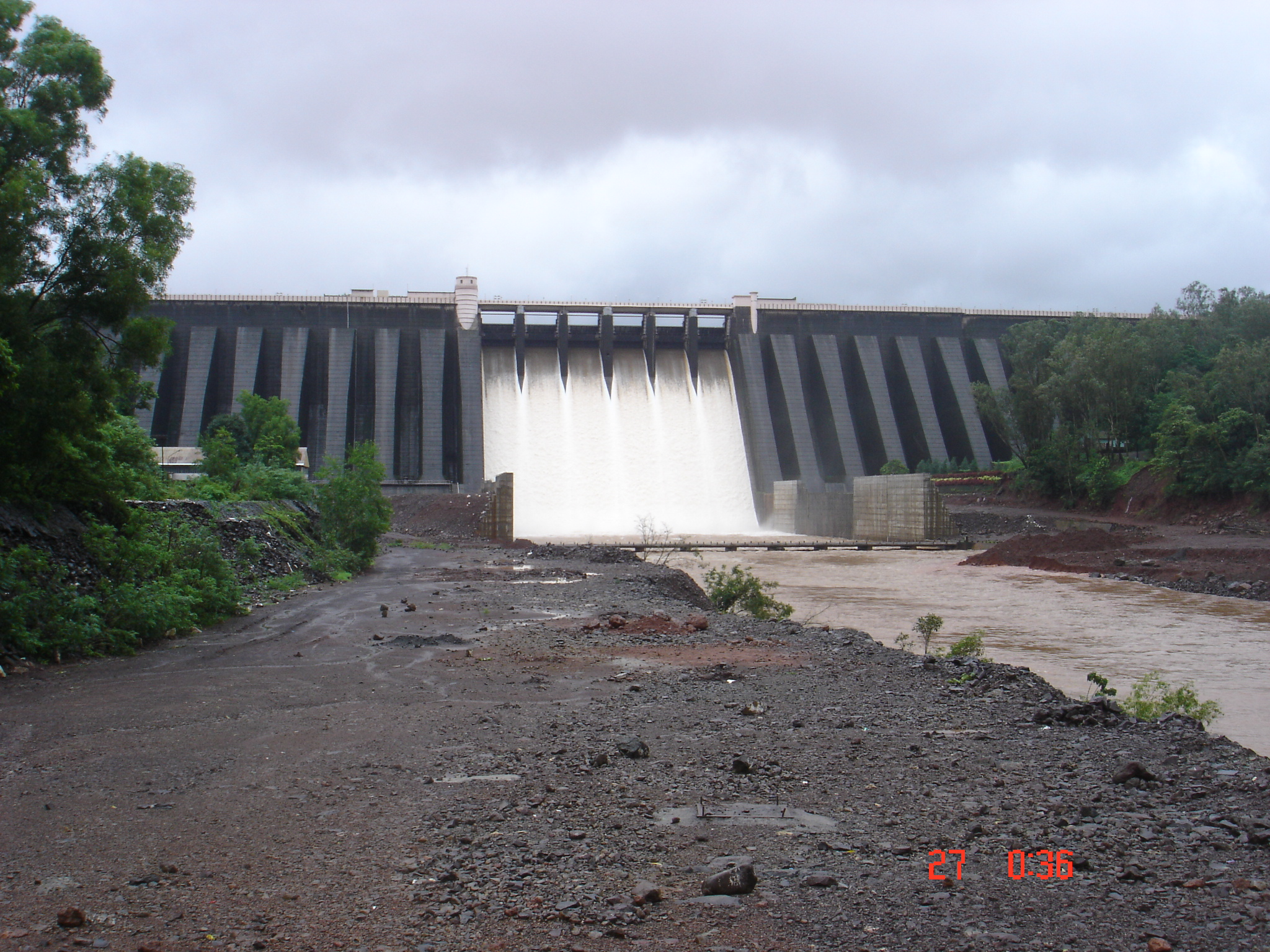
Koyna dam

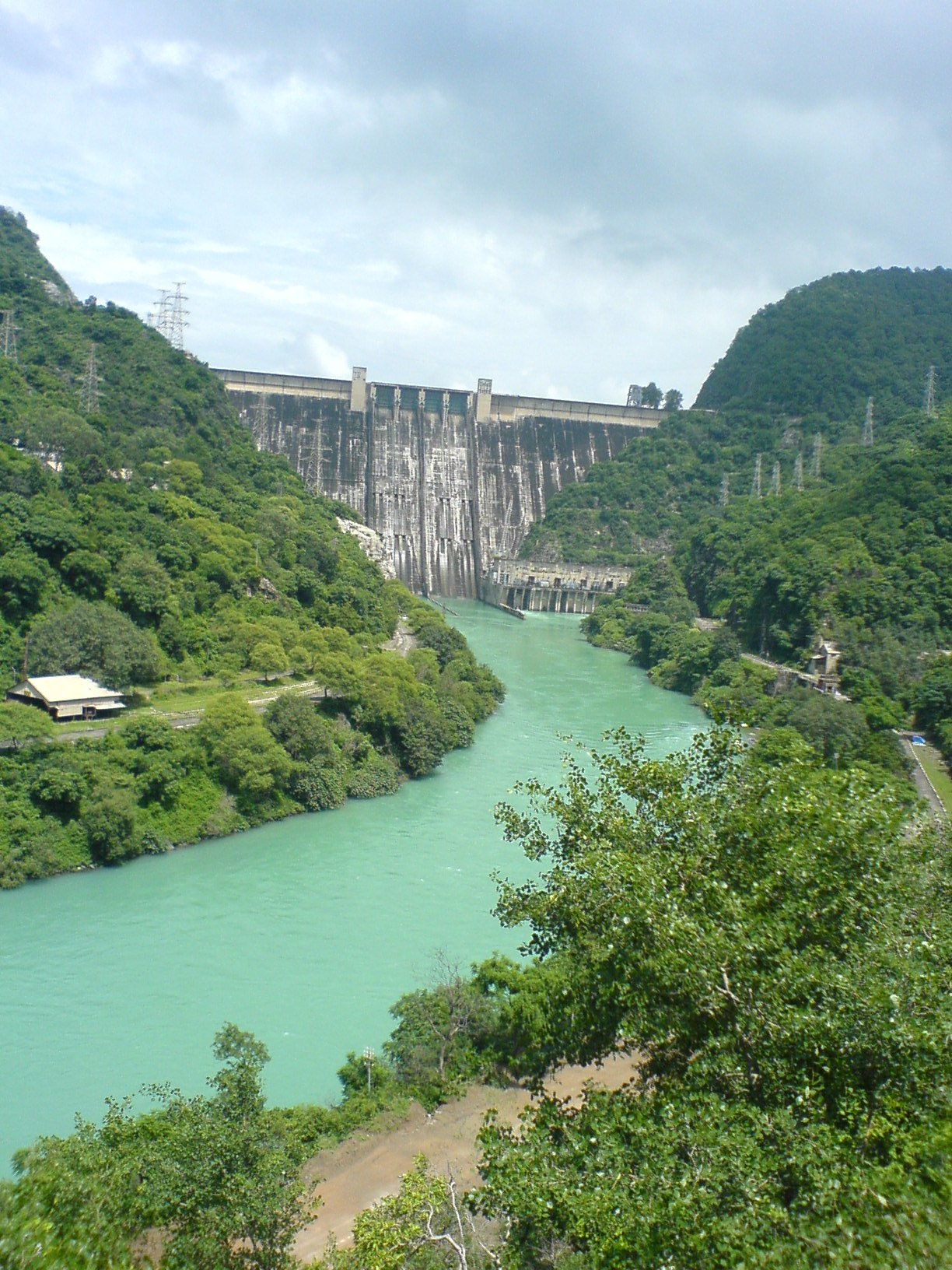
Bhakra Dam

Krishna Murti was born on 16 February 1910 at Bapatla in the south Indian state of Andhra Pradesh to Venkateswarlu Nori–Sundaramma couple and did his early education at Bapatla Board School. As a civil engineer in the Government service, he was involved in the development of a number of dams and airports in India. The most notable among his achievements was the designing, implementation and commissioning of Koyna Hydroelectric Project. He also served as the chairman of the Bhakranangal Dam Management Board and was the vice-chairman of the International Congress on Large Dams (ICLD) from 1969 to 1972.

Murti, who was married to Sundararamaratnam, died in 1995, at the age 85. Nori Pandurang Vithal, erstwhile chief commissioner of railway safety of the Indian Railways and Vasudev Nori, both civil engineers, were his sons.

== Awards and honors ==
Krishna Murti received the Padma Shri, the fourth highest civilian award from the Government of India in 1963. The Government honored him again in 1972 with the third highest award of the Padma Bhushan.

== See also ==
- Hydroelectric power in India
- List of conventional hydroelectric power stations
