= Janardan Bapurao Bothe =

Indian social worker (born 1939)

- Citizenship: India
- Occupation: Social worker
- Awards: Padma Shri (2026)

Janardan Bapurao Bothe (born 1939) is an Indian social worker who works for rural upliftment. He was awarded the 2026 Padma Shri in Social Work.

== Life ==
Janardan Bapurao Bothe was born in 1939 in Washim district of present-day Maharashtra. He was part of the Seva Mandal while he was a student. He later became a full-time sevak.

Bothe served as a close aide to Tukdoji Maharaj and was his personal secretary, accompanying Tukdoji Maharaj on his programmes and tours across India.

During the 1962 Sino-Indian War, Bothe helped boost morale of the Indian armed forces deployed at the North-East Frontier Agency border by participating in bhajan programmes.

He founded the Rashtra Sant Shri Tukdoji Maharaj Shikshan Sanstha in 1972 to set up schools and hostels for tribals and the underprivileged across Maharashtra. This impacted thousands of students from Dalit, Adivasi or economically weaker sections.

As part of the Seva Mandal, Bothe led more than 10,000 youth organisations, women's groups and rural branches focusing on environmental conservation, value-based education, rural development, de-addiction and health awareness.

As of 2026, he is the general secretary of the All India Shri Gurudev Seva Mandal at the Gurukunj Ashram, which was founded by Tukdoji Maharaj.

== Awards and accolades ==
In 1992, he was awarded the Dr Babasaheb Ambedkar Dalit Mitra Sanstha Award. In 2008, he won the Maratha Vidarbha Bhushan Award. He was awarded the Padma Shri in social work in 2026.
