= Radhanagari Wildlife Sanctuary =

Wildlife sanctuary in India

- राधानगरी अभयारण्य
- IUCN category IV (habitat/species management area)
- Location within Maharashtra Location within India
- Interactive map of Radhanagari Wildlife Sanctuary
- Location: Kolhapur district, Maharashtra, India
- Nearest city: Kolhapur 46 kilometres (29 mi) NE
- Coordinates: 16°23.09′0″N 73°57.32′0″E
- Area: 351.16 square kilometres (135.58 sq mi)
- Established: 1958
- Governing body: Maharashtra Forest Department
- World Heritage site: Since 2012

UNESCO World Heritage Site
- Official name: Natural Properties - Western Ghats (India)
- Type: Natural
- Criteria: ix, x
- Designated: 2012 (36th session)
- Reference no.: 1342
- Region: Indian subcontinent

Radhanagari Wildlife Sanctuary (Marathi: राधानगरी वन्यजीव अभयारण्य) is a wildlife sanctuary and natural World Heritage Site of category ix and x since 2012, located in Kolhapur district, Maharashtra State, India. It lies at the southern end of the Sahyadri hills in the Western Ghats. It is notable as the first declared wildlife sanctuary in Maharashtra, notified in 1958, as "Dajipur Wildlife Sanctuary" and is popularly known as the "Bison Sanctuary". Indian bison or gaur (Bos gaurus) with a population around 1091 in 2014, is the flagship species of the area. It was notified as Radhanagari wildlife sanctuary vide notification No. WLP/1085/CR/588/ V/F-5, Dt.16.9.1985. The area around the Sanctuary was declared as Eco sensitive zone by Govt. of India on 15 October 2020

== Geography ==
This is a natural World Heritage Site notified by UNESCO as Sahyadri sub cluster of Western Ghats. The sanctuary is located between 16°10" to 16°30" north latitude and 73°52" to 74°14" east longitude. The Krishna River tributaries, Bhogavati River, Dudhganga River, Tulshi River, Kallamma River and Dirba River flow through the sanctuary's area. State Highway 116 passes through the center of the sanctuary. It is located in Sahyadri hill ranges. The total area of the sanctuary is 351 km^{2} (136 sq mi).

== Flora ==
Radhanagari Wildlife Sanctuary contains tropical evergreen forests typical of the northern Western Ghats. 425 species of plants have been recorded in the sanctuary. The main species found over here are Anjani, Jambul, Hirda, Awala, Pisa, Ain, Kinjal, Amba, Kumbha, Bhoma, Chandala, Katak, Nana, Umbar, Jambha, Gela, Bibba and banana. Karvi is found over almost the entire area. Climbing plants such as shikekai and garambi are common. Shrub species and medicinal plants such as karvand, vagati (candy corn plant), ranmiri (orange climber), Tamalpatra Cinnamomum tamala, (toran), dhayati (fire-flame bush), kadipatta (curry tree), narkya, murudsheng (Indian screw-fruit) and a small amount of bamboo are also found. Large numbers of ephemeral bulbs of seasonal plants are also found here. Many sacred groves or devrais have been protected as a result of the efforts of the local communities.

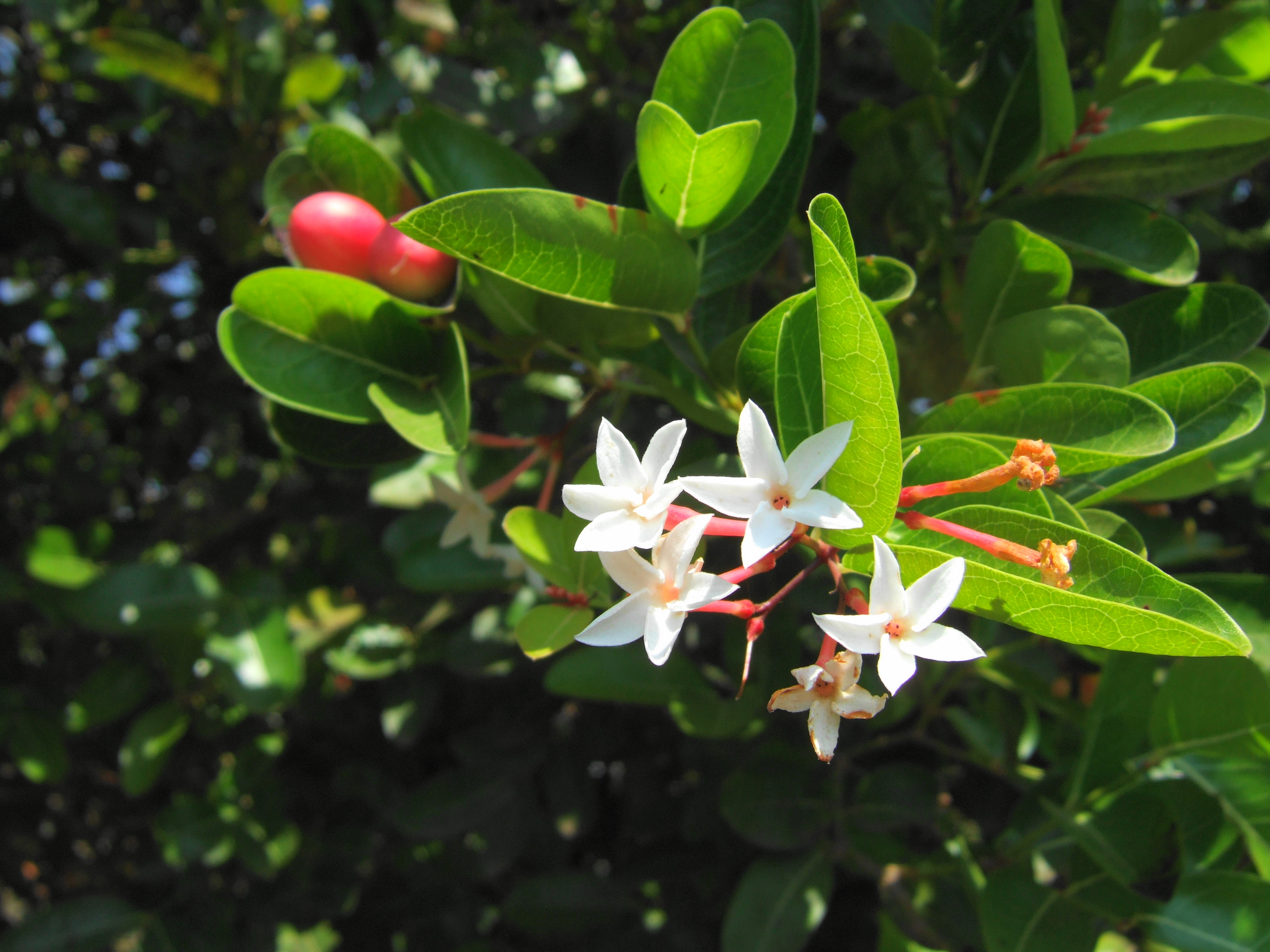
Flowers of Karvand bush

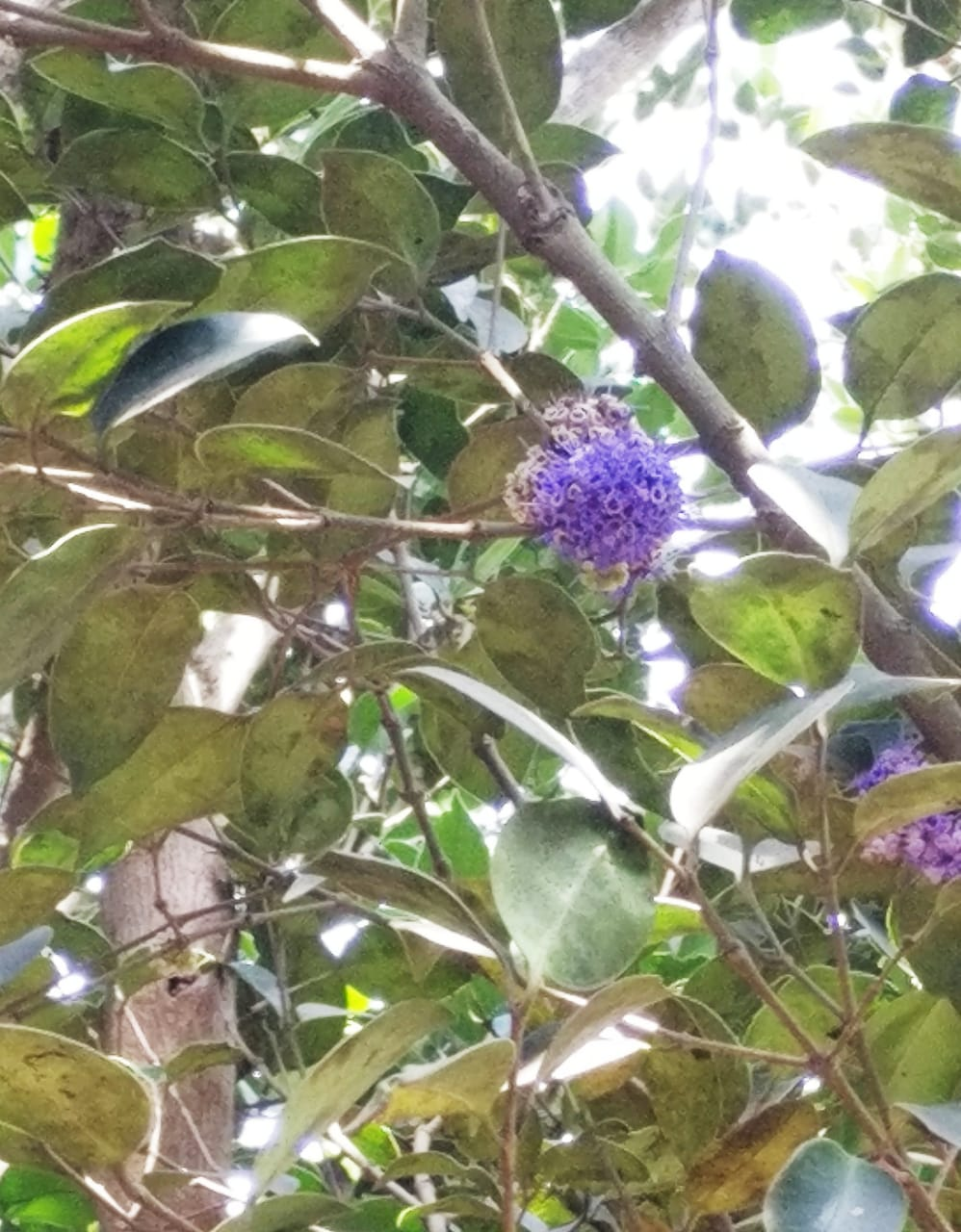
Anjani flowers

== Fauna ==
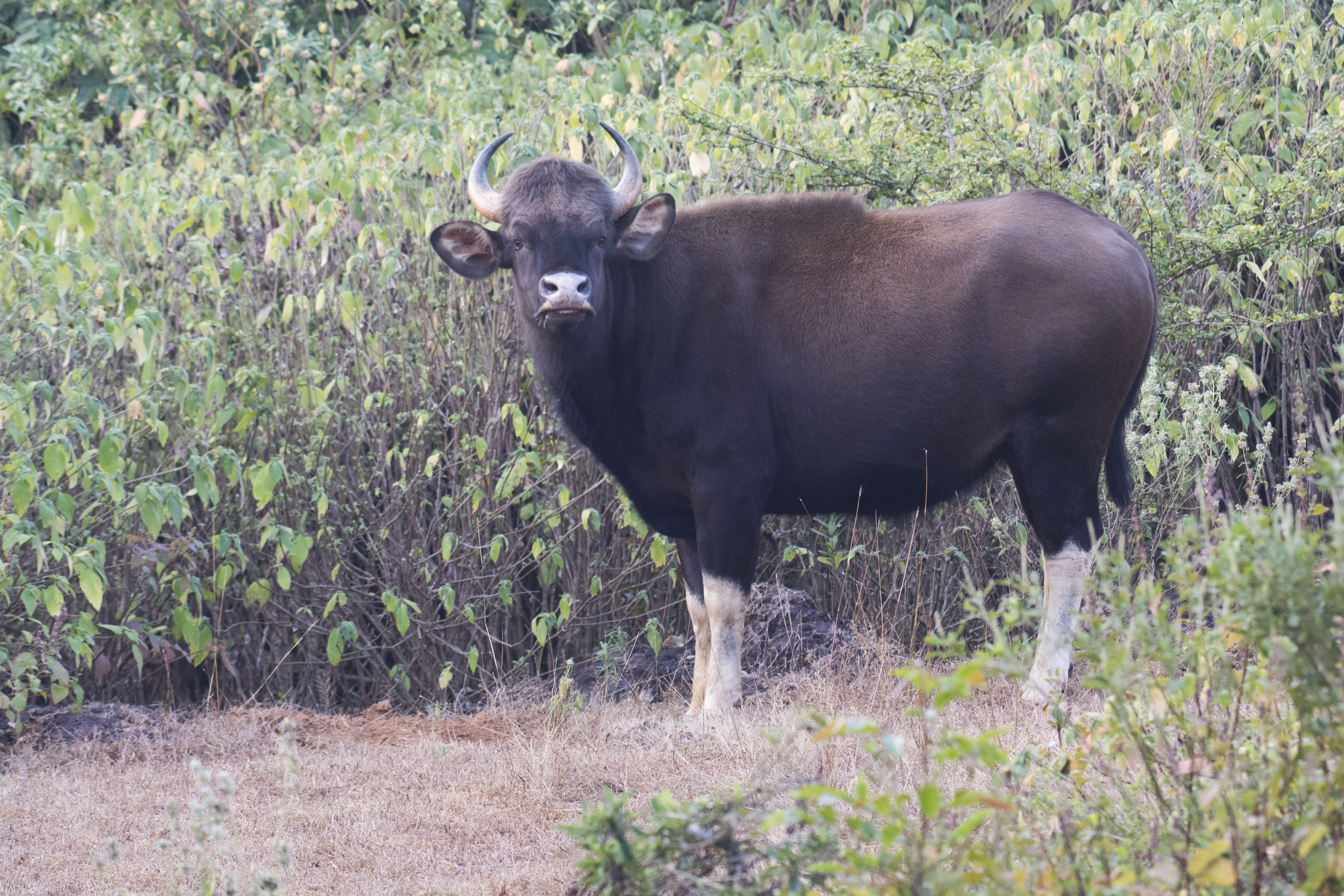
Indian bison

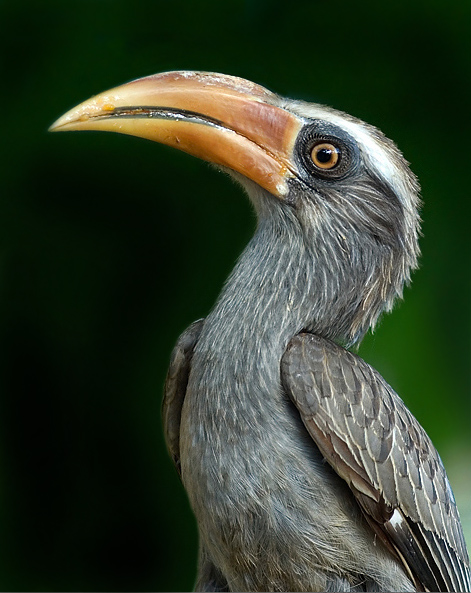
Adult male Malabar grey hornbill

Sanctuary contains 47 species of Mammals, 59 species of reptiles, 264 species of birds and 66 species of butterflies. Amphibians are most visible in the rainy season. 20 species from 2 orders, 5 families and 10 genera are listed in the sanctuary. Indian bison or gaur have a population around 610 in 2004, is the flagship species of the area. Other mammals, living in the sanctuary are Indian leopard (5), sloth bear, wild boar (80), barking deer (140), mouse deer (80), sambar (120), giant squirrel 50) and wild dogs (70). In recent years, 6 to 12 tigers were reported in Dajipur forest 2007-08. (anonymous reports- not yet confirmed)

Birds seen here include: vultures, eagles, jungle fowl, quails, plovers, sandpipers, owlets, doves, owls, nightjars, kingfishers, bee-eater, hornbills, woodpeckers, bulbul, flycatchers, warblers, wagtails, sunbirds are commonly seen. This sanctuary is designated as an Important Bird Area by BirdLife International and is home to the rare and globally threatened Nilgiri wood-pigeon (Columba elphinstonii). Other species found here include the Ceylon frogmouth, yellow-browed bulbul, dusky eagle-owl and great pied hornbill and one of India's most admired songbirds, the Malabar whistlingthrush. Two species endemic to the Western Ghats: the small sunbird and the Malabar grey hornbill have been sighted here. This sanctuary is a favorite nesting place for the speckled piculet, Malabar crested lark, and some species of Himalayan birds such as the Indian blue robin during the winter months.

Threatened species of reptiles and amphibians seen in this sanctuary include: Malabar pit viper, Deccan ground gecko, Gunther's cat skink, Beddome's lacerta, Bombay bush frog and Humayun's wrinkled frog.

== Threats ==
Open cast bauxite mining has been a serious threat to this protected area. In February 1998, the Bombay High Court passed a stay order halting bauxite mining operations in the Iderganj plateau. Other threats include, irrigation projects, encroachment of forest land, poaching, overgrazing, agriculture and construction of reservoirs.

== Visitor information ==
The nearest rail station is at Kolhapur, 45 km (28 mi). For accommodations, there is a forest rest house, dak bungalow, and a dormitory managed by the Deputy Conservator of Forests - Wildlife, Bindu chowk, Ganji Galli, Kolhapur. 416 002 India (91-231-2542766). There are two rest houses for the visitors. One at Dajipur and the other on the top of hill. The entry passes are issued from 7am to 2:30pm. However the entry inside the sanctuary is allowed from Sunrise to sunset. The private cars/jeeps are permitted inside the sanctuary. The roads are narrow and made by water bound macadam (WBM), so they are closed in rainy season. The vehicles are permitted up to the Shivrai sada, which is a large open ground with a water pond in the center. The wild animals visit the pond for water during sunrise and sunset. The Maharashtra Tourism Development Corporation (MTDC) is a state-owned enterprise that offers accommodation and tour packages in various tourist destinations across Maharashtra, including near the Radhanagari Wildlife Sanctuary. Visitors can book MTDC accommodation online through the official website or by visiting one of the MTDC booking offices in Maharashtra. MTDC offers a range of accommodation options near the Radhanagari Wildlife Sanctuary, including budget guesthouses, mid-range resorts, and luxurious cottages.

== Gallery ==
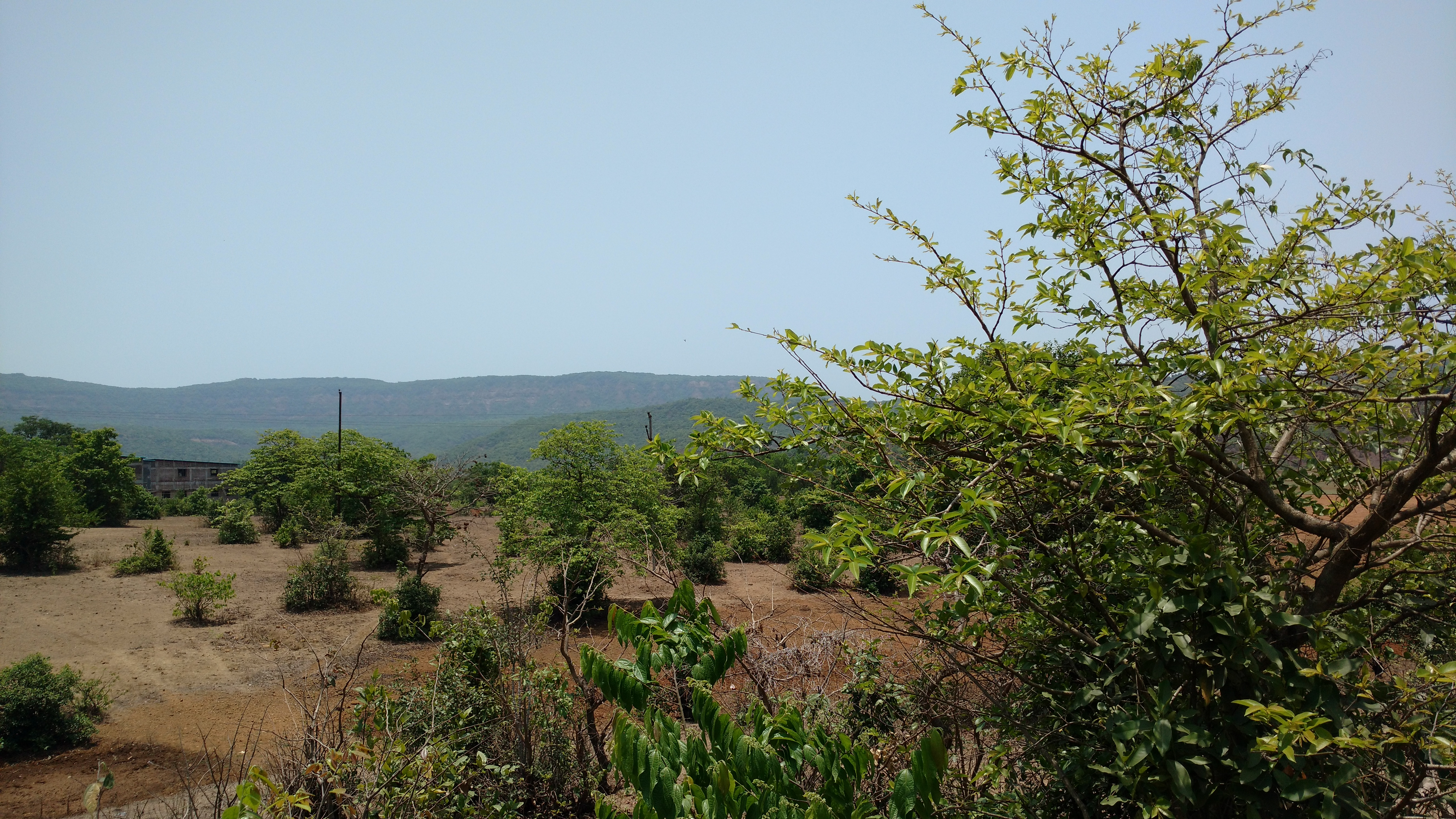
Radhanagri sanctuary from the main road

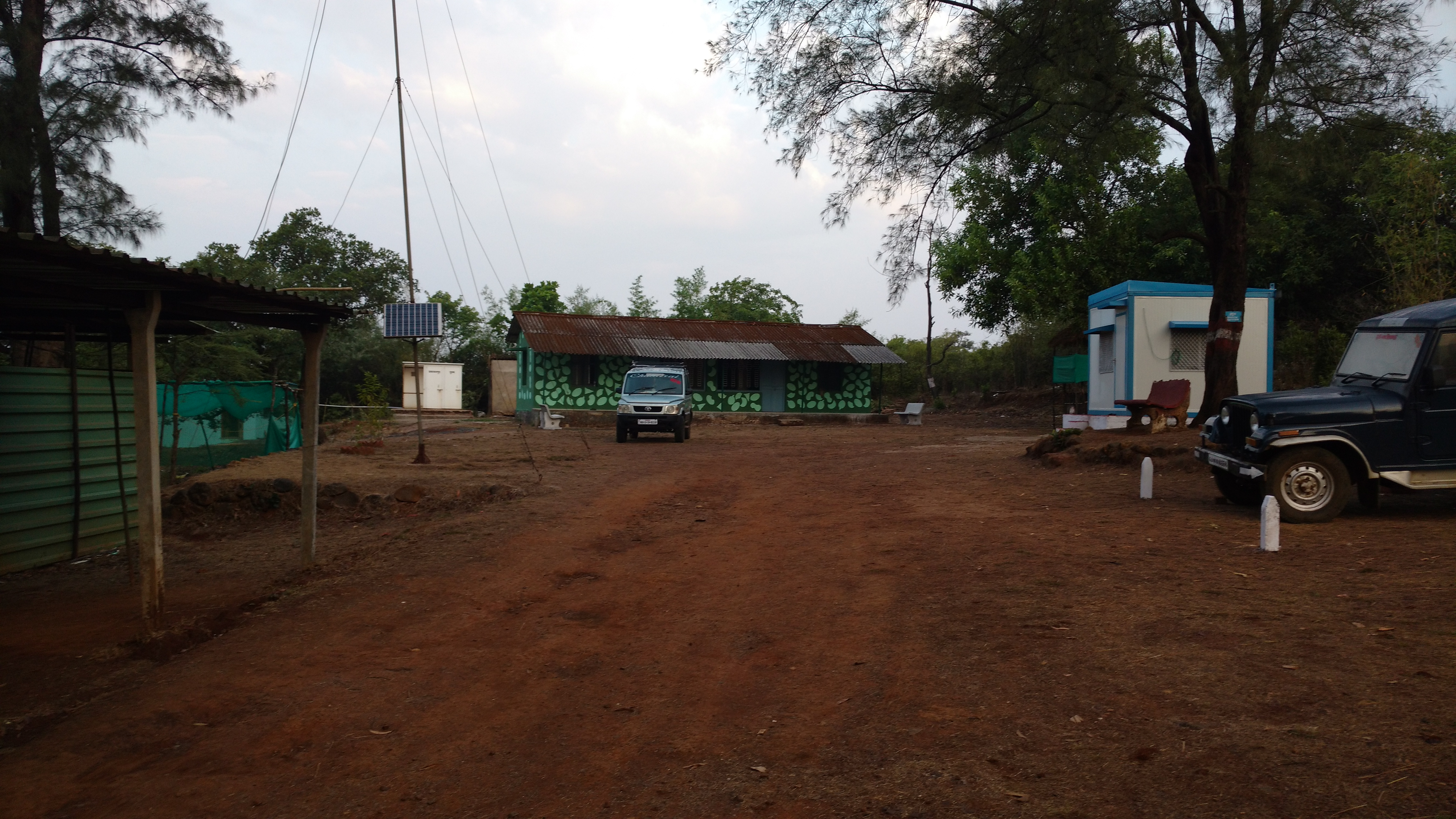
Dajipur gate complex

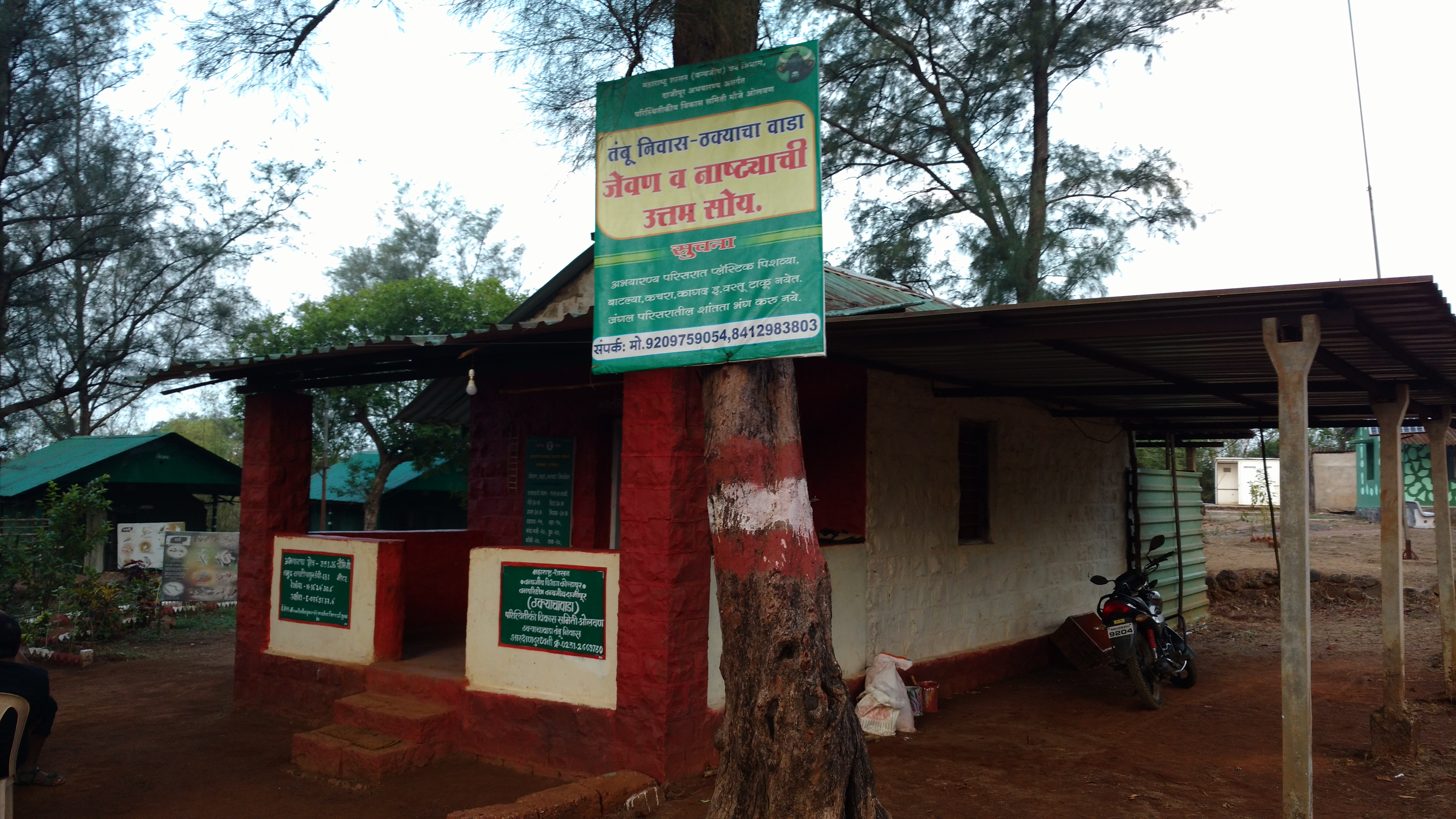
Office at Dajipur gate

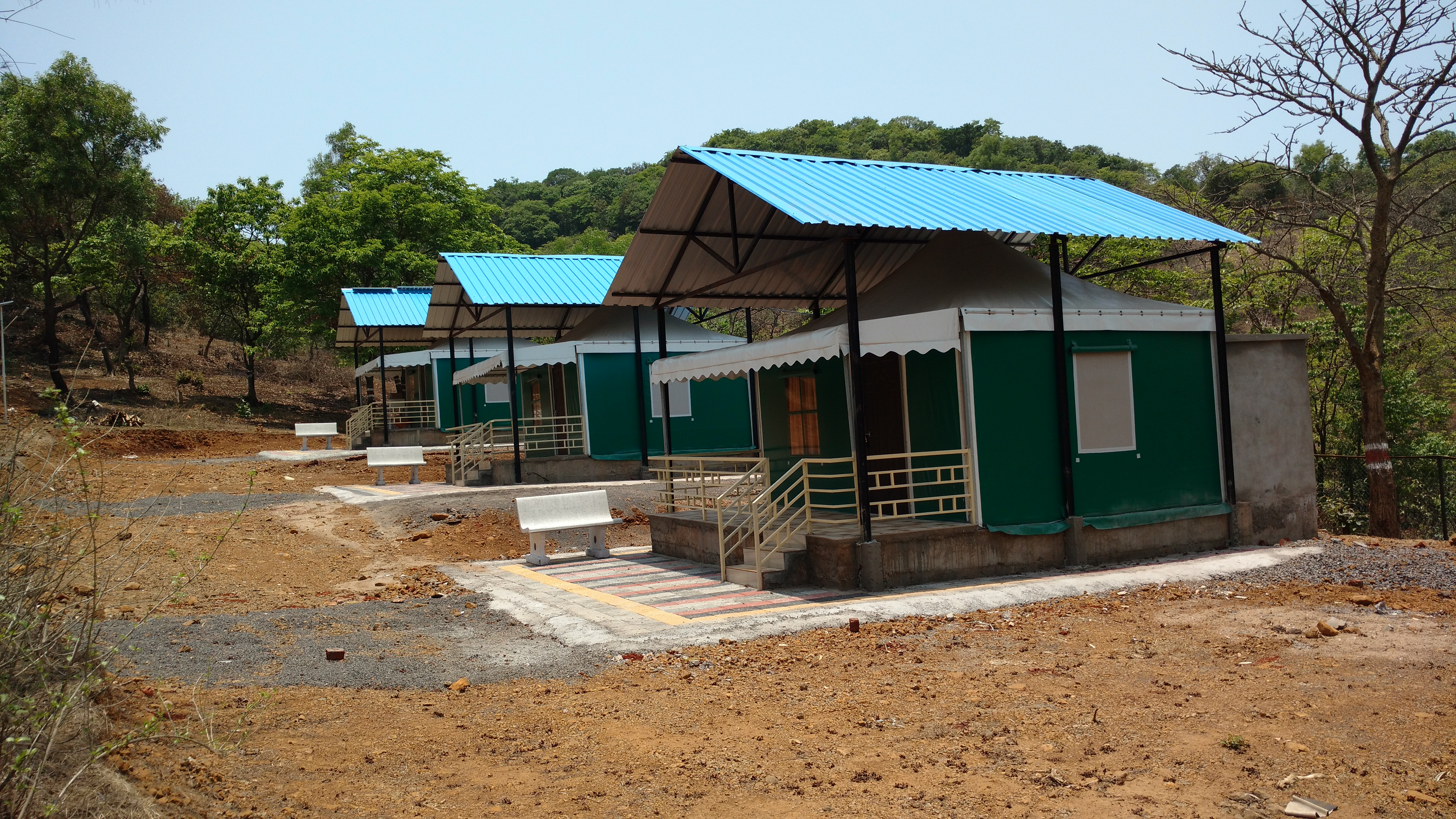
Tents at Dajipur village

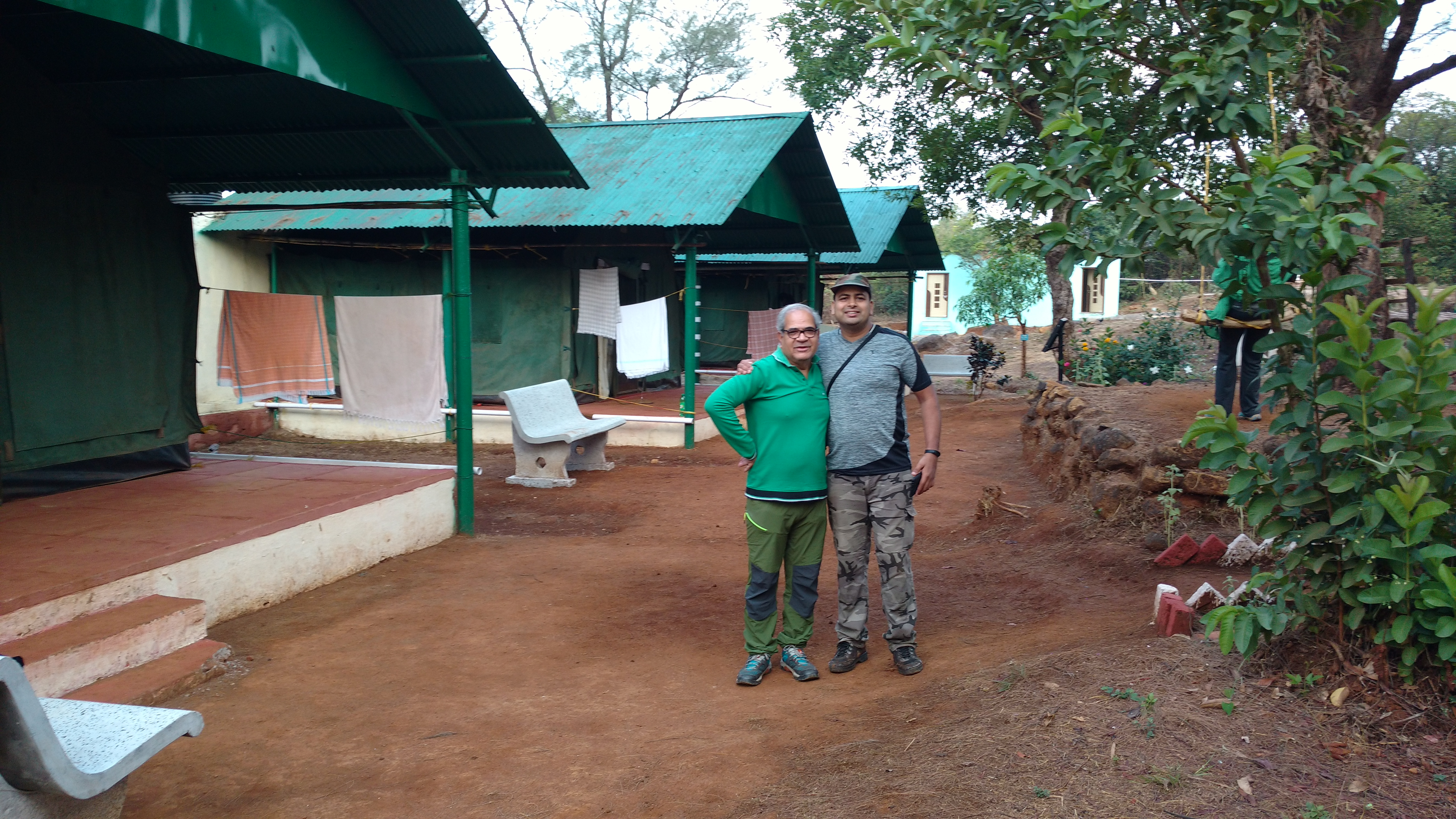
Tents at Dajipur forest gate

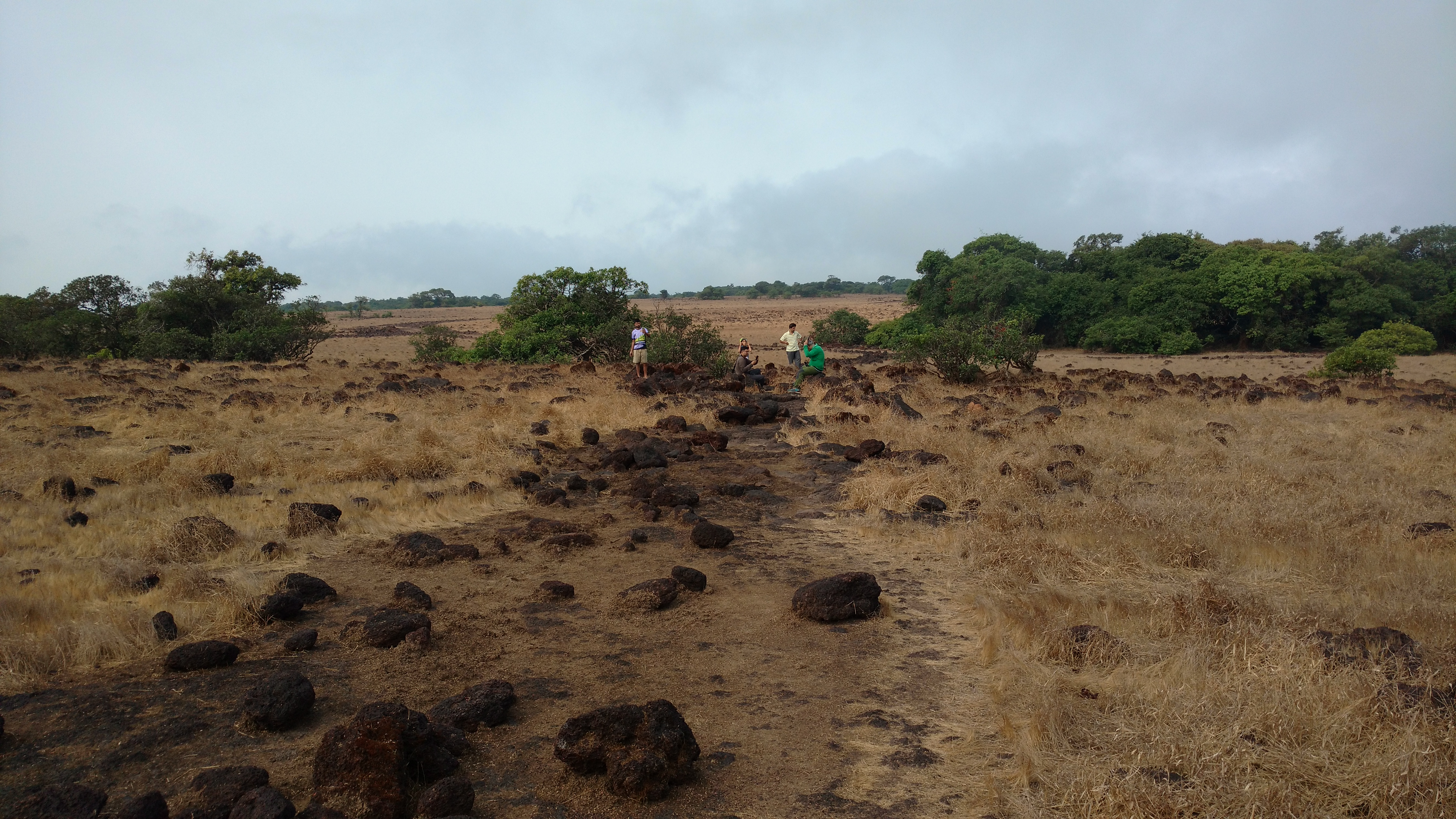
Shivrai sada

== See also ==
- Sahyadri Tiger Reserve
  - Chandoli National Park
  - Koyna Wildlife Sanctuary
