= Chandoli National Park =

National park in India

- Sahyadri Tiger Reserve
- IUCN category II (national park)
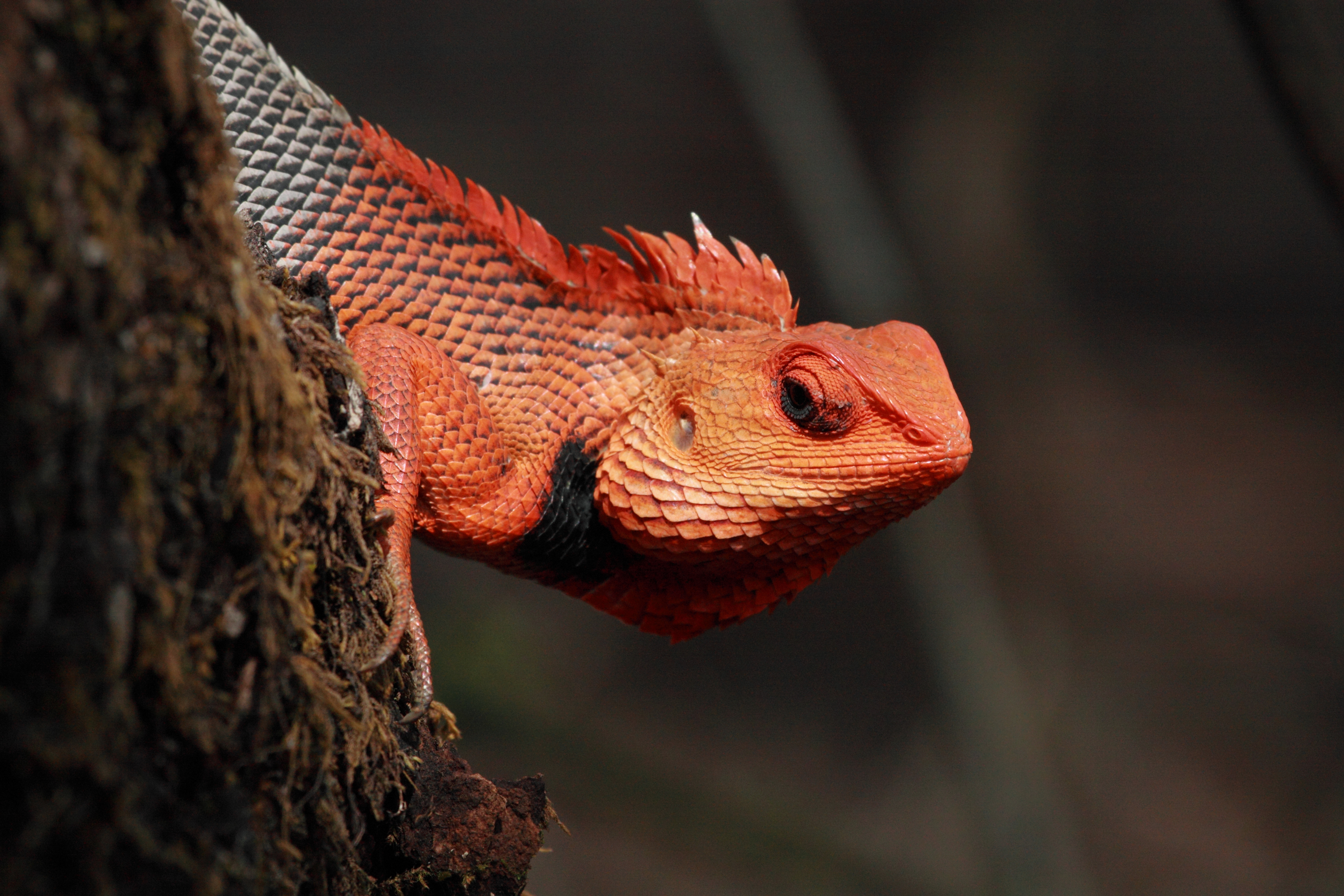
- Oriental garden lizard at Chandoli National Park

- Location within Maharashtra Location within India
- Interactive map of Chandoli National Park
- Location: Sangli District Maharashtra, India
- Nearest city: Sangli, kolhapur
- Coordinates: 17°11′30″N 73°46′30″E
- Area: 317.67 square kilometres (122.65 sq mi)
- Established: May 2004
- Governing body: Maharashtra State Forest Dept.
- Website: http://chandolinationalpark.com/ (unofficial)

UNESCO World Heritage Site
- Official name: Natural Properties - Western Ghats (India)
- Type: Natural
- Criteria: ix, x
- Designated: 2012 (36th session)
- Reference no.: 1342
- Region: Indian subcontinent

Chandoli National Park is a national park established in Sangli district in May 2004. Earlier it was a Wildlife Sanctuary declared in 1985. Chandoli Park is notable as the southern portion of the Sahyadri Tiger Reserve, with Koyna Wildlife Sanctuary forming the northern part of the reserve

== Sahyadri Tiger Reserve ==
The 741.22 km^{2} (286.19 sq mi) Sahyadri Tiger Reserve, including all of Chandoli National Park and Koyna Wildlife Sanctuary was declared by The National Tiger Conservation Authority as a Project Tiger tiger reserve on May 21, 2007. The Sahyadri Tiger Reserve was then estimated to have nine tigers and 66 leopards.

== Location ==
Chandoli National Park is located near the Chandoli Dam between longitudes 73°40' and 73°53' E and latitudes 17°03' and 17°20'N in Sangli District of Western Maharashtra. It lies between the Radhanagiri and Koyna Wildlife Sanctuaries and forms the southern part of the Sahyadri Tiger Reserve. it is near about 101 km from sangli

== History ==
The park includes historical places of note including 17th century forts of the Maratha Empire, Prachitgad and Bhairavgad. Most of the protected area was used an open jail for the "prisoners of war" of the early battles during Chhatrapati Shivaji Maharaj's rule. Chhatrapati Sambhaji Maharaj used Prachitgad as an observation point and recreational place.

== Geography ==
The park spreads along the crest of the Sahyadri Range of the northern Western Ghats. It forms and protects many perennial water channels, water holes and the Vasant Sagar Reservoir. Elevation of the park ranges from 589–1,044 m (1,932–3,425 ft). The park receives its water supply from the Warna river and reservoir as well as several other small streams and rivers. Flat topped mountains, rocky, lateritic plateaus called 'Saddas', almost devoid of vegetation, large boulders and caves are distinctive to the protected areas in the Sahyadri region of the Western Ghats.

== Flora ==
The forest types seen here are a mix of Malabar Coast moist forests and North Western Ghats moist deciduous forests. In the dwarf evergreen forests, some tree species commonly seen here are the anjani ironwood tree, jamun, pisa (angustifolia), fig, Olea (diocia), katak spinous kino tree, nana or Crape myrtle (lanceolata), kinjal, kokum tree and phanasi false kelat (brachiata). Other trees dominating the landscape include asan wood or ain or Indian laurel, amla or Indian gooseberry, umbar or devil fig (hispida) and harra or chebulic myrobalan.

Grasses commonly seen here include bangala or bluestem grass sp., dongari or golden beard grass (fulvus), black spear grass, kalikusli or tangle grass, anjan grass or buffel grass, grader grass or karad or kangaroo grass (quadrivalvis) and grasses belonging to family Poaceae, like saphet-kusli or Aristida funiculata]. Insectivorous plant species like sundews and bladderworts sp. are also found in this protected area.

== Fauna ==
Nearly 23 species of mammals, 122 species of birds, 20 species of amphibians and reptiles are known to be resident in the forests of Chandoli. The tiger, leopard, Indian bison, leopard cat, sloth bear and giant squirrel are quite conspicuous here.

Many prey species of ungulates such as the barking deer, sambar deer, mouse deer and blackbuck are present. A census carried out in 2002 by the Forest Department showed a rise in the number of tigers, leopards, gaur, barking deer, mouse deer, sloth bears and blackbuck. A similar census carried out in 2004 showed a rise in gaur population in the Kolhapur Wildlife Division from 88 to 243.

On 23 and 24 May 2018, a tiger was photographed in a camera trap in Chandoli. This was the first direct evidence of tigers in the reserve in eight years. Prior to that, in 2014, scat DNA and model-based predictions were used to estimate that the reserve had five to eight tigers.

== Development ==
Work undertaken for habitat improvement and development in the Chandoli National Park include removal of invasive species, soil conservation and water conservation, vaccination of cattle, research, fire prevention, providing salt licks, demarcation of boundary, erection of watch towers, maintenance of nature trails, desalting water holes, development of grasslands, and procurement of Wireless two-way radios.

== Threats ==
The Maharashtra government has plans to set up the Karadi-Bhogiv hydro-electric project in the catchment area of the Warna Dam that is expected to use up 6.78 km^{2} (2.62 sq mi) of forest land. On a positive note, nearly 7,894 people and a significant cattle population resident on 84.29 km^{2} (32.54 sq mi) of land in 32 villages within the park. These villages have been successfully relocated to areas outside the park. This measure has helped to preserve and regenerate some of the vegetation in this protected area.

== Nearest City ==
Sangli

== Nearest Railway Station ==
Sangli railway station

== See also ==
- Konkan
- Wildlife of India
- Sahyadri
