= Gramgeeta =

1979 Marathi poetry book by Tukdoji Maharaj

Gramgeeta: An Epic On Indian Village Life is a book of Marathi Poetry, authored by Rashtrasant Tukdoji Maharaj. This book is an ideal reference for developing village community.

The book has the following significant conclusions in it:

1. God cannot be found in Temples, Churches and Mosques as he is everywhere.

2. The best devotion to God leads to human upliftment.

3. Focus on teaching younger generation traditions that are relevant for current times.

4. O'God, Your power perfection has not penetrated in us and thus ignorance prevails amongst us.

5. The touch of divine knowledge makes one understand what is wrong and right.

6. People have become weak, ignorant, dome due to belief in blind faith in God and religion.

7. Community's talents should be used for development of the village.

Tukdoji Maharaj also wrote the poem Bodhamrut which is used in the educational syllabus of the Maharashtra State Board of Secondary and Higher Secondary Education Textbooks, specifically the Marathi Textbooks published by the Balbharti.

== First edition ==
- Wardha, Maharashtra : Rashtrasant Sahitya Prachaar Mandala, 1979
- Gramgeeta, originally written by Rashtrasant Tukdoji Maharaj in Marathi language, is also available in English, Gujarati, and Hindi.
