= Shivsagar Lake =

Lake in Maharashtra, India

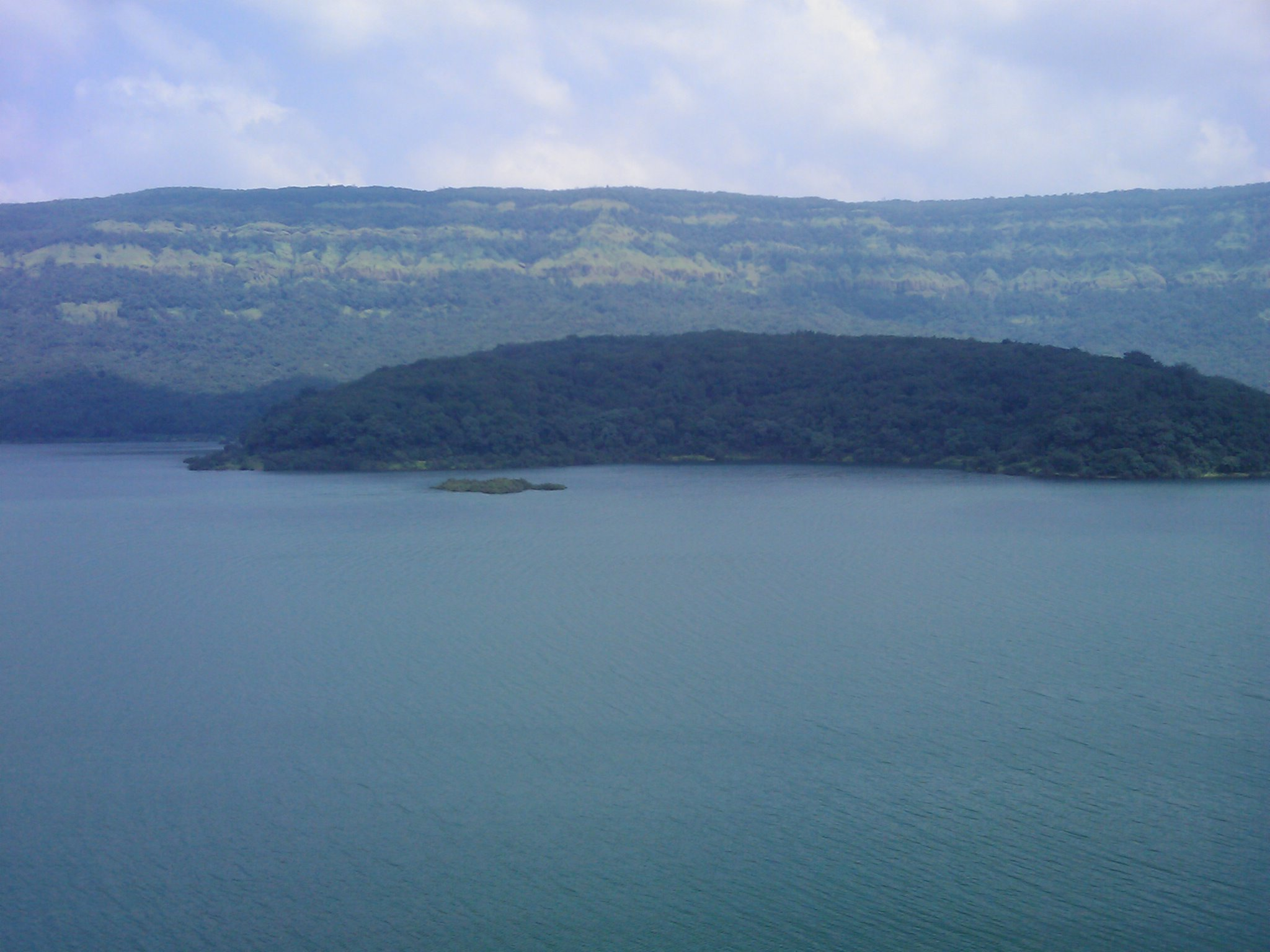

- Location within Maharashtra
- Location: Satara, Maharashtra
- Coordinates: 17°24′30″N 73°45′35″E
- Type: Reservoir
- Primary inflows: Koyna River
- Primary outflows: Koyna River
- Basin countries: India
- Max. length: 50 km (31 mi)
- Surface area: 891.78 km^{2} (344 mi^{2})
- Max. depth: 80 m (260 ft)
- Water volume: 2,797,400,000 m^{3} (9.879×10^{10} ft^{3})

The Shivsagar Lake is a reservoir in the state of Maharashtra, India. The lake was formed after the Koyna Dam, completed in 1964, impounded the Koyna River. It has a length of 50 km (31 mi) and depth of 80 m (262 ft).

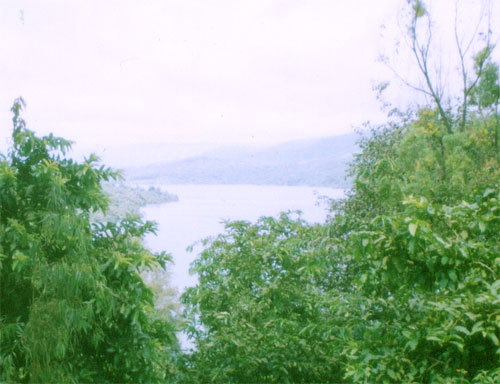
The Shivasagar Lake

== See also ==
- Koyna Hydroelectric Project
- Koyna Dam
- Koyna Wildlife Sanctuary
