= Gagangiri Maharaj =

Indian Hindu saint and Guru

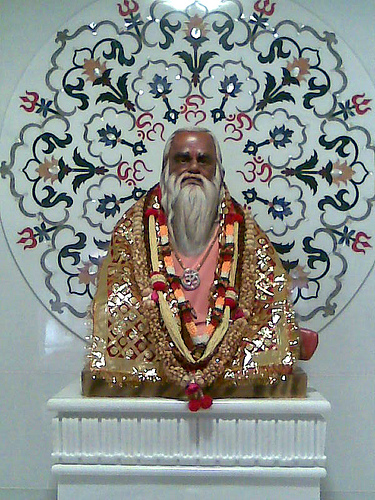
- Gaganagiri Maharaj Samadhi at Khopoli Ashram

Personal life
- Born: Shripad Ganpatrao Patankar; 30 November 1906 Mandure, Patan, Maharashtra
- Died: 4 February 2008 (aged 101) Khopoli, Raigad, Maharashtra
- Honors: Vishva Gaurav, Parliament of the World's Religions

Religious life
- Religion: Hinduism

Swami Gagangiri Maharaj was an Indian Hindu religious figure associated with the Natha Sampradaya. He is described in devotional and biographical accounts as a practitioner of austerities, including prolonged water penance, and meditation. Some followers venerate him as an incarnation of Dattatreya. He has been cited as a respected figure among sections of India’s ascetic and yogis communities.

== Life ==
Shri Gagangiri Maharaj was born as Shripad Patankar in a village named Mandure in Patan, Satara district of Maharashtra. Patankar family is an imperial family and are direct descendants of the Chalukya dynasty which once ruled much of South and Central India. At the age of seven, he left home and went to a Matha of Nath sampradaya which was located at Battees-Shirala. At a very early age he took Sannyasa.

After getting initiated in a monastic order he started travelling with various Mahants, sages of Nath Sampradaya. Gagangiri maharaj was a child prodigy and mastered several shastras, yoga and various Tantras at a very young age. He travelled to far and wide places such as Nepal, Bhutan, Manas Sarovar, Gaurishankar, Gorakshdarbar, Gorakhpur, Pashupatinath and returned to Almora. Finally, he travelled through the Valley of Ganga, Himachal Pradesh and reached Badrika Ashram.

Gagangiri Maharaj was extremely tired as a result of his peregrinations and he decided to rest in a cave. When he was relaxing, a sage wearing saffron robes came there from the mountains. He sprinkled water from his kamandalu, on the face of Gagangiri Maharaj. He also gave him some kind of green grass to eat which resembled coriander leaves. For his penance, he had prepared mattresses of grass. He found his mattresses growing like living vegetation. This was considered as an experience, where Tantrik technique is perfected. He did a number of Kaya Kalpas. In this process he invented several new concepts in Tantrik techniques and proved them true. He did penance at a number of places like Mauli Kund, Mauli Kada, Zanzu water, Mausame Kada, Kasarbari, Ginger water, Sat-barkund, Holi Kada, Margaj water, Jungledeo patti, Shirale etc.

He did penance in a pond near the river at Sangashi, Vazar, Vesraf, Palsambe, Ramling etc. Later he went to Vijaydurg, in the Konkan area from where he reached Bombay by steamer. During 1945 to 1948, he did Kayakalpa at Angale, near Rajapur in Konkan. As more and more people benefited by his meditation, more and more people started worshipping and respecting him, and his reputation spread all around. Maharaj ji was followed by various high-ranking officials and ministers like Yashwantrao Chavan, Balasaheb Desai, Rajarambapu Patil, Patangrao Kadam

Swamiji then decided to travel all over India alone on foot yet again and accordingly his journey started. At this time, his fair skin was glowing with youth. Attired in saffron robes of a sanyasi, young and wise, Swamiji was revered by people. He travelled on foot from Haridwar to Delhi, Bhopal, etc. At Bhopal while he was taking rest after bath near a tank, the princely ruler of Kolhapur and his retinue happened to be nearby while on a brief visit. Swamiji's mother tongue being Marathi, a conversation between him and Kolhapur ruler's retinue ensued resulting in the ruler requesting Swamiji to accompany him to Kolhapur. In 1932 the Raja of Kolhapur had been to Dajipur jungle for hunting. Swamiji who had accompanied him stayed back in the jungle, where he lived from 1932 to 1940. He spent these years in meditation and deep reflection. In Bombay between 1948 and 1950, he stayed in Dadi Hirji Parsi graveyards, near the temple of Maruti, at shidi near Walkeshwar. Guru pournima (full moon day of Ashadha month for worshipping the Guru) used to be celebrated on a big scale at Birla Kreeda Kendra in Mumbai. In spite of all these preoccupations in respect of the society, he continued his penance for over 60 years. Maharaj also called upon thwasuth to come forward and revive the glory of Hinduism. He was awarded "Vishwagaurav Vibhushan" by the Parliament of the World's Religions.

== Teachings ==
Gagangiri Maharaj was an active environmentalist seer. He preached and spread awareness about the conservation and protection of the environment. His teachings emphasized on living in a harmonious relationship with nature and preserving it. He was active in several tree plantation drives and encouraged conservation of biodiversity.

== Ashrams and devotees ==
Gagangiri Maharaj used to travel between his ashrams in Khopoli and Gaganbawda. In Malad Ashram, devotees light lamps on the occasion of Kojagiri Purnima each year. He has a huge number of devotees in the states of Maharashtra, Madhya Pradesh, Gujarat, Goa, Karnataka, Telangana, and Andhra Pradesh. His ashrams are located in Maharashtra, Goa, and Andhra Pradesh. He had devotees like Dhirubhai Ambani, Bal Thackeray, Mamata Kulkarni. Interestingly, the rosary of rudraksha which Balasaheb generally held in his hands was a blessing given to him by Gagangiri Maharaj.

Maharaj took Mahasamadhi on 4 February 2008 at 3:30 a.m.during Brahmamuhurtha at his Ashram in Khopoli.
