= Tukdoji Maharaj =

Indian spiritual saint (1909–1968)

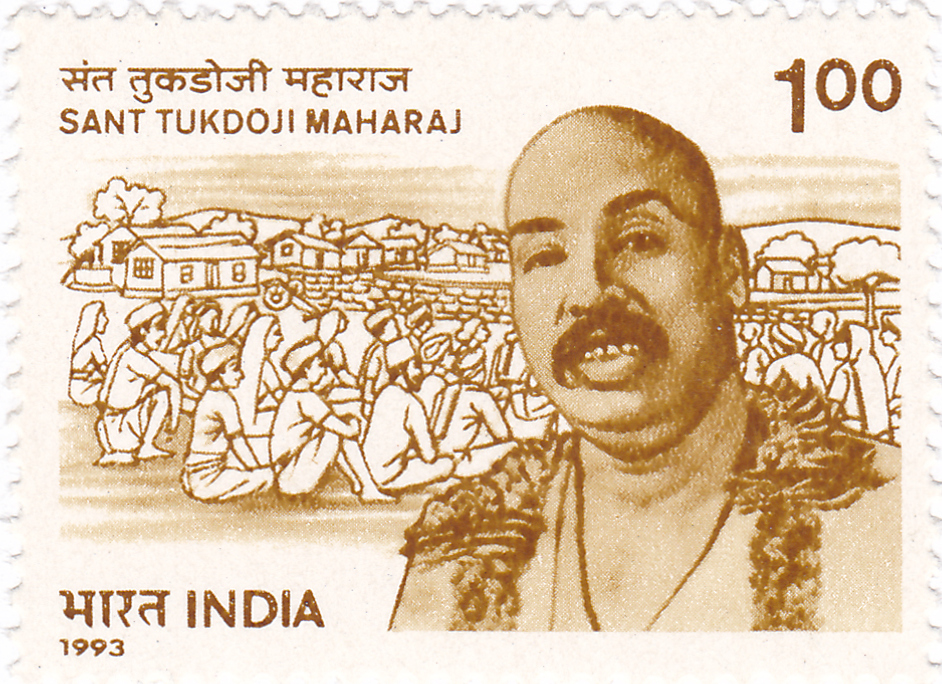
- Tukdoji Maharaj on a 1995 stamp of India
- Born: Manikdev Banduji Ingale (Bhaat); 30 April 1909; Yawali, Central Provinces and Berar, British India
- Died: 11 October 1968 (aged 59); Gurukunj Ashram, Amravati District, Maharashtra, India
- Other name: Rashtrasant
- Notable work: Gramgeeta, Geeta Prasad
- Title: Rashtrasant

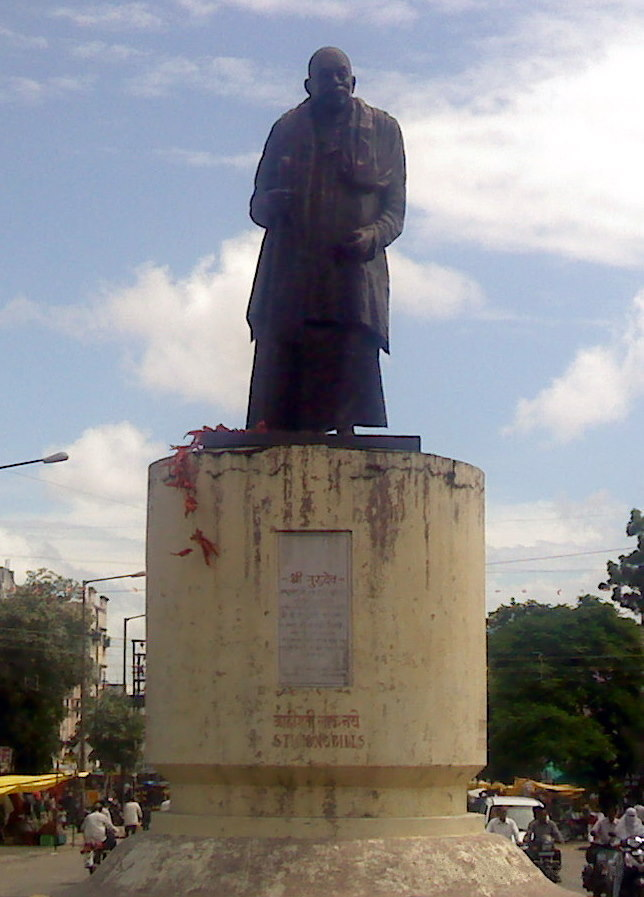
Statue of Tukdoji Maharaj at Nagpur

Tukdoji Maharaj (30 April 1909 – 11 October 1968) was a spiritual saint from India. He was a disciple of Aadkoji Maharaj. Tukdoji Maharaj was involved in social reforms in the rural regions of Maharashtra, including construction of roads. Tukdoji Maharaj wrote Gramgeeta which means village development. Many of the development programs started by him worked efficiently even after his death.

== Biography ==
Saint Tukdoji Maharaj was born in Yawali, Amravati district, Maharashtra. He received spiritual initiation from Samarth Adkoji Maharaj of Warkhed gram. Early in childhood, Saint Tukdoji Maharaj performed rigorous penance and spiritual exercises in self-realisation. He was an orator and a musician who composed more than 3000 bhajans (spiritual poems) in Hindi and Marathi, having performed for the spiritual teacher Meher Baba in 1937 and 1944. He also wrote many articles on Dharma, society, nation and education. He studied the existing religious sects and other schools of thought and discussed religious and secular problems of the devotees.

== Work ==
In 1941, Tukdoji Maharaj performed individual acts of civil resistance, called satyagraha, and took part in the mass upsurge of the 'Quit India' movement. He was arrested in 1942 and was imprisoned in Nagpur and Raipur Central Jails. When India had become independent, he concentrated on rural reconstruction, establishing the 'All India Shri Gurudev Seva Mandal' and developing programmes for integrated rural development. Rajendra Prasad, who was the first President of India, bestowed the title of 'Rashtrasant' on him.

He took part in Acharya Vinoba Bhave's land reform movement, known as the Bhoodan Movement, and he worked with relief aid at the time of the Bengal famine in 1945, at the time of the Sino-Indian War in 1962, and the Koyna earthquake in 1967.

He attended the World Conference of Religion and World Peace in Japan in 1955.

He died on 11 October 1968.

== Honors ==
In 2005, the Nagpur University was renamed to Rashtrasant Tukadoji Maharaj Nagpur University. The postal department of India issued a commemorative stamp in his name in 1993.

== Books written ==
- Gramgeeta (in Marathi; later translated by others in English, Hindi, Urdu, Gujrati, and Sanskrit.)
- Sartha Anandamrut
- Sartha Atmaprabhav
- Geeta Prasad
- Gramgeeta
- Laharki Barkha Part 1, 2 & 3
- Anubhav Prakash Part 1, 2 and 3
- Meri Japan Yatra.

== Popular culture ==
- A short documentary depicting Maharaj was written and produced by Manoj Bhishnurkar.
- Jeevanyogi, his biography, was written and published by his follower Sudam Sawarkar in the year 1990.

== See also ==
- Rashtrasant Tukadoji Maharaj Nagpur University
