= Tai Telin =

Ramabai Telin, also known as Tai Telin, was the wife of Pant Pratinidhi, the Raja Magadhoji Teli of Aundh. In 1806, Pant Pratinidhi was imprisoned by Peshwa Baji Rao II at Masur. During his absence, Tai Telin obtained the possession of Vasota and had the dash and courage to release her paramour. Pratinidhi declared himself the servant of the Raja of Satara, and broke off relations with the Peshva. He was, however, soon overpowered at Vasantgad by Bapu Gokhale, the former General of Peshwa. Tai Telin, however, continued to fight the Gokhale for over eight months at Vasota; but had to surrender in consequence of a fire which destroyed her granary.

A Marathi limerick about this incident:

श्रीमंत पंतप्रतिनिधींचा 
किल्ला अजिंक्य वासोटा;
ताई तेलीण मारील सोटा 
बापू गोखल्या सांभाळ कासोटा.
