= Koyna Dam =

Koyna Dam कोयना धरण
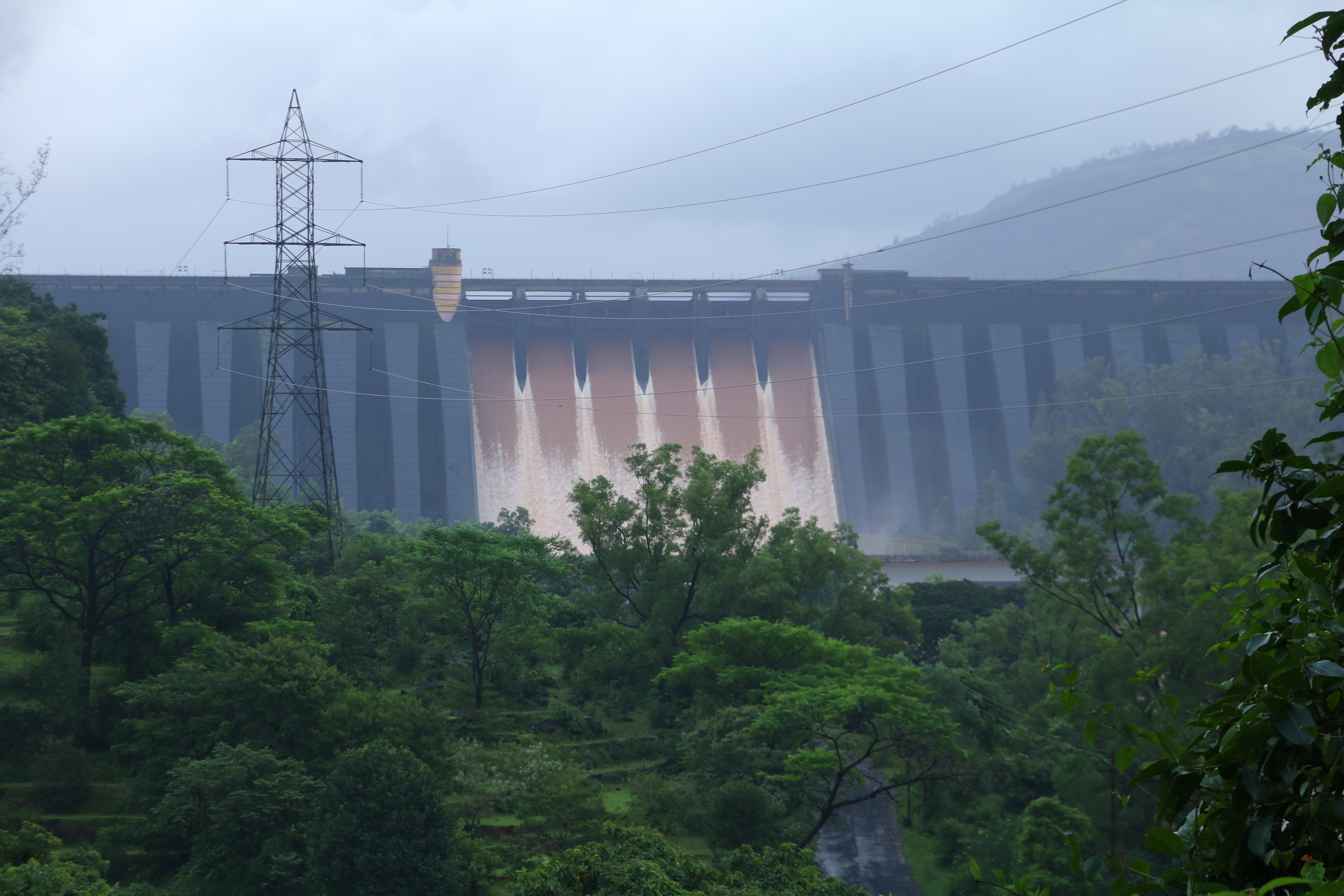
- Water being released from Koyna Dam during the 2021 Maharashtra floods.

- Location of Koyna Dam in Maharashtra
- Official name: Koyna Dam D05104
- Location: Koyna Nagar, Maharashtra; India
- Coordinates: 17°24′06″N 73°45′08″E
- Construction began: 1956
- Opening date: 1964
- Owner: Government of Maharashtra

Dam and spillways
- Type of dam: Rubble-concrete dam
- Impounds: Koyna River
- Height: 103.2 m (339 ft)
- Length: 807.2 m (2,648 ft) (0.8 km)
- Spillways: 6 Gates

Reservoir
- Creates: Shivasagar Lake
- Total capacity: 2,981,000,000 m^{3} (2,417,000 acre⋅ft) OR 105.27 tmc ft
- Surface area: 891.78 km^{2} (344 mi^{2})

Power Station
- Turbines: Koyna dam foot powerhouse: 2 x 20 MW stage 1: 4 x 70 MW stage 2: 4 x 75 MW stage 3: 4 x 80 MW stage 4: 4 x 250 MW; Total = 18 Francis turbines
- Installed capacity: 1,960 MW

The Koyna Dam is one of the largest dams in Maharashtra, India. It is a rubble-concrete dam constructed on Koyna River which rises in Mahabaleshwar, a hillstation in Sahyadri ranges. It is located in Koyna Nagar, Satara district, in the Western Ghats on the state highway between Chiplun (44 KM) and Karad (58 KM).

== Details ==
The main purpose of the dam is hydroelectricity generation with some irrigation in neighboring areas. Today the Koyna Hydroelectric Project is the second largest completed hydroelectric power plant in India having a total installed capacity of 1,960 MW. Due to its electricity generating potential, Koyna river is considered as the 'life line of Maharashtra'.

The spillway of the dam is located at the center. It has 6 radial gates. The dam plays a vital role of flood controlling in monsoon season. The catchment area dams the Koyna river and forms the Shivasagar Lake which is approximately 50 km (31 mi) in length. It is one of the largest civil engineering projects commissioned after Indian independence. The Koyna hydro-electric project is run by the Maharashtra State Electricity Board.

The dam has withstood many earthquakes in the recent past, including the devastating 1967 Koynanagar earthquake, resulting in the dam developing some cracks. After the disaster grouting of the cracks was done. Also internal holes were drilled to relieve the hydrostatic pressures in the body of the dam. Indian scientific establishment has formulated an ambitious project to drill a deep borehole in the region and intensely study the earthquake activity. This would help in better understanding and possible forecast of earthquakes. The proposal is to drill up to 7 km and study the physical, geological and chemical processes and properties of the reservoir triggered earthquake zone in real time. It would be an international project to be led by Indian scientists.

In 1973 the non-overflow portion of the dam was strengthened, followed by strengthening the spillway section in 2006. Now the dam is expected to be safe against any future earthquake, including ones with a higher intensity than that of 1967.

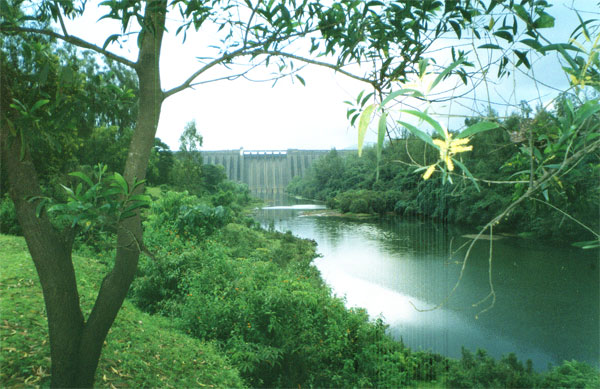
The Koyna Dam in Maharashtra

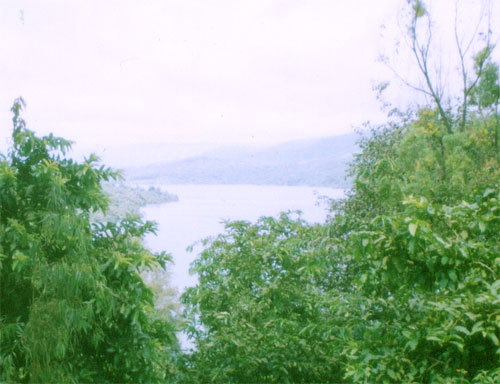
The Shivajisagar Lake

== See also ==
- Koyna Hydroelectric Project
- Sahyadri Tiger Reserve
  - Koyna Wildlife Sanctuary
- List of power stations in India
- List of conventional hydroelectric power stations
