= Koyna Wildlife Sanctuary =

Wildlife sanctuary in India

- Sahyadri Tiger Reserve
- IUCN category IV (habitat/species management area)
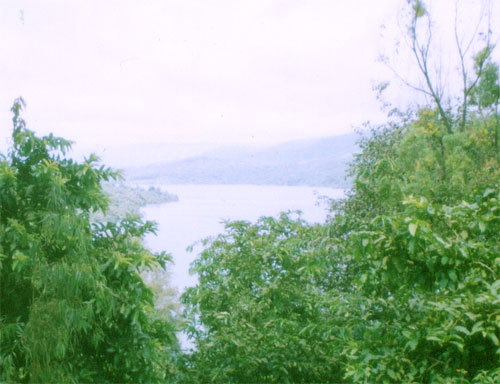
- Catchment area of the Shivsagar Reservoir

- Location within Maharashtra Location within India
- Interactive map of Koyna Wildlife Sanctuary
- Location: Satara, Maharashtra India
- Nearest city: Kolhapur, Pune, Karad and Satara
- Coordinates: 17°32′56″N 73°45′11″E
- Area: 423.55 square kilometres (163.53 sq mi)
- Established: 1985
- Governing body: Maharashtra State Forest Department

UNESCO World Heritage Site
- Official name: Natural Properties - Western Ghats (India)
- Type: Natural
- Criteria: ix, x
- Designated: 2012 (36th session)
- Reference no.: 1342
- Region: Indian subcontinent

Koyna Wildlife Sanctuary is a wildlife sanctuary and natural World Heritage Site, which is located in Satara district of the Indian state of Maharashtra. Further, this wildlife sanctuary is designated as an Important Bird area. The sanctuary is nested in the Western Ghats, covering an area of around 423.55 km^{2} (163.53 sq mi), and elevations ranging from 600 to 1,100 m (2,000 to 3,600 ft). It was notified in 1985 as a wildlife sanctuary situated in Maharashtra. It forms the northern portion of the Sahyadri Tiger Reserve, with Chandoli National Park forming the southern part of the reserve.

== History ==
The Vasota Fort lies deep in the forests and is located at an elevation of 1,120 m (3,670 ft) above sea level. The legend states that the fort was constructed by Malwa king Raja Bhoja in 1170.

== Geography ==
The rivers Koyna, Kandati, and Solashi meander through the sanctuary. It also forms the catchment area for the Koyna River, and Shivsagar reservoir formed by the Koyna Dam. To the south of the park lies the Chandoli National Park. The sanctuary includes eastern and western catchments of the Koyna dam. The sanctuary is well protected by the large extent of Shivsagar reservoir and steep slopes of the Western Ghats on both the sides. This protected area is connected by a forested wildlife corridor to Chandoli National Park and Radhanagari Wildlife Sanctuary in the south. Like Chandoli, Koyna is part of Sahyadri Tiger Reserve.

The average altitude is 897 m (2,943 ft). The mean annual rainfall is 5,500 mm (220 in).

== Flora ==
The sanctuary has dense forests with three major sections, Vasota, Maharkhor and Indavli Met, and is endowed with natural protective boundaries, with Shivsagar Lake on one side, and the slopes of the Western Ghats on both sides. These geographic barriers have enabled the emergence of a wide variety of flora and fauna and high biodiversity in the sanctuary. Due to the wide range of elevations in the sanctuary, the ecoregions in the sanctuary include North Western Ghats montane rain forests above 1,000 m (3,300 ft) and North Western Ghats moist deciduous forests below. Dominant species are anjani, jambul, hirda, awala, pisa, ain, kinjal, amba, kumbha, bhoma, chandala, katak, nana, umbra, jambha, gela and bibba. Karvi is found almost all over the area. Climbers such as shikekai, garambi are common. Some of the threatened species of trees found in the sanctuary are dhup (Indian frankincense), longan, and Elaeocarpus spp. Shrubs and medicinal plants such as karvand, agati, ranmiri, tamalpati, toran, dhayati, kadipatta, narkya and murudsheng, along with a small quantity of bamboo are also found. A large number of ephemeral bulbs of seasonal plants are found.

== Fauna ==
The sanctuary has a diverse variety of mammals including the keystone species, Bengal tigers (>6). Also, Indian leopards (14), Indian gaur (220-250), sloth bears (70-80), sambar deer (160-175), barking deer (180-200) and mouse deer, gray langurs, smooth-coated otters and Indian giant squirrels are common. Many species of birds are found in the sanctuary including the distinctive heart-spotted woodpecker, rufous woodpecker, and brown-capped pygmy woodpecker, Asian fairy bluebird, Malabar pied hornbill, long-tailed nightjar and crested goshawk. Large Indian pythons and Spectacled cobras are found here. An endemic Toad Bufo koyanansis has its only habitat in this protected area.

== Threats ==
The sanctuary now has 215 windmills and 10 tourist resorts. An earthen dam is under construction and many trees have been felled. Land inside the sanctuary has been sold. More than 900 land deals have been finalised since 1985.

== Gallery ==
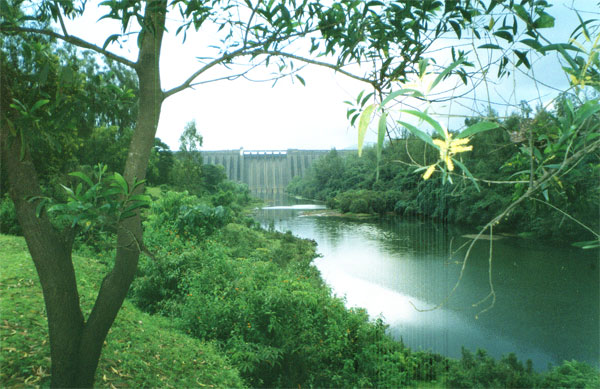
Koyna Dam and Reservoir

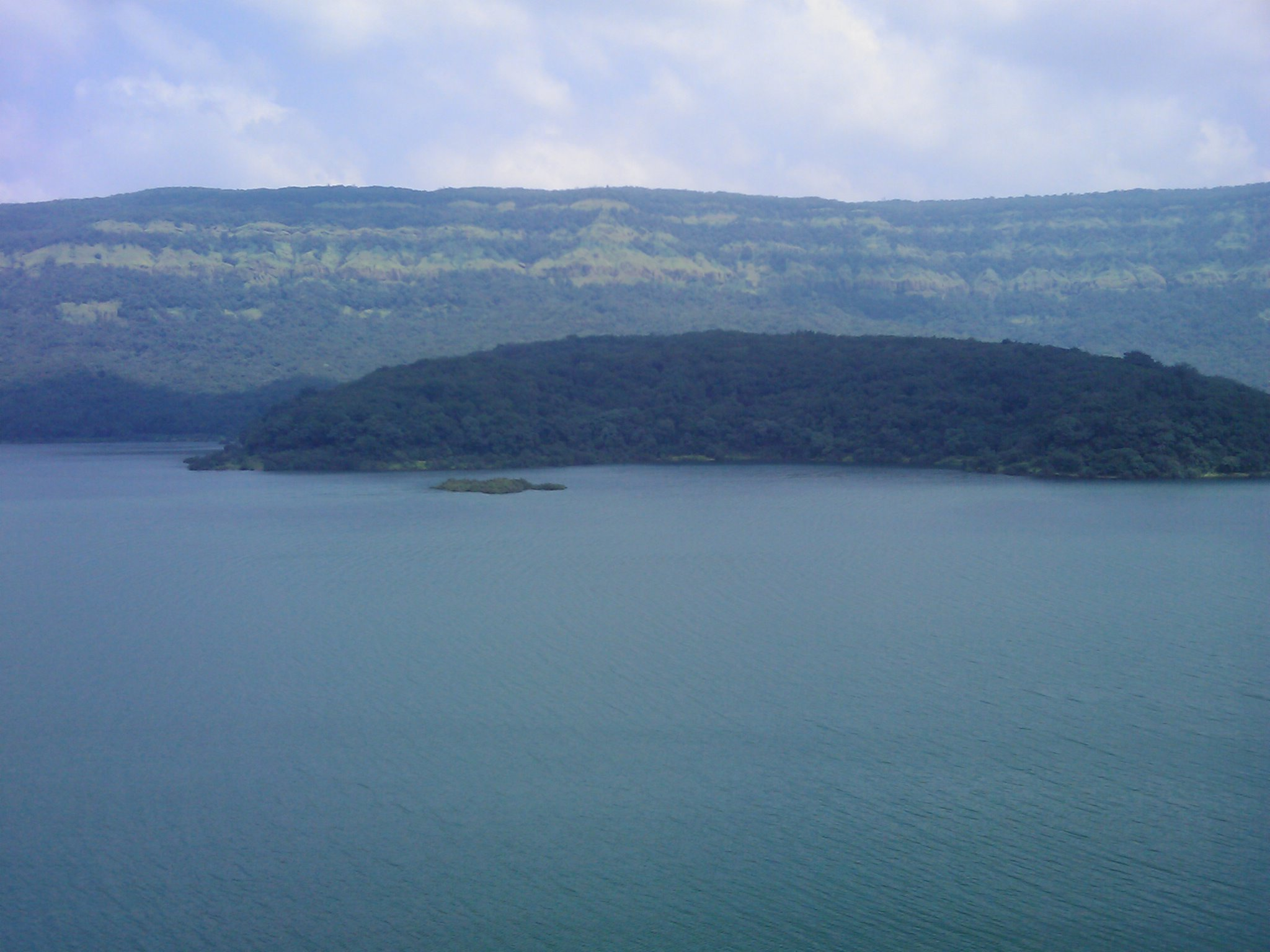
Shivsagar Lake

== See also ==
- Koyna Hydroelectric Project
- Vashishti River
