= Vasota Fort =

Fort in Maharashtra, India

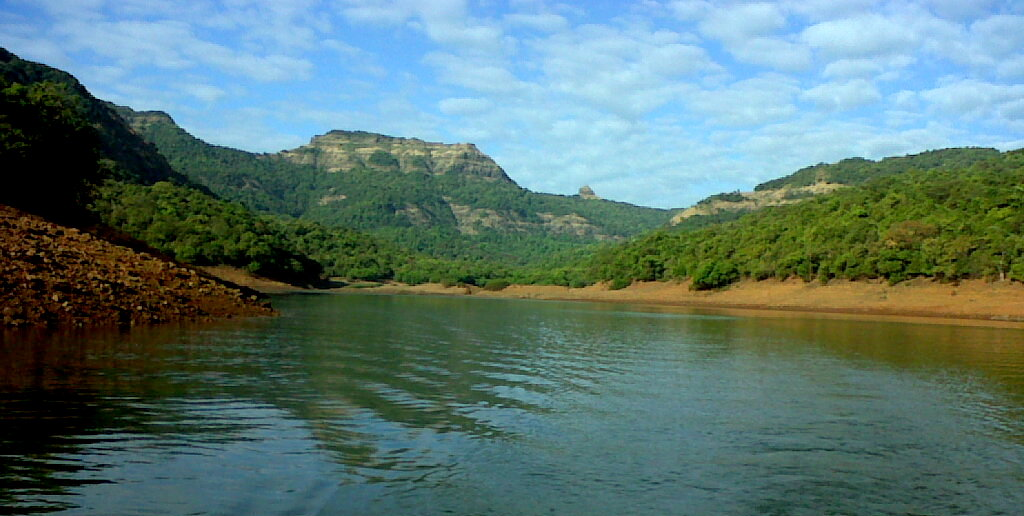
- Vasota fort from Met indavli

Site information
- Owner: Government of India
- Open to the public: Yes

Location
- Location within Maharashtra
- Coordinates: 17°39′47.9″N 73°41′48.9″E
- Height: 3814 feet

Site history
- Built: Bhoj Raja of Panhala
- Materials: Stone

Vasota Fort (also called Vyaghragad) is located in Satara district in the Indian state of Maharashtra.

== History ==
It was famously defended by Tai Telin a mistress of Pant Pratinidhi a killedar of the fort when he was captured.

Vasota fort is attributed to the Kolhapur Shilahara Chief Bhoja II (1178–1193) of Panhala. Vasota always remained with Marathas, Shirkes & Mores in 16th century.It was mostly used as a prison.

Chatrapati Shivaji incorporated the fort into the Maratha Empire in 1655 during the conquest of Javli. Chatrapati Shivaji renamed the fort "Vyaghragad" (Vyaghra – means tiger), owing to its difficult natural defense.

In 1818 the British bombarded the fort with heavy artillery, destroying many buildings on Vasota (Chandika mandir, Daru-kothar, etc.) and looted property worth 5 lakhs.

== Places to see ==
The fort is in dilapidated condition and is overgrown. The remnants of Shree Mahadev mandir and the plinth of a huge "sadar" (discussion place) are there. It is a protected natural reserve.

== Location ==
Vasota Fort is located about 70 km from satara near Bamnoli village on the banks of Shivsagar lake.

== See also ==
- Vasota Fort Info
- [https://www.bio.iitb.ac.in/~roop/travels/vasota/

Vasota trek notes -- Roop Mallik]

- List of forts in Maharashtra
