= 1967 Koynanagar earthquake =

Earthquake in India

- Location within India
- UTC time: 1967-12-10 22:51:23
- ISC event: 828259
- USGS-ANSS: ComCat
- Local date: 11 December 1967
- Local time: 04:21 am
- Magnitude: 6.6 M_{w}
- Depth: 15 km (9 mi)
- Epicenter: 17.41°N 73.86°E
- Areas affected: India
- Total damage: $400,000
- Max. intensity: MMI VIII (Severe)
- Casualties: 177–180 dead 2,272 injured

The 1967 Koynanagar earthquake occurred near Koynanagar town in Maharashtra, India on 11 December local time. The magnitude 6.6 shock hit with a maximum Mercalli intensity of VIII (Severe). It occurred near the site of Koyna dam, raising questions about induced seismicity, and claimed at least 177 lives and injured over 2,200.

== Damage ==
More than 80% of the houses were damaged in Koyana Nagar Township, but it did not cause any major damage to the dam except some cracks which were quickly repaired. There have been several earthquakes of smaller magnitude there since 1967. The earthquake caused a 10–15 cm (3.9–5.9 in) fissure in the ground which spread over a length of 25 kilometers (16 mi). Some geologists believe that the earthquake was due to reservoir-triggered seismic activity, but senior project officials have repeatedly denied this conclusion.

== See also ==
- List of earthquakes in 1967
- List of earthquakes in India
