= Dajipur =

Village in Maharashtra

Dajipur Dajipur wildlife sanctuary
- wildlife tourist place
- Location in Maharashtra, India Dajipur (India)
- Coordinates: 16.383673°N 73.863506°E
- Country: India
- State: Maharashtra
- District: Kolhapur

Languages
  - Official: Marathi
- Time zone: UTC+5:30 (IST)
- Telephone code: 9604113743
- Vehicle registration: MH-
- Nearest city: Kolhapur
- Lok Sabha constituency: Kolhapur
- Website: www.dajipur.in

Dajipur is a small village about 490 km (300 mi) from Mumbai on the road connecting the NH 17 and Kolhapur about 40 km from Radhanagari. It is best known for the Bison wildlife sanctuary and the Gagangiri Maharaj in Gaganbawda. Dajipur is famous for Dajipur Wildlife Sanctuary. Dajipur Wildlife Sanctuary is a protected area located in the Indian state of Maharashtra. It is situated in the Sahyadri mountain range and covers an area of about 120 km^{2}. The sanctuary was established in 1985 with the aim of protecting the biodiversity of the region, especially the Indian bison (also known as gaur), which is the flagship species of the sanctuary. Apart from the Indian bison, the sanctuary is also home to a wide variety of other wildlife such as leopard, sloth bear, wild boar, sambar deer, barking deer, giant squirrel, and a variety of bird species. The sanctuary is also known for its scenery, with green forests, waterfalls, and streams. Visitors can take a safari ride in the sanctuary to spot the wildlife, or go on a trek to explore the forest trails. The sanctuary also has accommodation facilities for visitors who stay overnight.
