= Sahyadri Tiger Reserve =

Wildlife sanctuary in Maharashtra, India

sahaydri evergreen forest
- Location within Maharashtra Location within India
- Location: Satara, Sangli and Ratnagiri, Maharashtra, India
- Coordinates: 17°29′10″N 73°48′33″E
- Area: 1,166 km^{2} (450 sq mi)
- Created: 2008
- Governing body: Government of India, Ministry of Environment and Forests

Sahyadri Tiger Reserve is a reserve in the state of Maharashtra, created by the Indian government in 2008. Located in the Sahyadri Ranges of the Western Ghats of Maharashtra, it is part of the ecoregions of North Western Ghats moist deciduous forests and North Western Ghats montane rain forests. These ranges form a common boundary between Maharashtra, Karnataka and Goa, and constitute rich evergreen, semi-evergreen and moist deciduous forests. The area is spread over the four districts of Satara (Mahabaleshwar, Medha, Satara and Patan tahasils), Sangli (Shirala tahasil), Kolhapur (Shauwadi Radhanagari Gaganbawadatahasil) and Ratnagiri (Sangameshwar, Chiplun and Khed tahasils).

== Area ==
The reserve spreads over Koyna Wildlife Sanctuary forming the northern portion and Chandoli National Park forming the southern part of the reserve. Recently reserve is extended towards Radhanagari Wildlife Sanctuary.

The total area of the tiger reserve is:

- Core Area: 600.12 km^{2} (231.71 mi^{2})
- Buffer Area: 565 km^{2} (218 mi^{2})
- Total Area: 1,166 km^{2} (450 mi^{2})

== Fauna ==
The reserve is dedicated to the conservation of the Bengal tiger. On 23 and 24 May 2018, a tiger was photographed in a camera trap in Chandoli, the first direct evidence of tigers in the reserve in eight years. Prior to that, in 2014, scat DNA and model-based predictions were used to estimate that the reserve had 5–8 tigers. Other animals their include the leopard.

Now there are total 10 tigers according to official Records, Tigress (Chanda) STR4, (Tara) STR5 and (Hirakani) STR6 are brought from Tadoba Andhari Tiger Reserve and Pench Tiger Reserve While Tiger (Senapati) STR1, (Baji) STR2,(Subhedar) STR3, STR7 (Raiba), STR8 (Sardar), STR 9 (Shiledar) and STR10 (Ranoji) are present.

== See also ==
- Tiger poaching in India
- Tiger reserves of India
- Vashishti River
- Wildlife of India
