= Koyna Hydroelectric Project =

Power plant in India

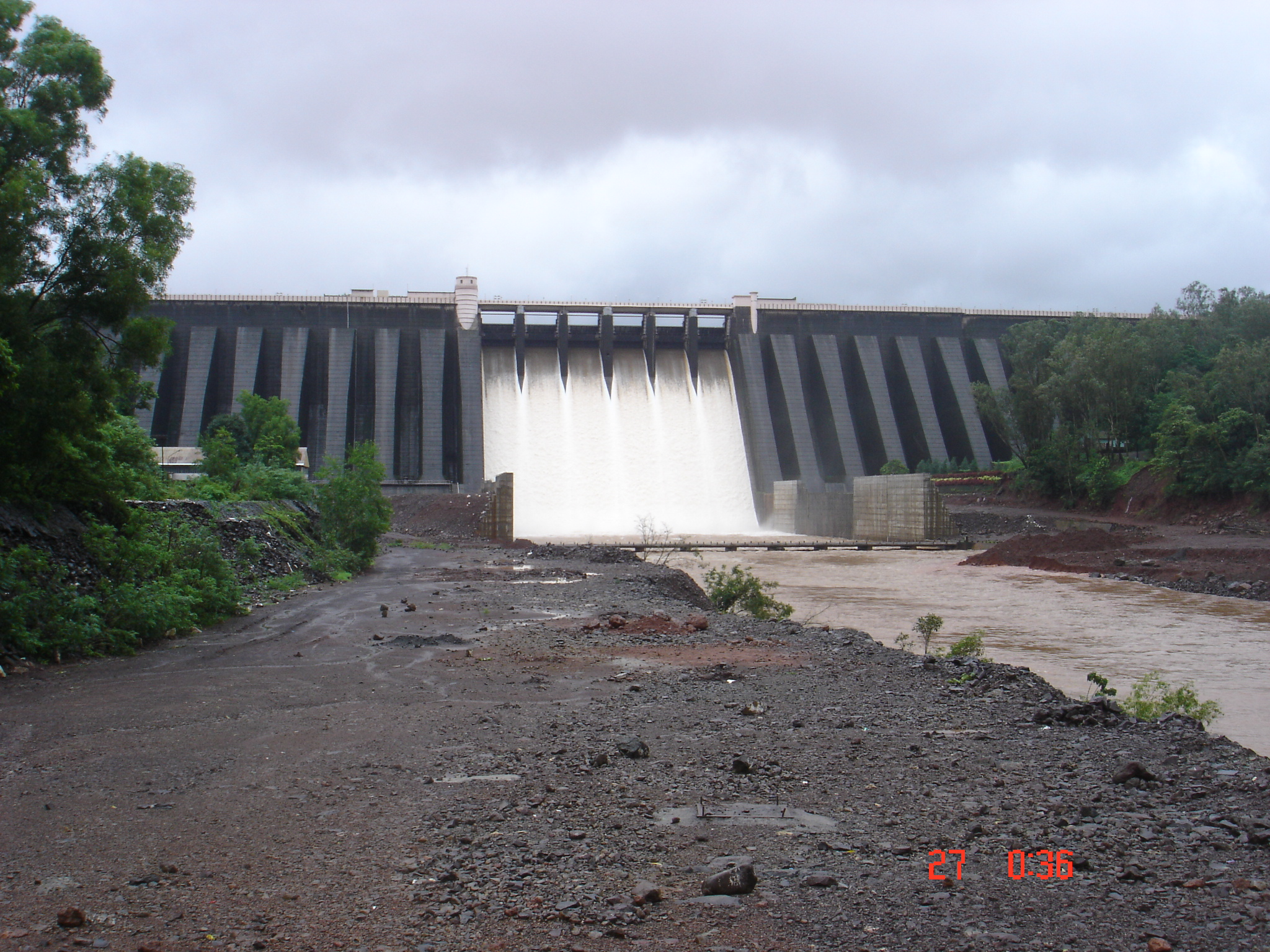
- Koyna Dam
- Country: India
- Location: Satara district, Maharashtra, India
- Coordinates: 17°24′06″N 73°45′05″E
- Status: Operational
- Construction began: 1954
- Owners: Maharashtra State Water Resources Dept, Chief Engineer Electrical, Govt of Maharashtra
- Operator: Maharashtra State Power Generation Company ltd

External links
- Website: www.koynaproject.org
- Commons: Related media on Commons

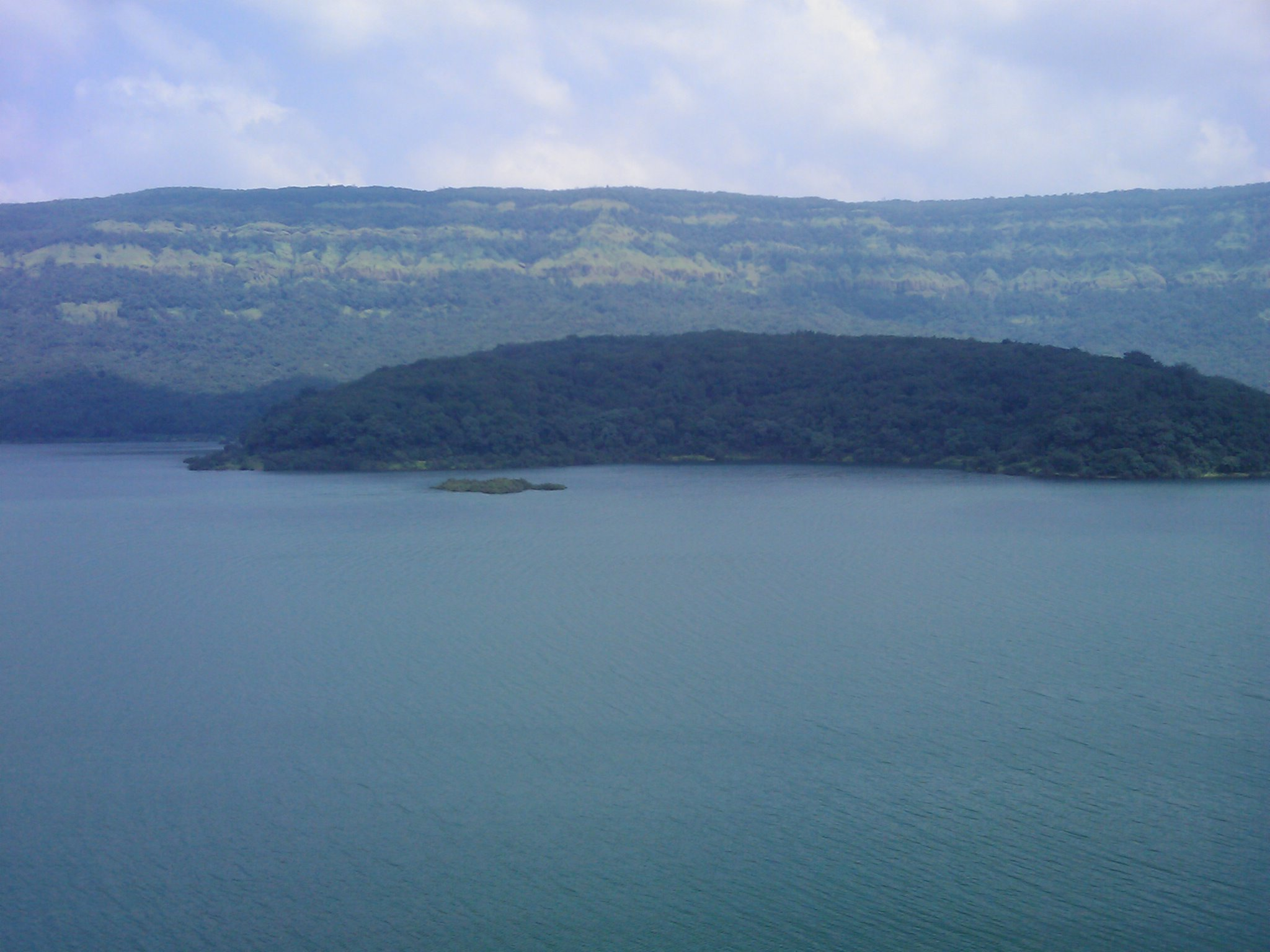
Shivasagar lake

The Koyna Hydroelectric Project is the largest hydroelectric power plant in India. It is a complex project with four dams including the largest dam on the Koyna River, Maharashtra, hence the name Koyna Hydroelectric Project. The project site is in Satara district.

The Koyana Dam is situated near Koyananagar village. On river Koyana.

The total capacity of the project is 1,960 MW. The project consists of four stages of power generation. All the generators are located in underground powerhouses excavated deep inside the mountains of the Western Ghats. A dam foot powerhouse also contributes to the electricity generation. Due to the project's electricity generating potential the Koyna River is considered as the life line of Maharashtra. The Sharavathi Pumped Storage Hydropower Project would be a larger project of 2000MWe in southern India and outside the Koyna plant.

The project takes advantage of the height of Western Ghats. Thus a very large hydraulic head is available over a very short distance.

== History ==
In the early 20th century, there was a survey of the Koyna River as a potential hydro-electric source. After the First World War, a hydro-electric project on the Koyna river was investigated by the Tata Group. The 1928 financial crisis caused the project to be shelved. In 1951 Koyna Dam division started to look into the project. The project was approved in 1953 and work commenced in early 1954. The second stage of the project was made using a World Bank loan (Project loan number 24-IN).

== Description ==
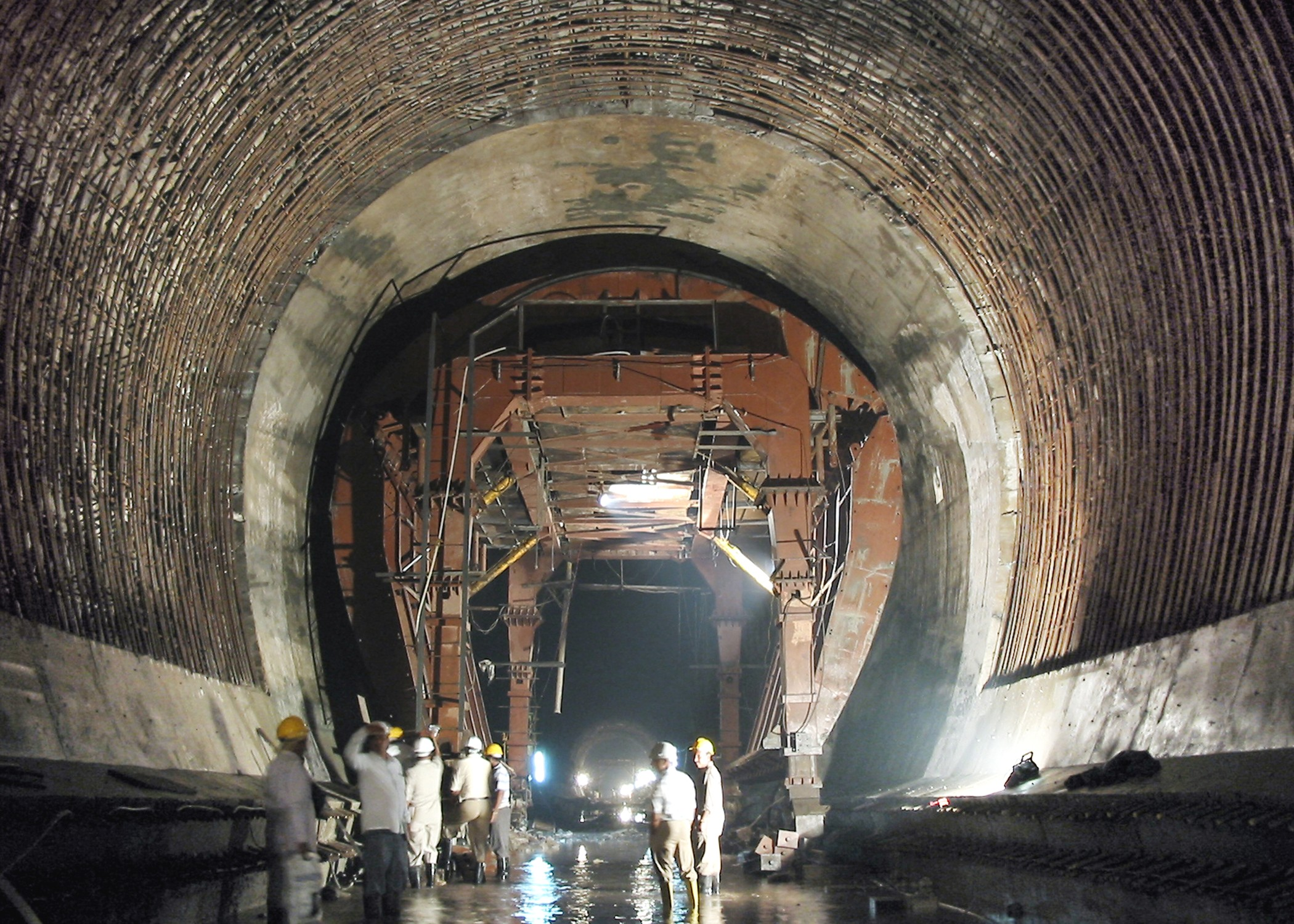
Head race tunnel

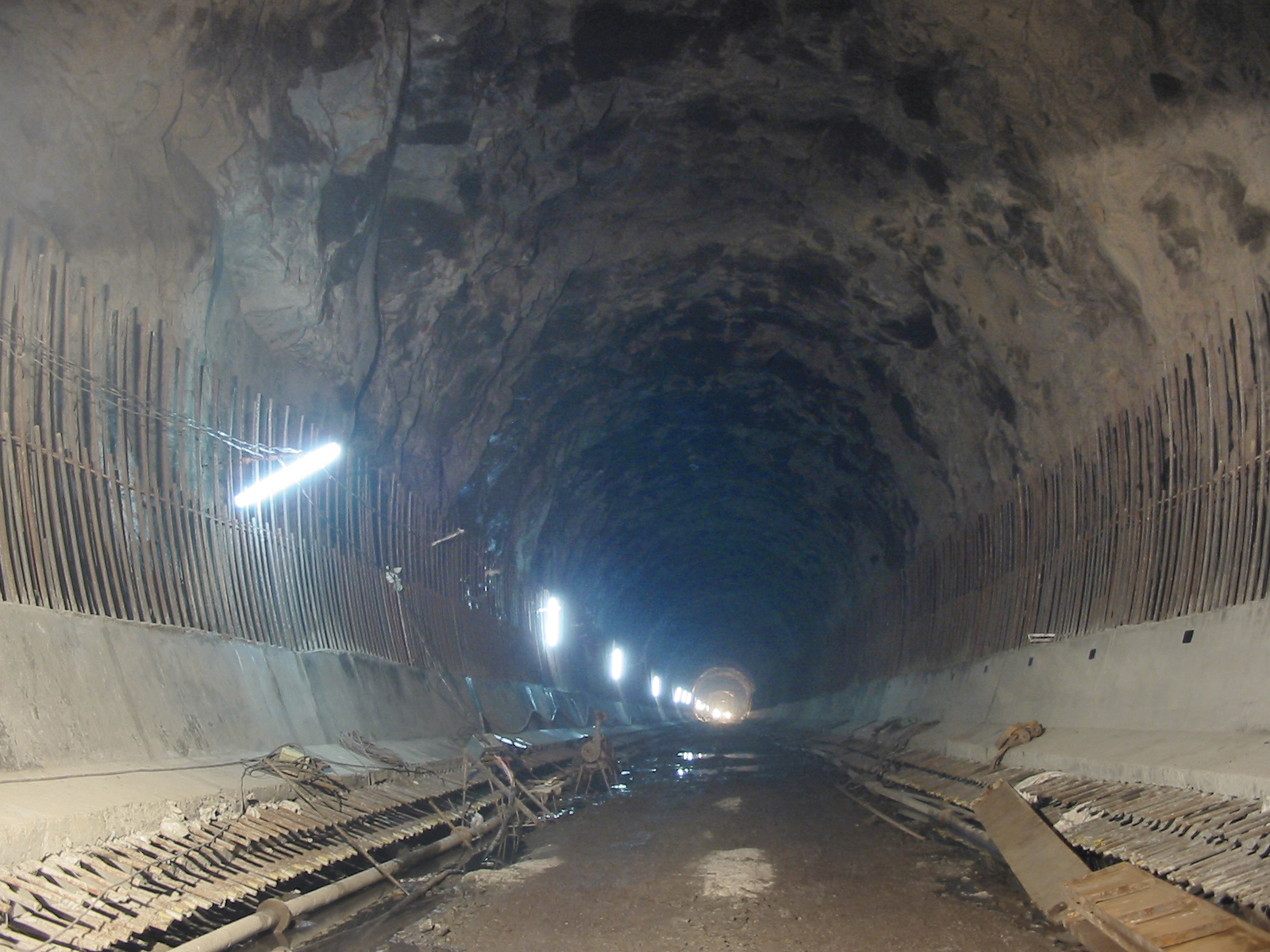
Head race tunnel

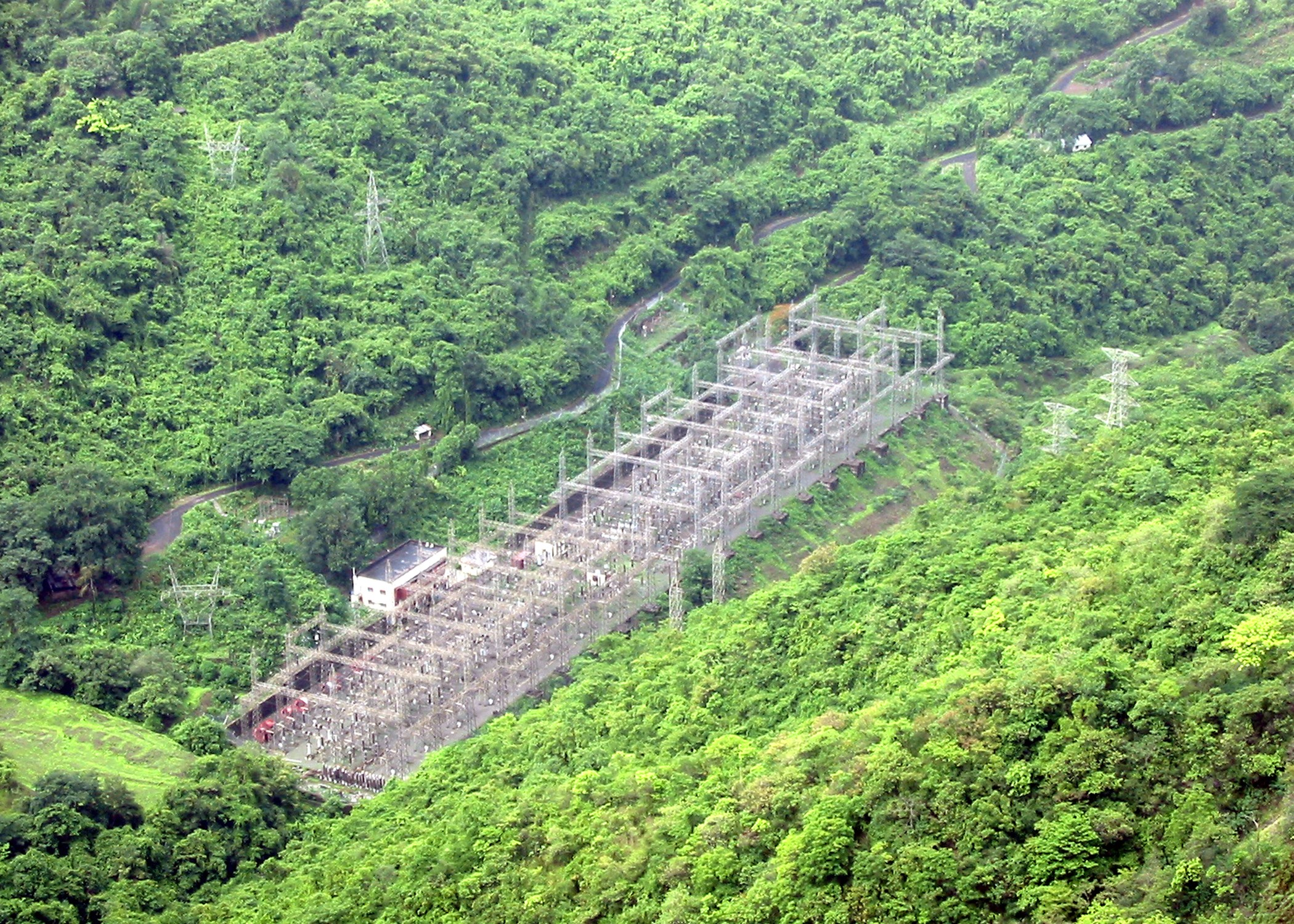
Outdoor switchyard

The project is composed of four dams with the major contributors being the Koyna Dam and Kolkewadi Dam. The water from Shivasagar reservoir was formed by the Koyna Dam and is used in the 1st, 2nd and 4th stages. This water is drawn from head race tunnels situated below the reservoir. Then it travels through vertical pressure shafts to the underground powerhouses. The discharged water from these stages is collected and stored in Kolkewadi Dam situated near village of Alore. The water is drawn from the penstocks of Kolkewadi Dam to an underground power station in the 3rd stage and then discharged to the Arabian Sea.

The electricity generated in all the stages is delivered to the main electrical grid. The project is run by the Maharashtra State Electricity Board.

Stage	Unit number	Installed capacity (MW)	Date of commissioning	Status
Stage I	1	70	1962 May	Running
Stage I	2	70	1962 August	Running
Stage I	3	70	1963 January	Running
Stage I	4	70	1963 February	Running
Stage II	5	80	1967 June	Running
Stage II	6	80	1966 November	Running
Stage II	7	80	1966 June	Running
Stage II	8	80	1966 March	Running
Stage III	9	80	1975 July	Running
Stage III	10	80	1976 January	Running
Stage III	11	80	1977 May	Running
Stage III	12	80	1977	Running
Stage IV	13	250	1981	Running
Stage IV	14	250	1981	Running
Stage IV	15	250	1981	Running
Stage IV	16	250	1981	Running

Besides this dam foot powerhouse part of power plant also produces 40 MW through two generating units of 20 MW each, totalling 1960 MW. Details of each stage are given below.

=== Stage I and II ===
The first stage of the project was approved in late 1953 and construction began in early 1954. Initially a two-stage construction was conceived. But the total generation capacity of the two stages was too large for load forecasts of that time. So a time lag of more than 10 years was proposed between the two stages. Within two years thereafter, it came to be noticed that the 10 years time tag between these two stages will not be affordable and to cope up with the power requirements, the two stages should be merged and both the stages should be constructed simultaneously. Hence, it was accepted that the two stages have to be executed as one.

The 1st and 2nd stages share same powerhouse with total eight Pelton turbine units. Each of the two stages has four turbines having capacity of 65 MW each for 1st stage and 75 MW each for 2nd stage. The water from Shivasagar reservoir is taken through an intake structure known as Navja tower near village of Navja into the head race tunnel. Then it travels towards the surge tank. It is further divided into four pressure shafts which run vertically downward delivering water to the turbines. Then the water is discharged into the tail race tunnel.

A dam foot powerhouse was also constructed which is used to generate electricity by the water which is discharged from the Koyna Dam for irrigation purpose. It has two Francis turbine units of 20 MW each. This powerhouse is run according to the irrigation requirements of the downstream areas.

The combined installed capacity of the two stages and the dam foot powerhouse is 600 MW.

=== Stage III ===
Initially a weir was proposed to divert the water coming out of tail race tunnel of Stage I and II. But it was later observed that the water still had a hydraulic head of about 120 m which could be used. To use this head, the Kolkewadi Dam was constructed at this location. It forms a balancing reservoir and maintains the head. This dam impounds the tail race water from Stage I and II. This water is drawn through penstocks and electricity is generated by four Francis turbine units with a capacity of 80 MW each. The tail race water from these stages then flows through a channel and joins the Arabian Sea near Chiplun.

The installed generating capacity of this stage is 320 MW.

=== Stage IV ===
Later in the 1980s, the electricity demand of the Maharashtra increased tremendously resulting in inadequate power supply. The Planning Commission accorded approval to Stage IV with installation capacity of 4 × 250 MW. Thus, one more stage called Stage IV was added to power system of Stages I and II, thus converting the Koyna Power Station into a peaking power station complex with load factor of about 18.7%. This scheme also draws water from the existing Shivasagar reservoir same as Stages I and II.

A nonconventional intake system was created by piercing the lake from the bottom by blasting the rock plug using dynamite. This double lake tapping process was the first of its kind in Asia.

The water in head race tunnel is directly drawn from the reservoir and delivered to the head surge tank. Then four pressure shafts take the water downward vertically. The four huge Francis turbine units of 250 MW each generate electricity and tail race water is taken into the Kolkewadi Dam reservoir through tail race tunnel. A revolutionary gas insulated switchgear system is used in the underground powerhouse of this stage.

The installed capacity of this stage alone is 1000 MW. This stage is mostly used to cater for the peak hour demands of the electric grid.

== Features ==
	Stage I & II	Stage III	Stage IV
Dam
Catchment area	891.78 km^{2} (344 sq mi)	25.04 km^{2} (10 sq mi)	Capacity of stage I & II is utilised
Capacity	2797 MCM	36 MCM	Capacity of stage I & II is utilised
Max. height above foundation	103.02 m	63.30 m	Capacity of stage I & II is utilised
Length	807.72 m	497.00 m	Capacity of stage I & II is utilised
Intake works
Head race tunnel length	3748 m	4551 m	4230 m
Intake tunnel diameter	6.4 m circular	7.4 m D shape	7 m × 9.50 m horseshoe shape
Discharge capacity	164 m^{3}/s	170 m^{3}/s	260 m^{3}/s
Pressure shafts
Number	4	4	4
Length(each)	616 m	192 m	590 m
Power house
Approach tunnel length	864 m	780 m	988 m
Tail race tunnel length	2215 m	4543 m	2314 m
Number of turbines	4 (stage I) + 4 (stage II) + 2 (dam foot powerhouse) = 10	4	4
Type of turbine	Pelton (stage I & II) Francis (dam foot powerhouse)	Francis	Francis
Installed generation capacity	600 MW	320 MW	1000 MW
Switch yard	4572 m	340 m	134 m × 18 m underground
Load factor	60%	24%	18% (1 + 2 & 4)

- This is the largest completed hydroelectric project in India.
- The water used for generation of electricity joins the Arabian Sea near Chiplun while the water which discharges through the spillways of the dam in monsoon season joins the Bay of Bengal through the Krishna River.
- The process of double lake tapping was the first of its kind in Asia.
- All the components of the project such as powerhouses, head race and tail race tunnels, pressure shafts are constructed underground.
- The modern gas insulated switchgear system is used in 4th stage of the project.

== Future plans ==
To utilise more water from the Shivasagar reservoir, another dam foot powerhouse is being constructed on the left bank of the dam. This powerhouse will employ a pumped storage scheme. Also lake tapping is proposed for the intake system.

== Tourism ==
The impounded water of the Koyna Dam though has submerged a significant amount of rain forest of the Western Ghats, it has helped a lot to the surrounding forest by supplying water all round the year. Hence a wide biodiversity of plants and animals is observed in the evergreen forest surrounding the reservoir area.

=== Koyna Wildlife Sanctuary ===
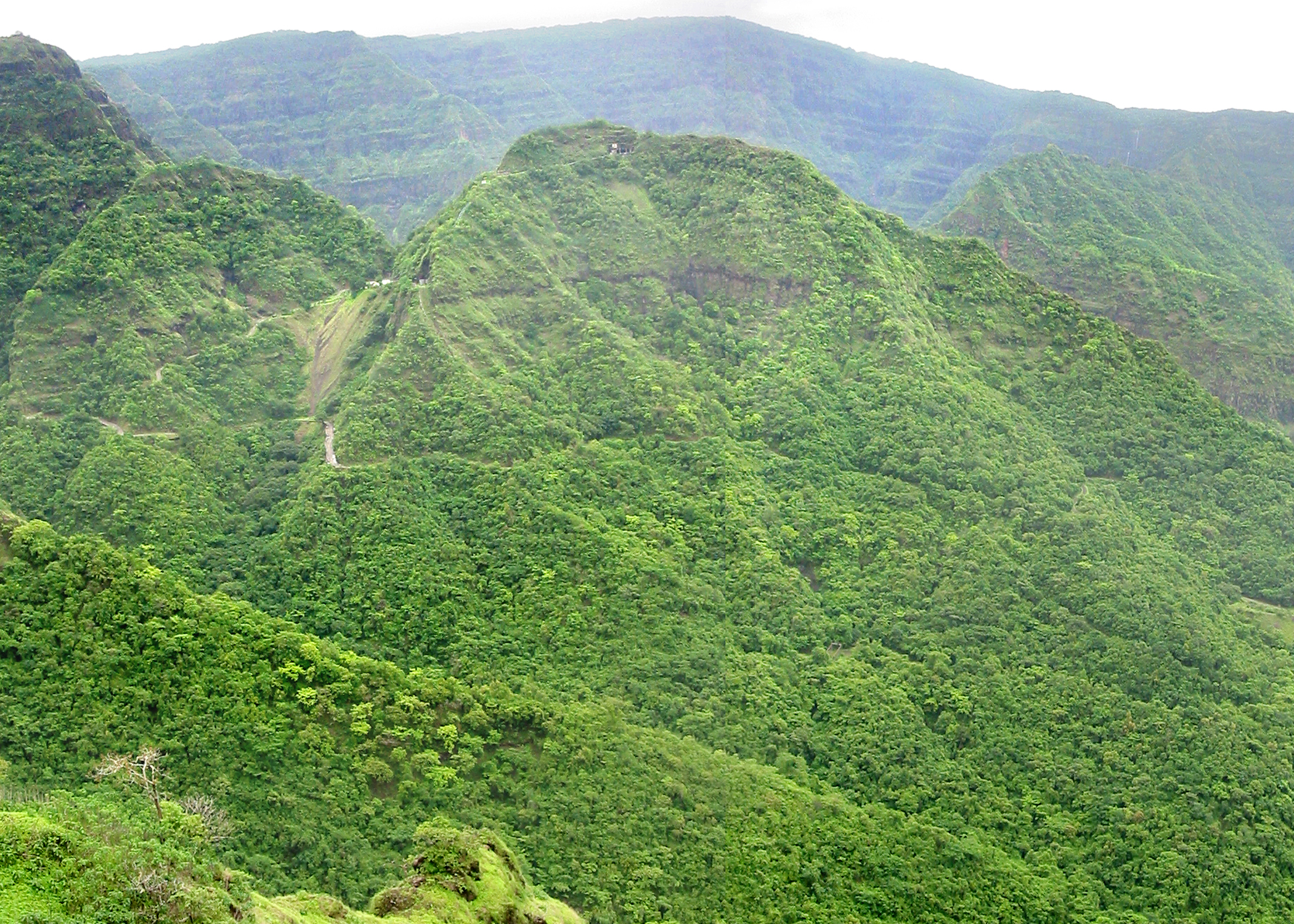
A part of the evergreen forest in surrounding area of the project

Koyna Wildlife Sanctuary has dense forests with three major sections, Vasota, Maharkhor and Indavli Met, and the sanctuary is endowed with natural protective boundaries – Shivasagar Lake on one side, and the slopes of the Western Ghats on both the sides. This protective cover has enabled the emergence of a diverse variety of flora and fauna in the sanctuary. Some of the endangered species of trees found in the sanctuary are Dhup (Boswellia serrata), Euphorbia longan, and Elaeocarpus spp., apart from many other species of trees. The sanctuary has a diverse variety of fauna including tigers and panthers; gaurs and sambars; barking and mouse deer; pythons and cobras; common langurs and Indian giant squirrels. Many species of birds are found in the sanctuary including brown capped woodpecker; Asian fairy bluebird; and crested goshawk.

Another attraction of the sanctuary is Vasota Fort which lies deep in the forest and is located at a height of 1,120 m (3,675 ft) above sea level. The legend states that the fort was constructed by Malwa king Raja Bhoja in 1170.

=== Nehru Memorial park ===
When the project work was nearing completion, on 10 April 1960, the then Prime Minister of India Pt. Jawaharlal Nehru visited the Koyna Project. To commemorate this event a tableau was unveiled at his gracious hands on the right flank hillock of Koyna Dam. This project came up with an idea of immortalizing this place and this event by constructing a beautiful park and naming it as "Nehru Memorial Park". This park is a major attraction for tourists. An upstream side view of dam is visible from this garden. There is an auditorium named 'Yashogatha' (meaning: story of success) which relives a small element of the tremendous efforts taken by the engineers and workers associated with project.

=== Ozarde falls ===
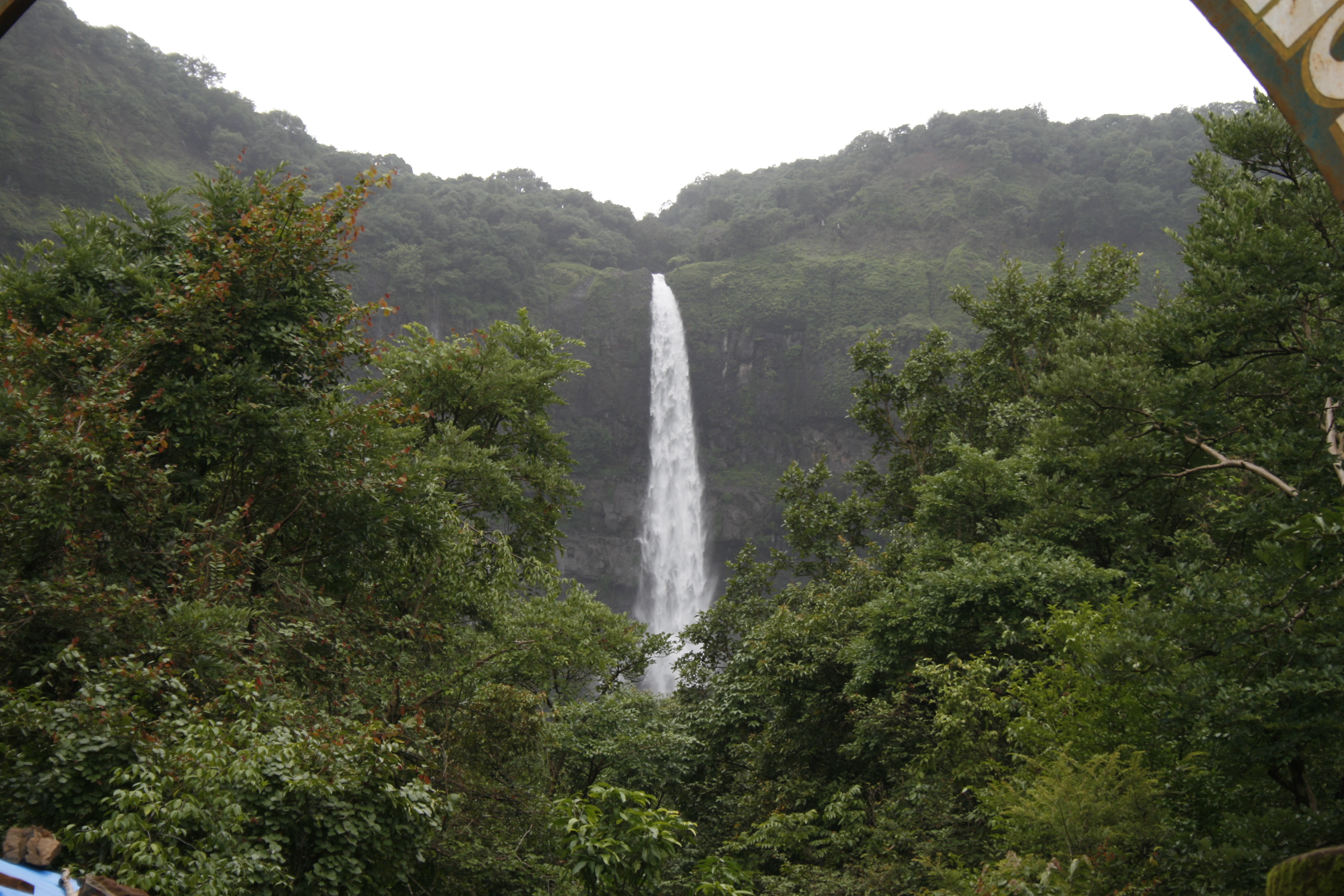
Ozarda fall

Due to the large rainfall in the hilly region surrounding the reservoir, some beautiful falls are generated in the monsoon season. The largest of them is the Ozarda falls near Navaja village 10 km from Koyna. This is also a major attraction for tourists visiting in monsoon season.

== See also ==
- Koyna Dam
- Koyna Wildlife Sanctuary
- List of power stations in India
- List of conventional hydroelectric power stations
