= Koyna River =

River in India

Koyna
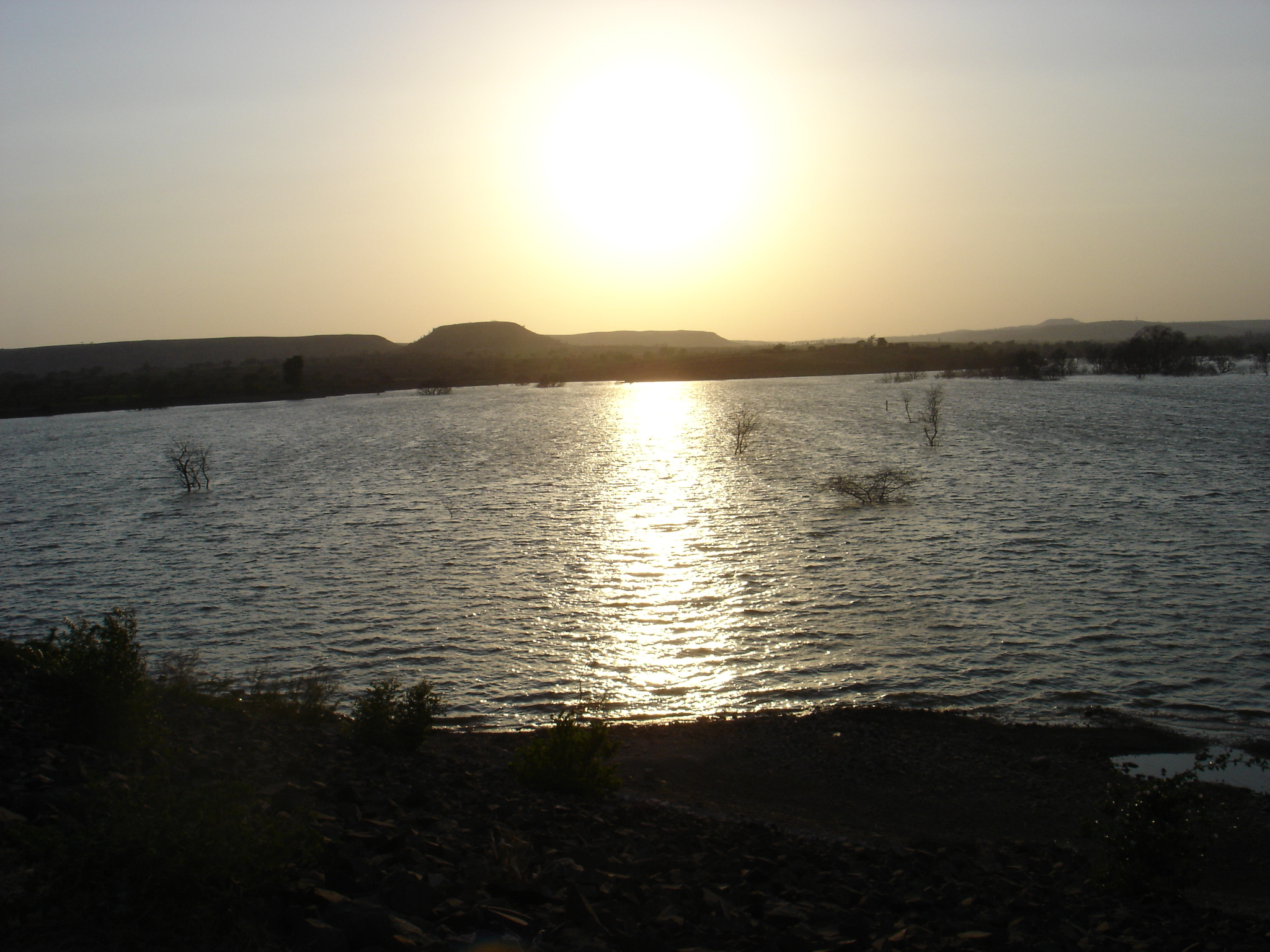
- Koyna River

Location
- Country: India
- State: Maharashtra
- District: Satara District

Physical characteristics
- Source: Hunter's Point, near Mahabaleshwar
- Mouth: Krishna River
  - location: Karad
- Length: 130 km (81 mi)

Basin features
- River system: Krishna River
- Tributaries
  - left: Kera, Solshi
  - right: Morna, Vang, Mahind
- Imponds Koyna Dam, Flows thorough Koyna Wildlife Sanctuary (Tiger reserve)

The Koyna River (Marathi pronunciation: [koːj(ə)naː]) is a tributary of the Krishna River which originates in Mahableshwar, Satara district, western Maharashtra, India. It rises near Mahabaleshwar, a hill station in the Western Ghats. Unlike most of the other rivers in Maharashtra which flow from rest to west direction, the Koyna river flows north to south. The Koyna Dam and the Koyna Hydroelectric Projectare on the river. The Koyna Hydroelectric Project is the 2nd largest completed hydroelectric project in India.

== See also ==
- List of major rivers of India
- Koyna Wildlife Sanctuary
