= North Western Ghats montane rain forests =

Ecoregion in the Indian Peninsula

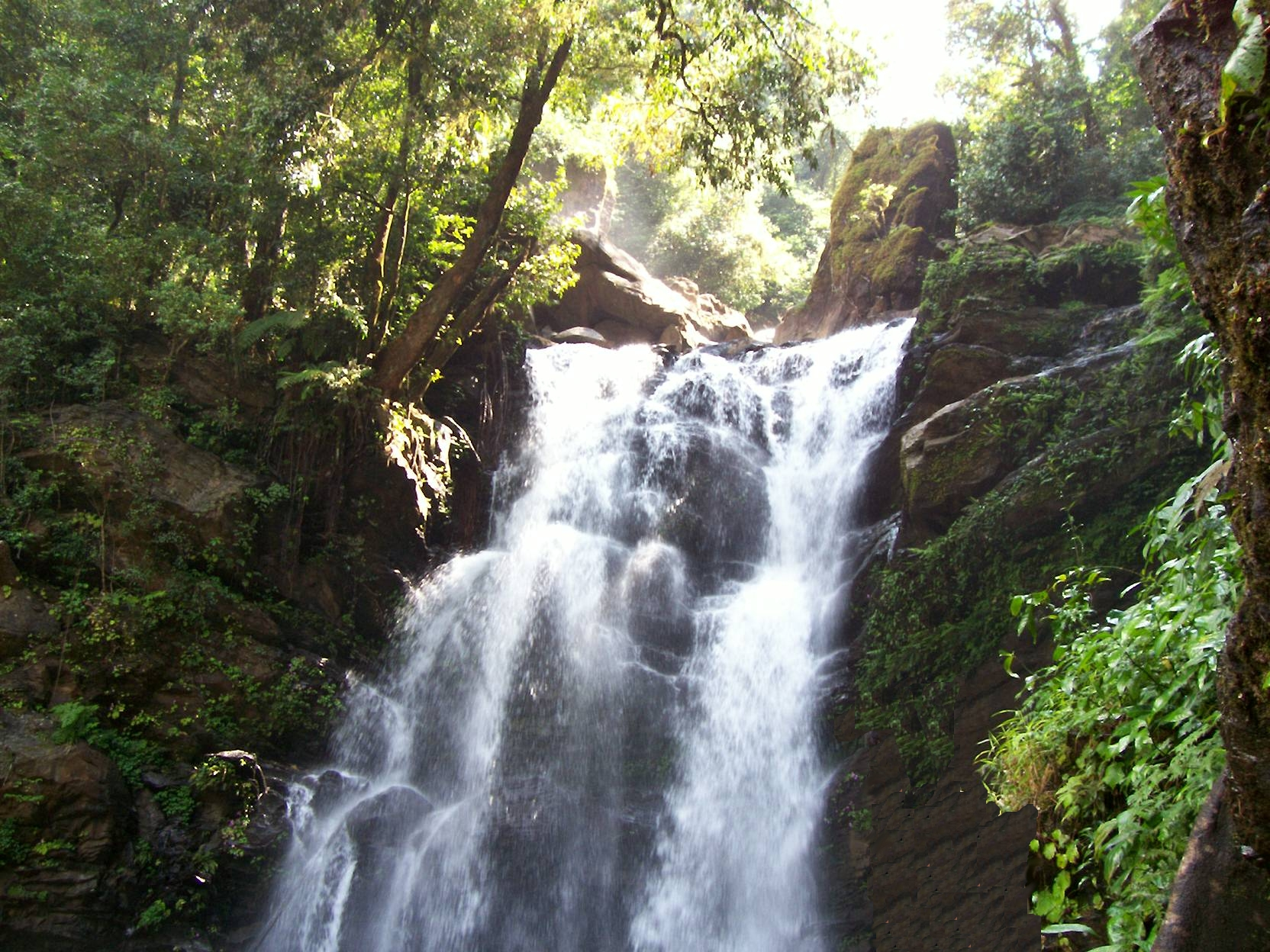
- Hanumanagudi Falls in Kudremukh National Park, Karnataka

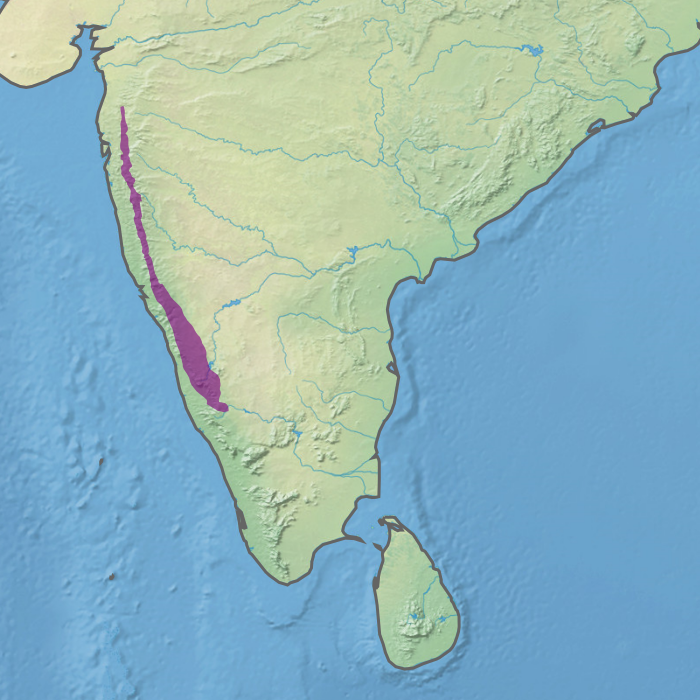
- Ecoregion territory (in purple)

Ecology
- Realm: Indomalayan
- Biome: tropical and subtropical moist broadleaf forests
- Borders: List: Deccan thorn scrub forests; Khathiar-Gir dry deciduous forests; Malabar Coast moist forests; Narmada Valley dry deciduous forests; North Western Ghats moist deciduous forests; South Deccan Plateau dry deciduous forests; South Western Ghats moist deciduous forests; South Western Ghats montane rain forests

Geography
- Area: 30,825 km^{2} (11,902 mi^{2})
- Country: India
- States: Goa; Gujarat; Karnataka; Maharashtra; Damaon, Diu & Silvassa

Conservation
- Conservation status: critical/endangered
- Protected: 5,331 km^{2} (17%)

The North Western Ghats montane rain forests is a tropical moist broadleaf forest ecoregion of southwestern Indian peninsula. It covers an area of 30,900 square kilometers (11,900 sq mi), extending down the spine of the Western Ghauts range, from southernmost Gujarat through Damaon, Maharashtra, Goa & Karnataka. The montane rain forests are found above 1000 meters elevation, and are surrounded at lower elevations by the North Western Ghats moist deciduous forests.

== Flora ==
Unlike the lowland forests, which are composed largely of deciduous trees, the montane rain forests are predominantly evergreen laurel forest, dominated by trees of the laurel family (Lauraceae), including Litsea, Phoebe, and Cinnamomum.

== Protected areas ==
A 2017 assessment found that 5,331 km^{2}, or 17%, of the ecoregion was in protected areas. Another 39% is forested but outside protected areas. As of 1997, 13 protected areas had been designated, covering an area of 3,990 km^{2}, 13% of the ecoregion's area.

- Anshi National Park, Karnataka (80 km^{2}, partly in the North Western Ghats moist deciduous forests)
- Bhadra Wildlife Sanctuary, Karnataka (200 km^{2}, partly in the North Western Ghats moist deciduous forests)
- Chandoli National Park, Maharashtra (80 km^{2}, partly in the North Western Ghats moist deciduous forests)
- Dandeli Wildlife Sanctuary, Karnataka (1,060 km^{2})
- Koyna Wildlife Sanctuary, Maharashtra (160 km^{2}, partly in the North Western Ghats moist deciduous forests)
- Kudremukh National Park, Karnataka (820 km^{2})
- Mookambika Wildlife Sanctuary, Karnataka (160 km^{2}, partly in the North Western Ghats moist deciduous forests)
- Pushpagiri Wildlife Sanctuary, Karnataka (70 km^{2}, partly in the South Western Ghats montane rain forests)
- Radhanagari Wildlife Sanctuary, Maharashtra (350 km^{2})
- Sharavati Valley Wildlife Sanctuary, Karnataka (370 km^{2}, partly in the North Western Ghats moist deciduous forests)
- Shettihalli Wildlife Sanctuary, Karnataka (470 km^{2})
- Someshwara Wildlife Sanctuary, Karnataka (40 km^{2})
- Tansa Wildlife Sanctuary, Maharashtra (130 km^{2}, partly in the North Western Ghats moist deciduous forests)

A chain of reserved forests – Kiribag, Subrahmanya, Bisle, Bhagimaldi, Kagneri, Kanchankumari, Kempuhole, Moorkannugudda, Kabbinale, Shiradi Shisla, and Miyar – extend along the spine of the Western Ghats, connecting Kudremukh National Park to Pushpagiri Wildlife Sanctuary. On 15 December 2012, the Karnataka Wildlife Board recommended that Bisle, Kaginahare, and Kanchankumari reserve forests north of Pushpagiri be included in Pushpagiri Wildlife Sanctuary. The Ministry of Environment and Forests also supported the proposal. In May 2014 wildlife biologist Sanjay Gubbi reiterated the call to include these reserve forests in the protected area, and said that "a conspiracy to make money in the name of mini-hydel projects" was the reason for the Karnataka state government's refusal to redesignate these reserve forests as a wildlife sanctuary or national park.
