= Bisle Reserve Forest =

Reserve forest in the westernmost Hassan district of Karnataka state, India

Coordinates: 12.732°N 75.677°E

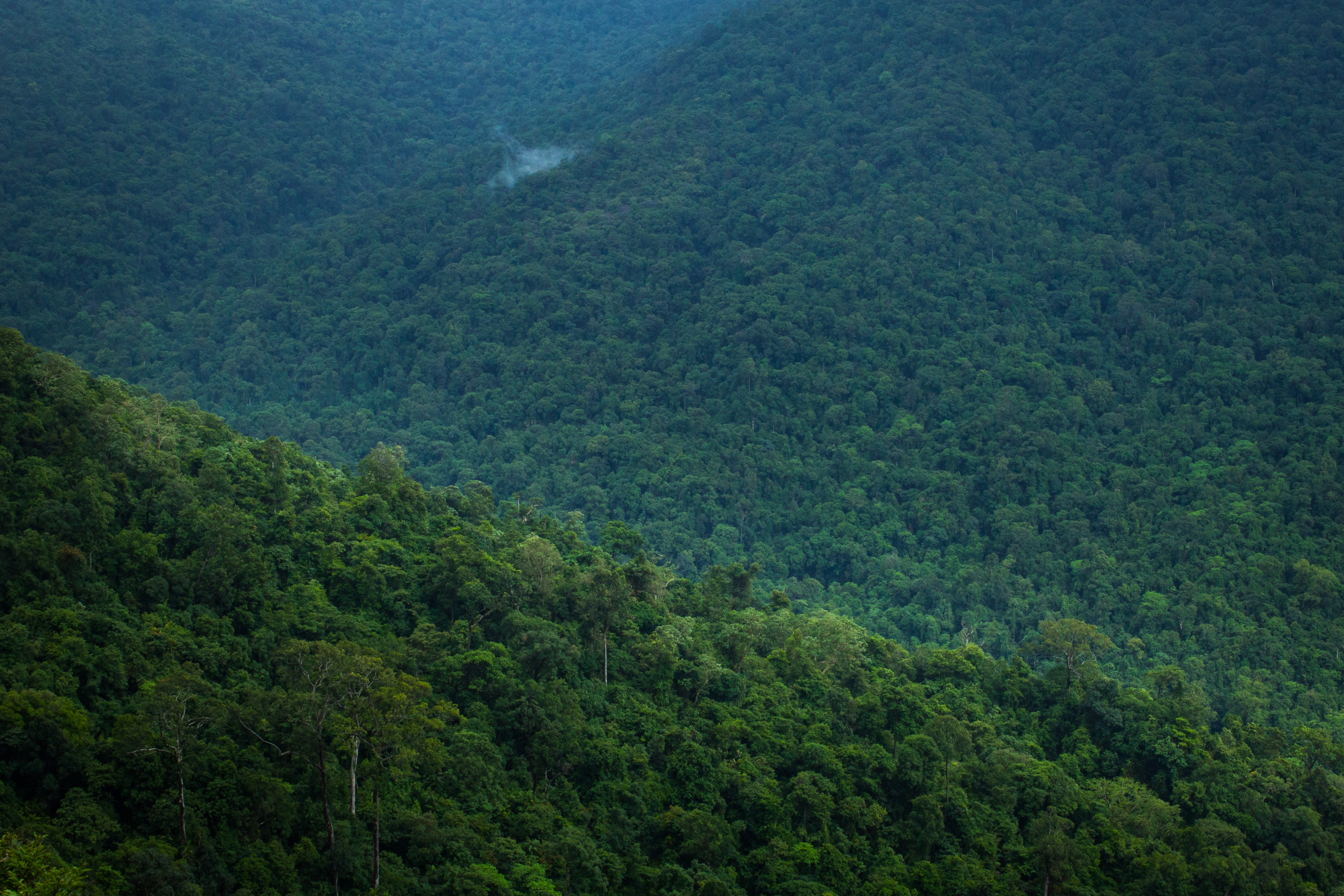
View of Bisle Forest

Bisle Reserve Forest is a reserve forest in westernmost Hassan district of Karnataka state, India. It is located in Hassan district's Sakleshpur taluk. Bisle village adjoins the forest to the east. It is contiguous with Kagneri Reserve Forest to the north, Bhagimale Reserve Forest of Dakshina Kannada district to the west, and Kukke Subramanya forest range to the southwest. To the south it adjoins Pushpagiri Wildlife Sanctuary in Kodagu district. Bisle Reserve forest and the reserve forests extending north along the Bisle Ghat range form a natural corridor linking Pushpagiri Wildlife Sanctuary and Kudremukh National Park.

The Kumaradhara River, a tributary of the Netravati, runs through the reserve forest from east to west, creating a pass through the Western Ghats. Bisle Ghat Road follows the Kumaradhara, linking Hassan district with Dakshina Kannada district and the valley of the Netravati.

Around 5 km west of Bisle is scenic spot of Bisle called Bisle Betta or Bisle View Point. From here one can see the mountain ranges of 3 districts: Kumara Parvatha (1319 m) of Dakshina Kannada district, Pushpagiri (1712 m) and Dodda Betta (1119 m) of Kodagu district, and Patta Betta (1112 m) and Enni Kallu (900 m) of Hassan district. The highlight of this point is that the view has a valley, with Giri River separating the beauty point and these mountain ranges. The forest department has erected a viewing platform with a sun-shade to sit and enjoy the view. In addition to the view point, the forest department has built and maintains a few other facilities in the forest:

- A check post & related residential hutments at Budi Choudi.
- Three km ahead of Budi Choudi, a reception room on the roadside.
- Down on the riverside of Addahole few Dormitories with a rope bridge.
- An inspection bungalow at Addahole bridge.

The reserve forest is part of the North Western Ghats montane rain forests ecoregion. The forest's steep slopes have deterred logging, and it is home to tracts of intact Dipterocarp forests that preserve the ecoregion's native biodiversity.

The thick forest is home of king cobras, tigers (rarely seen), Sambar deer, peacocks, numerous species of birds, Spotted deer, brown fox and Mahasheer fish, not to mention a number of flora and fauna which can only be found in this region of Western Ghats. The rare Nilgiri marten (Martes gwatkinsii) was sighted recently in Bisle forest.

On 15 December 2012, the Karnataka Wildlife Board recommended that Bisle Reserve Forest, along with Kaginahare and Kanchankumari reserve forests to the north, be included in Pushpagiri Wildlife Sanctuary. The Ministry of Environment and Forests also supported the proposal. In May 2014 wildlife biologist Sanjay Gubbi reiterated the call to include these reserve forests in the protected area, and said that "a conspiracy to make money in the name of mini-hydel projects" was the reason for the Karnataka state government's refusal to redesignate these reserve forests as a wildlife sanctuary or national park.
