= List of peaks in the Karnataka =

List of peaks in the state of Karnataka, India

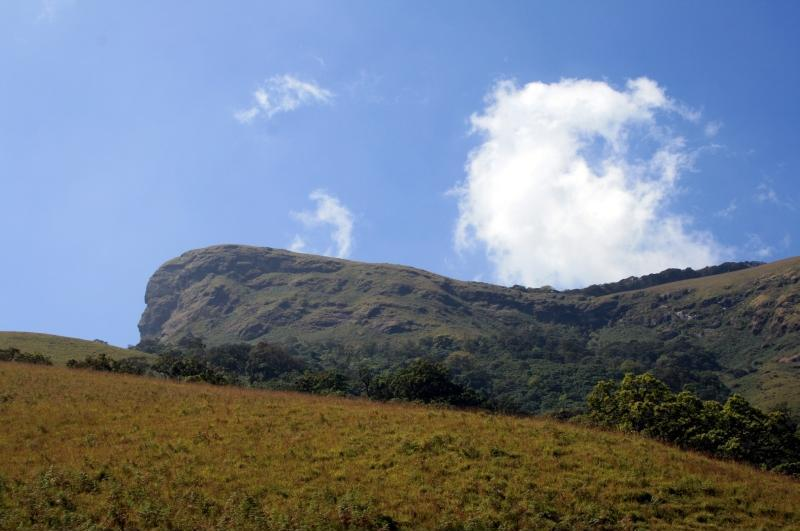
Kudremukh – the Horse Face

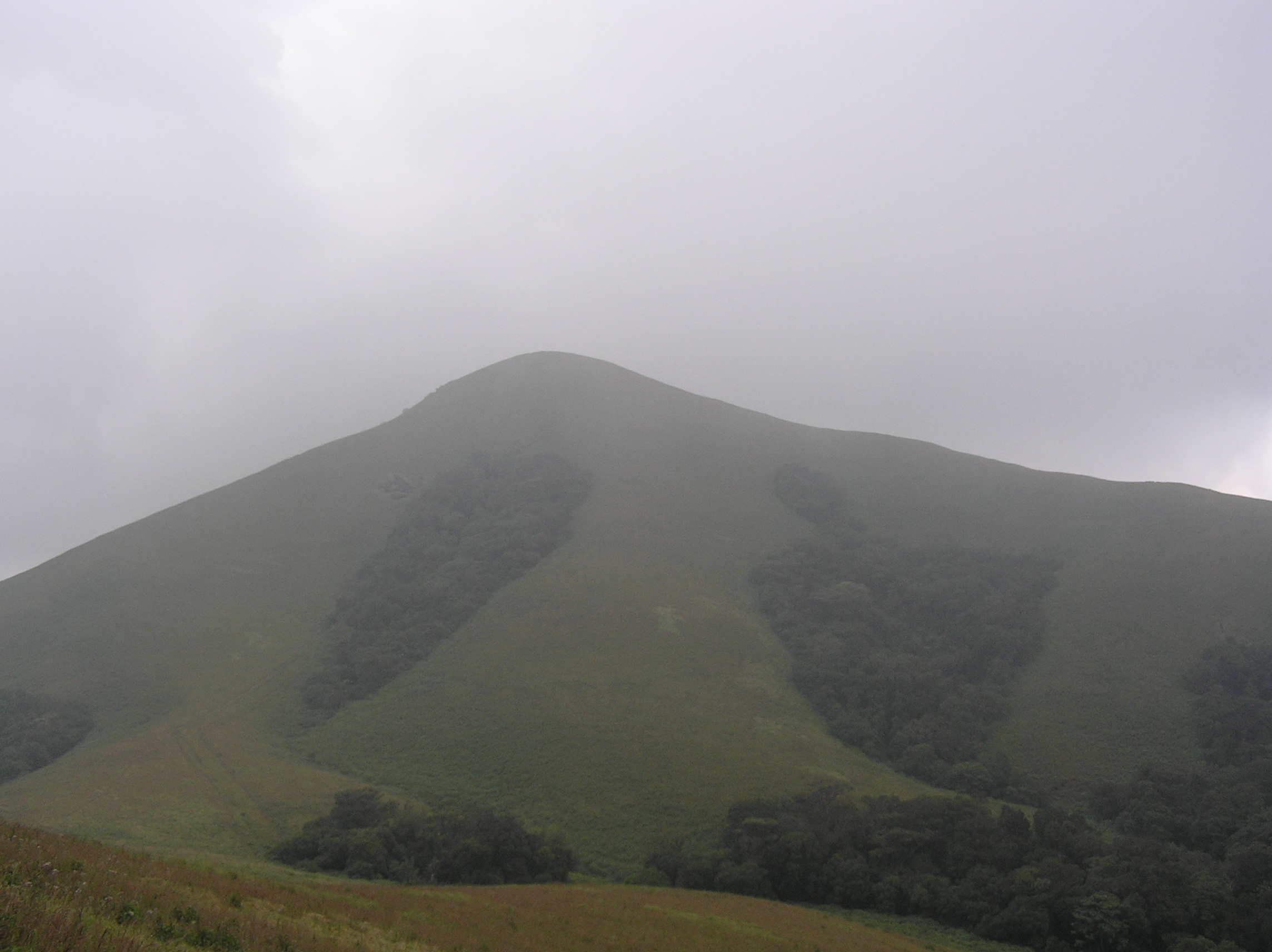
Brahmagiri Hills, on Karnataka-Kerala Border

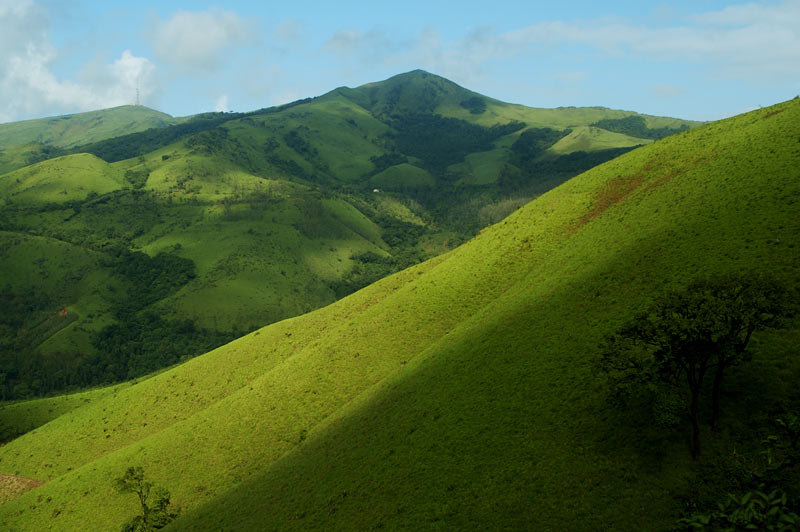
Kemmangundi Landscape with shola and grassland

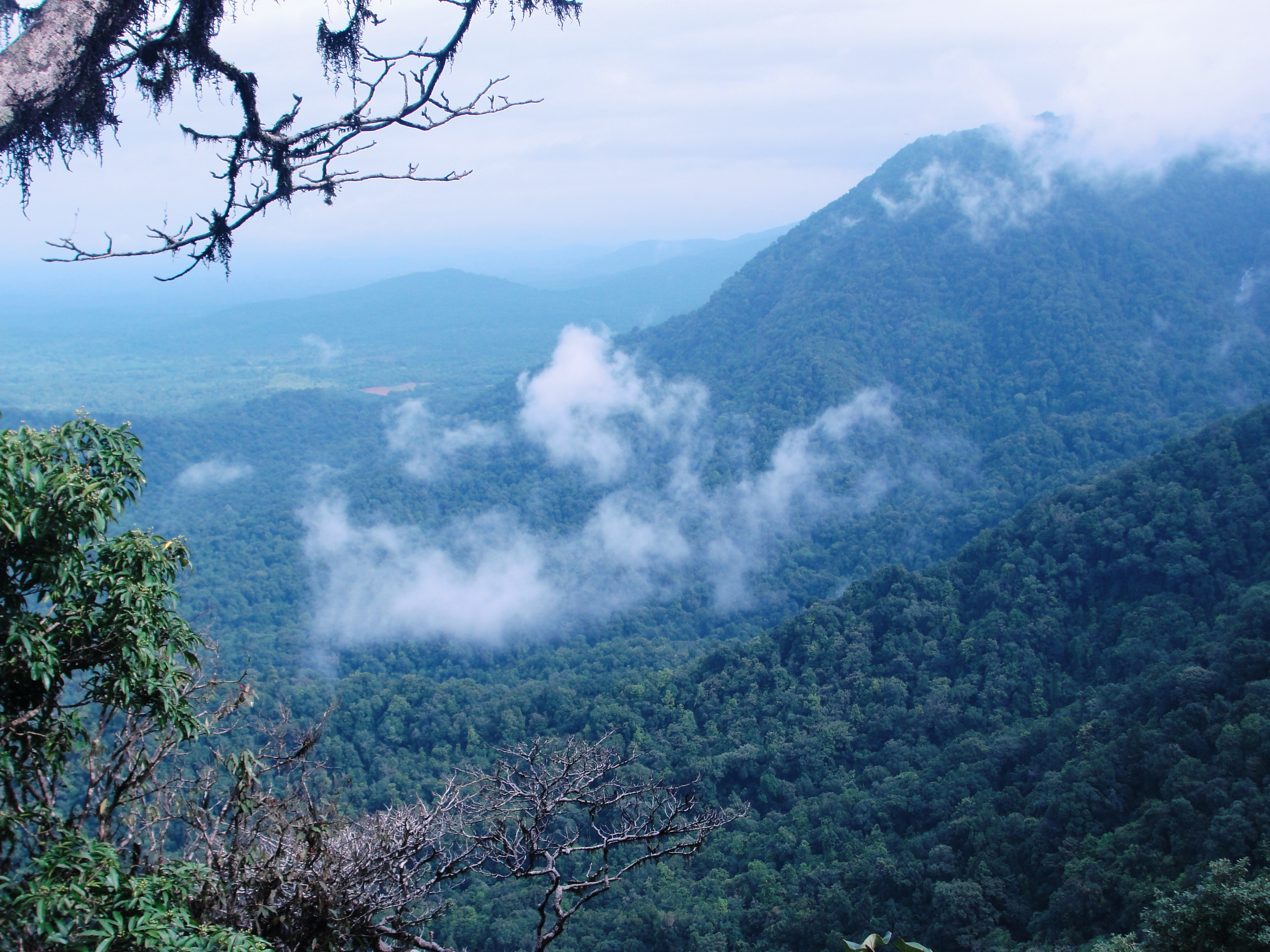
Agumbe, Sunset Point

Following is a list of peaks in the Karnataka:

| Name | Elevation | Location | District | Ref. |
|---|---|---|---|---|
| Mullayana Giri | 1,930 m (6,330 ft) | Chandra Dhrona Hill Ranges | Chikmagalur | |
| Kudremukh | 1,894 m (6,214 ft) | Kudremukh National Park | Chikmagalur | |
| Tadiandamol | 1,748 m (5,735 ft) | Brahmagiri Wildlife Sanctuary | Kodagu | |
| Kumara Parvata | 1,712 m (5,617 ft) | Pushpagiri Wildlife Sanctuary | Kodagu | |
| B R Hills | 1,707 m (5,600 ft) | Biligiriranga Hills | Chamarajanagara | |
| Merthi Gudda | 1,676 m (5,499 ft) | Basarikatte | Chikmagalur | |
| Kote betta | 1,620 m (5,310 ft) | Sirangalli | Kodagu | |
| Brahmagiri | 1,608 m (5,276 ft) | Brahmagiri Wildlife Sanctuary | Kodagu | |
| Nandi Hills | 1,478 m (4,849 ft) | Nandidurga | Chikkaballapura | |
| Gangamoola (Varaha Parvata) | 1,458 m (4,783 ft) | Kudremukh National Park | Chikmagalur | |
| Himavad Gopalaswamy Betta | 1,454 m (4,770 ft) | Bandipur National Park | Chamarajanagar | |
| Skandagiri | 1,450 m (4,760 ft) | Kalavara village | Chikkaballapura | |
| Chennagiri/Channagiri | 1,440 m (4,720 ft) | Chennagiri/Channgiri | Chikkaballapura | |
| Kodachadri | 1,343 m (4,406 ft) | Mookambika Wildlife Sanctuary | Shivamogga | |
| Savanadurga | 1,226 m (4,022 ft) | Savanadurga State Forest | Ramanagara | |
| Madhugiri Hill | 1,194 m (3,917 ft) | Madhugiri | Tumakuru | |
| Jogimatti | 1,159 m (3,802 ft) | Jogimatti Forest Reserve | Chitradurga | |
| Bilikalrangaswamybetta | 1,152 m (3,780 ft) | Bilikal Rangaswamy Reserve Forest, Kanakapura | Ramanagara district | |
| Channarayana Durga | 1,124 m (3,688 ft) | Channarayana Durga | Tumakuru | |
| Chamundi Hills | 1,000 m (3,300 ft) | Mysore | Mysore | |
| Male Mahadeshwara Hills | 915 m (3,002 ft) | Cauvery Wildlife Sanctuary | Chamarajanagar | |
| Kundadri | 826 m (2,710 ft) | Thirthahalli | Shivamogga | |
| Agumbe | 823 m (2,700 ft) | Thirthahalli | Shivamogga | |
| Makalidurga | 1,117 m (3,665 ft) | Makalidurga | Doddaballapura | |

== See also ==
- List of peaks in the Western Ghats
- List of Indian states and union territories by highest point
