= Bisle =

- village
- Interactive map of Bisle
- Country: India
- State: Karnataka
- Elevation: 840 m (2,760 ft)

Languages
  - Official: Kannada
- Time zone: UTC+5:30 (IST)
- Postal code: 573123
- Vehicle registration: KA-46

Bisle is a small village in the heart of south-western India's Western Ghats. The village is located in Hassan District's Sakleshpur (Sakaleshpura) Taluk, Karnataka.

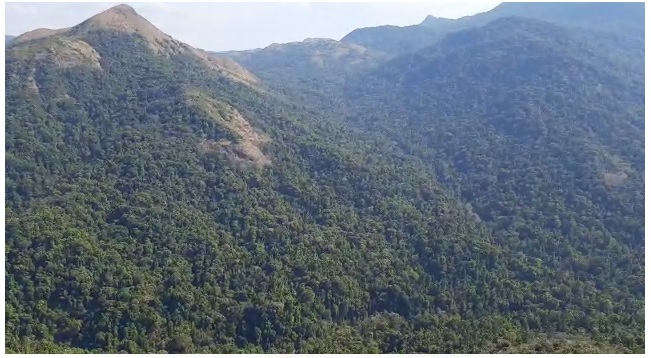
View from Bisile Ghat view point

It adjoins Bisle Reserve Forest, which has some of India's most spectacular rain forests. Near to the forest check post, a unique place called Mankanahilli lake, where the water from two different sides reaches differect direction. One towards Bay of Bengal and the other side towards Arabian Sea.

== Bisle Reserve Forest ==
Bisle Reserve Forest is a reserve forest east of Bisle village. It is contiguous with Kagneri Reserve Forest to the north, Bhagimale Reserve Forest of Dakshina Kannada district to the west, and Kukke Subramanya forest range to the southwest. To the south it merges with Pushpagiri Wildlife Sanctuary of Kodagu district.

Around 24 km from Bisle towards Kukke Subramanya there is beauty spot of Bisle called Bisle Betta or Bisle View Point. From here one can see the mountain ranges of 3 districts: Kumara Parvatha (1319 m) of Dakshina Kannada district, Pushpagiri (1712 m) and Dodda Betta (1119 m) of Kodagu district and Patta Betta (1112 m) and Enni Kallu (900 m) of Hassan district. The highlight of this point is that the view has a valley, with Giri River separating the beauty point and these mountain ranges. The forest department has erected a shelter here to sit and enjoy the view.

Though Bisle is given the status of reserve forest, the stretch from Kulkunda to Bisle gate is undisturbed by human activities except for the following constructions by forest department.

- A check post & related residential hutments at Budi Choudi.
- Three km ahead of Budi Choudi, a reception room on the roadside.
- Down on the riverside of Addahole few Dormitories with a rope bridge.
- An inspection bungalow at Addahole bridge.
- A round sun shade at a view point and watch tower at the Bisle View Point.

The reserve forest is part of the North Western Ghats montane rain forests ecoregion.

The thick forest is home of king cobras, tigers (rarely seen), Sambar deer, peacocks, numerous species of birds, Spotted deer, brown fox and Mahasheer fish, not to mention a number of flora and fauna which can only be found in this region of Western Ghats. Elephants often criss cross this area and is an elephant corridor of Western ghats. One of the largest and rarest Indian mustelids Nilgiri marten (Martes gwatkinsii) were sighted recently in Bisle forest.
