= North Western Ghats moist deciduous forests =

Ecoregion in India

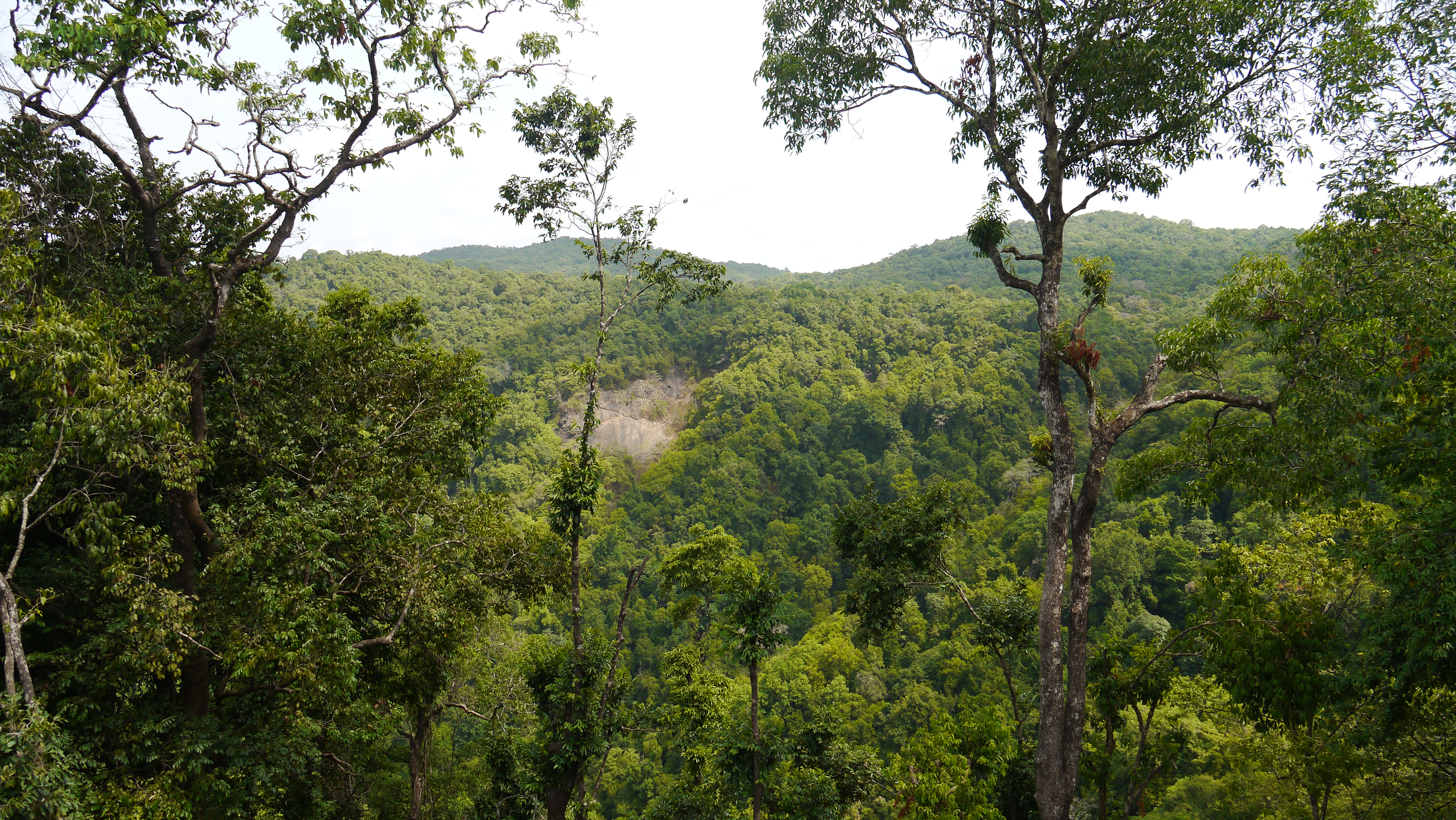
- Anshi National Park, Karnataka

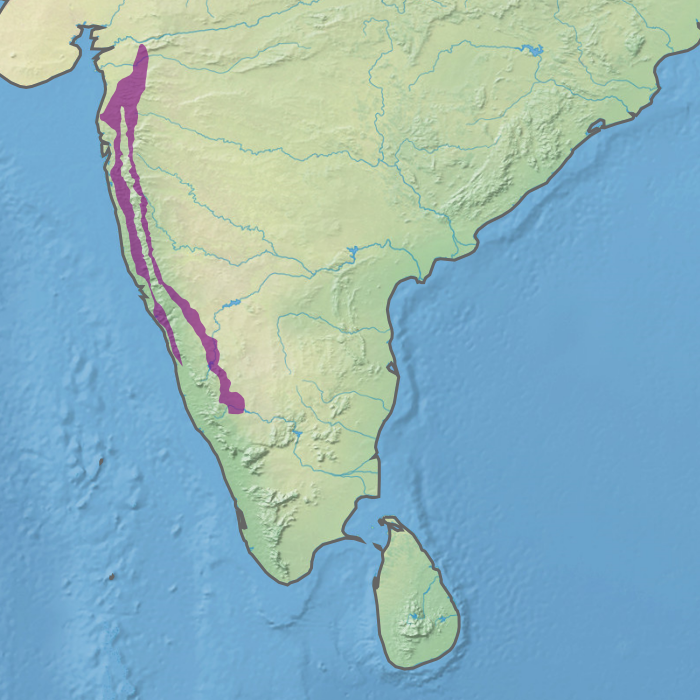
- Ecoregion territory (in purple)

Ecology
- Realm: Indomalayan
- Biome: tropical and subtropical moist broadleaf forests
- Borders: List: Deccan thorn scrub forests; Khathiar-Gir dry deciduous forests; Malabar Coast moist forests; Narmada Valley dry deciduous forests; North Western Ghats montane rain forests; South Deccan Plateau dry deciduous forests; South Western Ghats moist deciduous forests; South Western Ghats montane rain forests

Geography
- Area: 48,040 km^{2} (18,550 sq mi)
- Country: India
- States and union territory: Dadra and Nagar Haveli; Goa; Gujarat; Karnataka; Maharashtra

Conservation
- Conservation status: critical/endangered
- Protected: 2,375 km^{2} (5%)

The North Western Ghats moist deciduous forests is a tropical moist broadleaf forest ecoregion of southwestern India.

== Geography ==
The North Western Ghats moist deciduous forests lies in the northern portion of the Western Ghats (Sahyadri) range. It extends from southeastern Gujarat through Dadra and Nagar Haveli, Maharashtra, Goa, and Karnataka. It covers the eastern and western slopes of the range between 250 and 1000 meters elevation, and surrounds the North Western Ghats montane rain forests ecoregion, which lies above 1000 meters elevation. The ecoregion has an area of 48,200 square kilometers (18,600 sq mi). It is bounded on the west by the Malabar Coast moist forests ecoregion, which lies between the 250 meter elevation and the Arabian Sea. At its northern end, the ecoregion extends to the Narmada River, and borders the Khathiar-Gir dry deciduous forests to the northwest and the Narmada Valley dry deciduous forests to the northeast. The Wayanad forests at the southern end of the ecoregion mark the transition to the South Western Ghats moist deciduous forests further the south.

To the east, in the dry rain shadow of the Ghats, are the Deccan thorn scrub forests and the South Deccan Plateau dry deciduous forests ecoregions, which cover the Ghats' eastern foothills and the Deccan Plateau.

== Protected areas ==
A 2017 assessment found that 2,375 km^{2}, or 5%, of the ecoregion was in protected areas. Another 15% is forested but outside protected areas. A 1997 assessment identified thirteen protected areas in the ecoregion, with a combined area of approximately 2,200 km².

- Anshi National Park, Karnataka (280 km²; also extends into the North Western Ghats montane rain forests)
- Bhadra Wildlife Sanctuary, Karnataka (330 km², also extends into the North Western Ghats montane rain forests)
- Bhimashankar Wildlife Sanctuary, Maharashtra (30km², also extends into the Narmada Valley dry deciduous forests)
- Chandoli National Park, Maharashtra (100 km², also extends into the North Western Ghats montane rain forests)
- Cotigao Wildlife Sanctuary, Goa (170km²)
- Karnala Bird Sanctuary, Maharashtra (50km²)
- Koyna Wildlife Sanctuary, Maharashtra (90 km², also extends into the North Western Ghats montane rain forests)
- Mookambika Wildlife Sanctuary, Karnataka (140 km², also extends into the North Western Ghats montane rain forests)
- Shoolpaneshwar Wildlife Sanctuary, Gujarat (330 km²)
- Purna Wildlife Sanctuary, Gujarat (150 km²)
- Sharavati Valley Wildlife Sanctuary, Karnataka (220 km², also extends into the North Western Ghats montane rain forests)
- Shettihalli Wildlife Sanctuary, Karnataka (280 km², also extends into the North Western Ghats montane rain forests)
- Tansa Wildlife Sanctuary, Maharashtra (80 km², also extends into the North Western Ghats montane rain forests)

== See also ==
- List of ecoregions in India
- Arid Forest Research Institute (AFRI)
