= Jogimatti Wildlife Sanctuary =

Wildlife Sanctuary in India

Coordinates: 14°09′45″N 76°23′51″E

- IUCN category IV (habitat/species management area)
- Interactive map of Jogimatti Wildlife Sanctuary
- Location: Chitradurga district, Karnataka, India
- Area: 100.48 km^{2} (38.80 sq mi)
- Established: 23 December 2015

Jogimatti Wildlife Sanctuary is located in the Chitradurga district of Karnataka. The wooded region of Jogimatti is a hill station and is rich in biodiversity. The area is picturesque, and is relatively compact with a wide range of flora and fauna. It is notified through an official notification on 23 December 2015. Jogimatti Sanctuary covers an area of 100.48 km^{2} of grasslands and shrub forests, approximately. In the hilly forests of Jogimatti jackals, wolves, sloth bears and leopards roam amidst windmills.

The Jogimatti forests are home to one of the few wild surviving endangered leopards. In the hilly forests of Jogimatti, Indian jackals, wolves, sloth bears, porcupines, and jungle cats roam amidst windmills. With its contiguous single-block intersperse of hillocks and plains, the Jogimatti forest is known as ‘Ooty of Dryland’.

== Background ==
There is a long-standing demand to clearing the proposal of declaring Kappathagudda as a conservation reserve and the state government, after persistent calls from the activists, notified this ecologically sensitive region as a Wildlife Sanctuary. The hillocks are referred to as Western Ghats of north Karnataka region.

== Mining ==
Activists claim that the government has, for long, did not act against illegal mining activities around the Jogimatti wildlife sanctuary. This has posed a serious threat to wildlife, flora and human habitats. A proposal to declare it as eco-sensitive zone (ESZ) is pending from 2019.
