= Malabar Coast moist forests =

Ecoregion in India

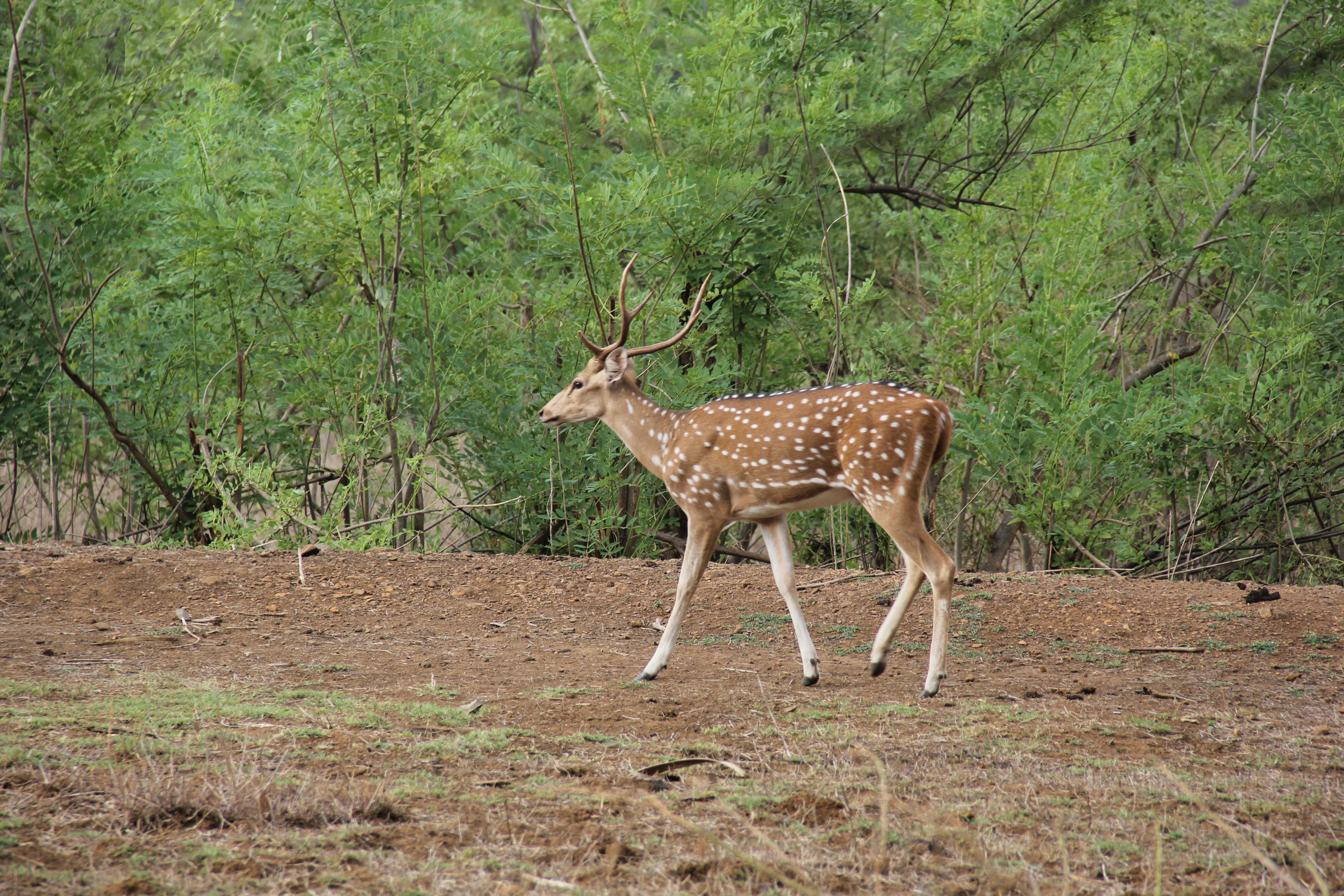
- Chital (Axis axis) in Sanjay Gandhi National Park

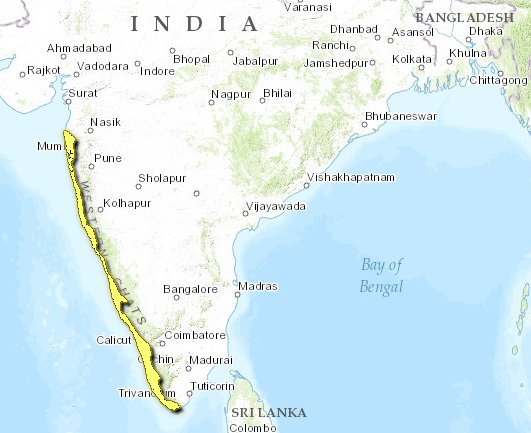
- Map of the Malabar Coast moist forests ecoregion

Ecology
- Realm: Indomalayan
- Biome: tropical and subtropical moist broadleaf forests
- Borders: List: Deccan thorn scrub forests; North Western Ghats moist deciduous forests; North Western Ghats montane rain forests; South Western Ghats moist deciduous forests; South Western Ghats montane rain forests

Geography
- Area: 34,219 km^{2} (13,212 sq mi)
- Country: India
- States: Goa; Karnataka; Kerala; Maharashtra; Tamil Nadu

Conservation
- Conservation status: critical/endangered
- Protected: 1,251 km² (4%)

The Malabar Coast moist forests are a tropical moist broadleaf forest ecoregion of southwestern India.

== Geography ==
The ecoregion lies along India's Konkan and Malabar coasts, in a narrow strip between the Arabian Sea and the Western Ghats range, which runs parallel to the coast. It has an area of 35,500 square kilometers (13,700 sq mi), and extends from northern Maharashtra through Goa, Karnataka and Kerala to Kanniyakumari in southernmost Tamil Nadu.

The ecoregion extends from sea level to the 250 meter contour of the Western Ghats. It is bounded on the east by the North Western Ghats moist deciduous forests in Maharashtra and Karnataka, and the South Western Ghats moist deciduous forests in Kerala.

Much of the ecoregion is densely populated, and it includes several large cities, including Mumbai in Maharashtra, Mormugao and Margao in Goa, Mangalore in Karnataka, and Thiruvananthapuram, Kochi, and Kozhikode in Kerala.

== Climate ==
The climate is tropical and humid. Rainfall varies seasonally, falling mostly with the southwest monsoon between June and September. Rainfall is generally higher in the south, decreasing and becoming more seasonal as one moves north.

== Flora ==
The original vegetation in the ecoregion was tropical evergreen rainforest, with some deciduous trees particularly in drier areas. The original forests have mostly been replaced with or interspersed with teak (Tectona grandis), a mostly deciduous tree that drops its leaves during the winter dry season.

Characteristic canopy trees include Tetrameles nudiflora, Stereospermum personatum, Dysoxylum binectariferum, Ficus nervosa, Ficus glomerata, Pterocarpus marsupium, Salmalia malabarica, Terminalia bellerica, Terminalia tomentosa, Anogeissus latifolia, Dalbergia latifolia, Lannea coromandelica, Madhuca indica, Garuga pinnata, Syzygium cumini, Olea dioica, Pouteria tomentosa, Bridelia retusa, Mangifera spp., and Actinodaphne angustifolia. There is an understorey of low trees (Erythrina variegata, Butea monosperma, Wrightia tinctoria, Bauhinia racemosa, and Zizyphus rugosa) and shrubs (Flacourtia spp., Woodfordia fruticosa, Meyna laxiflora, and Carissa congesta).

In drier areas along Karnataka's northern coast, the deciduous trees Lagerstroemia microcarpa, teak (Tectona grandis), and Dillenia pentagyna are predominant.

Swamp forests of Myristica spp. are found in low-lying coastal areas, but are now endangered. The Kerala Backwaters are an extensive coastal lagoon system in the southern portion of the ecoregion.

== Fauna ==
There are 97 native mammal species in the ecoregion. The ecoregion's remaining habitat is too limited and fragmented to support viable populations of most larger mammals, including Asian elephant (Elephas maximus), tiger (Panthera tigris) sloth bear (Melursus ursinus), gaur (Bos gaurus), and dhole (Cuon alpinus). Wild tigers and Asian elephants are locally extinct, but still found in adjacent portions of the Western Ghats. The other large mammals are locally threatened.

Several smaller mammals are threatened by habitat loss, including the gray slender loris (Loris lydekkerianus), Jerdon's palm civet (Paradoxurus jerdoni), and grizzled giant squirrel (Ratufa macroura).

The ecoregion has one strictly endemic species, the Kerala rat (Rattus ranjiniae). Day's shrew (Suncus dayi) is found in both the Malabar Coast forests and the adjacent South Western Ghats moist deciduous forests. The Nilgiri langur (Semnopithecus johnii), Jerdon's civet, and the Malabar large-spotted civet (Viverra civettina) also inhabit the South Western Ghats moist deciduous forests and South Western Ghats montane forests. The Travancore flying squirrel (Petinomys fuscocapillus) is found in the ecoregion and on Sri Lanka.

There are 280 native species of birds, including the Malabar grey hornbill (Ocyceros griseus), Indian grey hornbill (Ocyceros birostris), great hornbill (Buceros bicornis), lesser florican (Sypheotides indicus), and greater flamingo (Phoenicopterus roseus).

== Conservation and threats ==
Very little of the natural vegetation of the ecoregion remains; it has largely been cleared for agriculture, grazing, and teak plantations.

== Protected areas ==
A 2017 assessment found that 1,251 km², or 4%, of the ecoregion is in protected areas. Protected areas include:

- Sanjay Gandhi National Park, Maharashtra (50 km²)
- Bhagwan Mahaveer Sanctuary and Mollem National Park, Goa (150 km²)
- Peechi-Vazhani Wildlife Sanctuary, Kerala (100 km²)
- Phansad Wildlife Sanctuary, Maharashtra
- Kumarakom Bird Sanctuary, Kerala
- Idamalayar Reserve Forest (partly in the South Western Ghats moist deciduous forests and the South Western Ghats montane rain forests)

== See also ==
- List of ecoregions in India
- South Western Ghats moist deciduous forests
- South Western Ghats montane rain forests
- Malabar rainforests
