= South Western Ghats moist deciduous forests =

Ecoregion in India

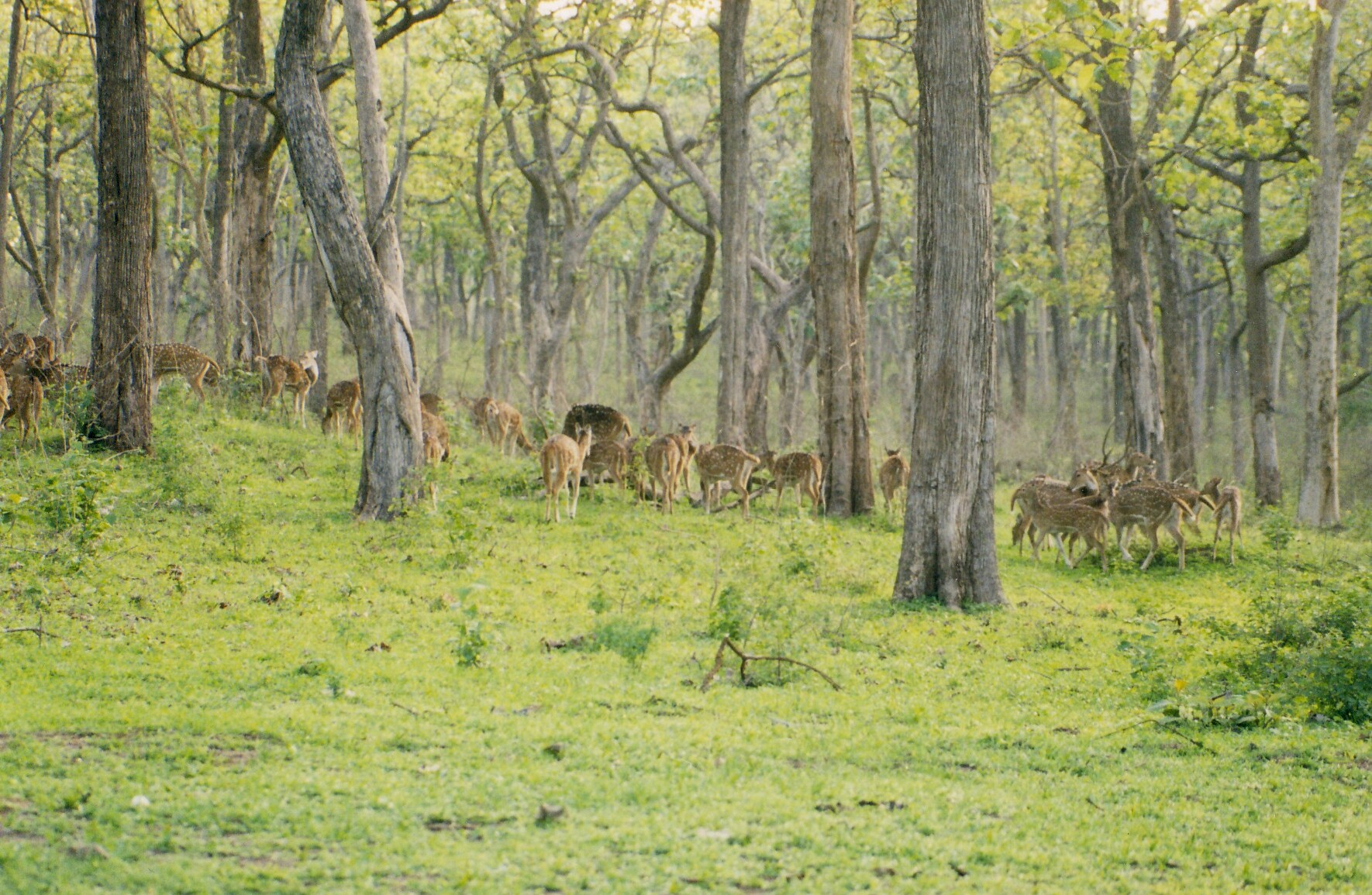
- Chitals in Bandipur National Park, Karnataka

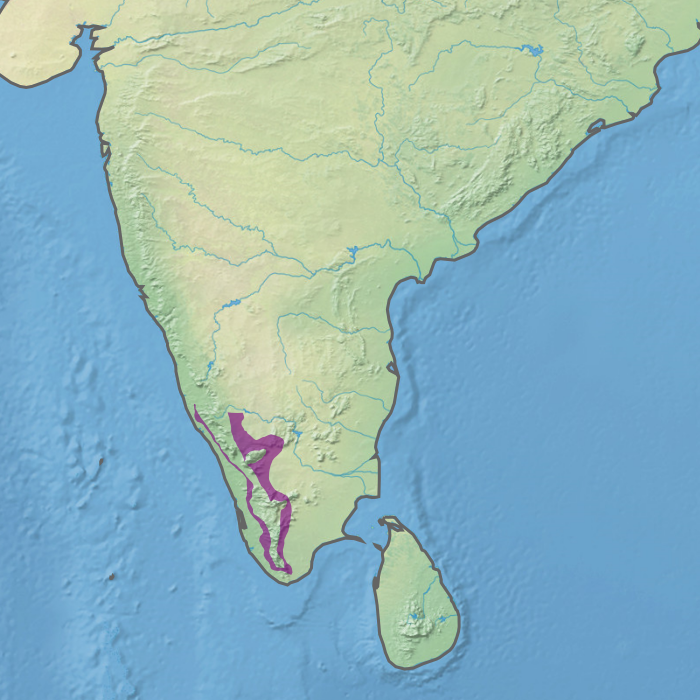
- Ecoregion territory (in purple)

Ecology
- Realm: Indomalayan
- Biome: tropical and subtropical moist broadleaf forests
- Borders: List: Deccan thorn scrub forests; Malabar Coast moist forests; North Western Ghats moist deciduous forests; North Western Ghats montane rain forests; South Deccan Plateau dry deciduous forests; South Western Ghats montane rain forests

Geography
- Area: 23,676 km^{2} (9,141 mi^{2})
- Country: India
- States: Karnataka; Kerala; Tamil Nadu
- Coordinates: 10.125225°N 77.035049°E

Conservation
- Conservation status: critical/endangered
- Protected: 6,645 km² (28%)

The South Western Ghats moist deciduous forests is an ecoregion in the Western Ghats of southern India with tropical and subtropical moist broadleaf forests. This biome covers the Nilgiri Hills between elevation of 250 and 1,000 m (820 and 3,280 ft) in Kerala, Karnataka and Tamil Nadu states.

== Geography ==
The ecoregion has an area of 23,800 square kilometers (9,200 sq mi). It includes the southern ranges of the Western Ghats, including the Agastyamalai and Anamalai, and the eastward spurs or slopes of the Nilgiri Hills and Palani Hills. The forests of Wayanad in northern Kerala mark the transition to the North Western Ghats moist deciduous forests to the north. To the west, the Malabar Coast moist forests ecoregion lies in the coastal strip between the 250 meter contour and the Malabar Coast. To the east, the ecoregion transitions to the South Deccan Plateau dry deciduous forests ecoregion in the drier rain shadow of the Western Ghats. It surrounds the South Western Ghats montane rain forests ecoregion, which lies above 1000 meters elevation.

== Climate ==
The climate of the ecoregion is tropical, and varies with elevation and exposure.

The western slopes of the mountains intercept moisture-bearing winds during the June to September southwest monsoon, when 65% to 80% of the annual rainfall occurs. The northeast monsoon brings additional rain between October and November. Evapotranspiration from the forests and moist sea air from the Arabian Sea provide additional humidity. December to May are the driest months. Rainfall on the west side of the range averages 2,000–3,000 mm annually. The eastern slopes are on the rain shadow of the mountains, and rainfall averages 1000 to 2000 mm annually.

Average temperatures are generally cooler than in the adjacent lowlands, and decrease with increasing elevation.

== Flora ==
Many forest trees lose their leaves during the dry season. Typical tree species include Adina cordifolia, Albizia odoratissima, Albizia procera, Alstonia scholaris, Bombax ceiba, Toona ciliata, Dalbergia latifolia, Grewia tiliaefolia, Holoptelea integrifolia, Hymenodictyon excelsum, Lagerstroemia lanceolata, Lagerstroemia speciosa, Lannea coromandelica, Miliusa velutina, Pterocarpus marsupium, Schleichera oleosa, Spondias pinnata, Radermachera xylocarpa, Tectona grandis, Terminalia bellerica, Terminalia paniculata, Terminalia tomentosa, Vitex altissima, Xylia xylocarpa, and Machilus macrantha.

== Fauna ==
There are 89 native mammal species in the ecoregion. Larger mammals include the tiger (Panthera tigris), Asian elephant (Elephas elephas), gaur (Bos gaurus), Nilgiri langur (Semnopithecus johnii), dhole or Asian wild dog (Cuon alpinus), and sloth bear (Melursus ursinus). Among the smaller mammals are several threatened species, including Jerdon's palm civet (Paradoxurus jerdoni), Gray slender loris (Loris lydekkerianus), grizzled giant squirrel (Ratufa macroura), and Indian giant squirrel (Ratufa indica). There are no strictly endemic mammals. The ranges of the Nilgiri langur, Jerdon's civet, and Malabar large-spotted civet (Viverra civettina) extend upwards into the montane rain forests and downwards into the Malabar coastal forests. Day's shrew (Suncus dayi) is also found in the coastal forests, and Layard's striped squirrel (Funambulus layardi) extends into the montane rain forests.

The ecoregion has 322 native species of birds. There are nine near-endemic species, which are also found in the adjacent montane rain forests: the Nilgiri wood pigeon (Columba elphinstonii), Malabar grey hornbill (Ocyceros griseus), grey-headed bulbul (Brachypodius priocephalus), rufous babbler (Argya subrufa), white-bellied treepie (Dendrocitta leucogastra), black-and-rufous flycatcher (Ficedula nigrorufa), Nilgiri flycatcher (Eumyias albicaudata), yellow-throated bulbul (Pycnonotus xantholaemus), and Malabar parakeet (Psittacula columboides).

== Protected areas ==
A 2017 assessment found that 6,645 km², or 28%, of the ecoregion was in protected areas. Another 50% is forested but outside protected areas. In 1997, the World Wildlife Fund identified fourteen protected areas in the ecoregion, with a combined area of approximately 4,960 km², that encompassed 21% of the ecoregion's area. The adjacent protected areas of Bandipur, Nagarhole, Mudumalai, and Wyanad are home to India's largest protected population of elephants, with over 2500 individuals.

- Bandipur National Park, Karnataka (1,110 km²)
- Bilgiriranga Swamy Temple Wildlife Sanctuary, Karnataka (370 km², partly in the South Deccan Plateau dry deciduous forests)
- Chinnar Wildlife Sanctuary, Kerala (50 km²)
- Eravikulam National Park, Kerala (90 km², partly in the South Western Ghats montane rain forests)
- Indira Gandhi National Park (Anamalai), Tamil Nadu (620 km² partly in the South Western Ghats montane rain forests)
- Kalakkad Mundanthurai Tiger Reserve, Tamil Nadu (895 km², partly in the South Western Ghats montane rain forests)
- Megamalai Wildlife Sanctuary, Tamil Nadu (310 km², partly in the South Western Ghats montane rain forests)
- Mudumalai National Park, Tamil Nadu 400 km²)
- Nagarhole National Park, Karnataka (620 km²)
- Neyyar Wildlife Sanctuary, Kerala (128 km²)
- Parambikulam Wildlife Sanctuary, Kerala (285 km²)
- Periyar National Park, Kerala (470 km², partly in the South Western Ghats montane rain forests)
- Peppara Wildlife Sanctuary, Kerala (40 km² partly in the South Western Ghats montane rain forests)
- Wayanad Wildlife Sanctuary, Kerala (430 km²)

In 2000 a portion of The Nilgiris was designated a biosphere reserve under UNESCO's Man and the Biosphere Programme. In 2012 a World Heritage Site was designated in the Western Ghats, covering seven groups of protected areas in the range. Four of those areas - Agasthyamalai, Periyar, Anamalai, and Nilgiri – extend through the ecoregion.
