= Jogimatti =

Coordinates: 14.16242°N 76.39778°E

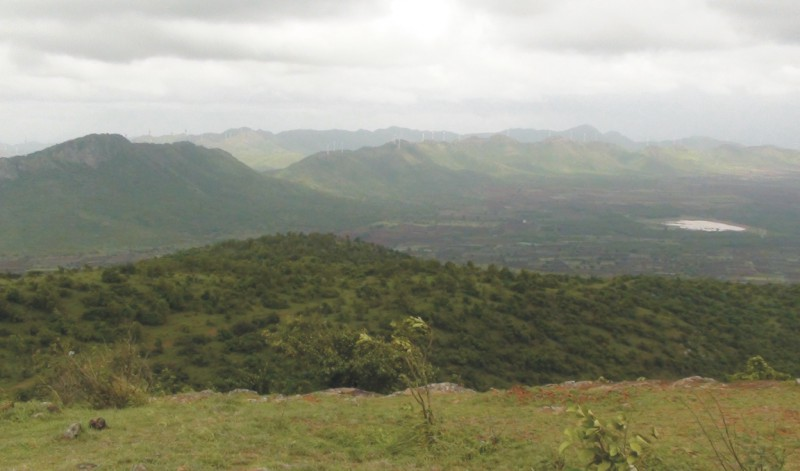
Jogimatti reserve

Jogimatti is a hill station and forest reserve in Chitradurga district, Karnataka, India. The reserve covers 10,048.97 hectares (38.7993 sq mi) in Chitradurga, Holalkere and Hiriyur taluks, 10 kilometres (6.2 mi) south of the city of Chitradurga. There is a century-old hilltop bungalow built by the British to house travellers, and a nearby temple dedicated to the local saint for whom the hill station was named, with 155 steps. The reserve has a small zoo called Adumalleshwar, which the Central Zoo Authority of India ordered renovated in 2012 to better house the animals, and an ecotourism adventure centre which opened in 2010. A waterfall called Himavatkedara or Himavatkedra has created a natural cave in which a Shiva lingam and idols of Veerabhadra and Basavanna have been placed.

Jogimatti is the highest point in the district, at 3,803 feet (1,159 m) in elevation, and one of the coolest places in the state. The vegetation is dry deciduous forest and scrub. It is rich in wildlife and until the 1950s was tiger habitat, but is threatened by encroachment from farms and from nearby windmills, which endanger birds. The tigers and sloth bears are reported to have almost died out, and the medicinal plants found in the reserve are endangered. A proposal has been made to declare it a wildlife refuge. Jogimatti was declared as sanctuary in 2018.

== See also ==
- Jogimatti Wildlife Sanctuary
