= Sanjay Gubbi =

Indian conservation biologist

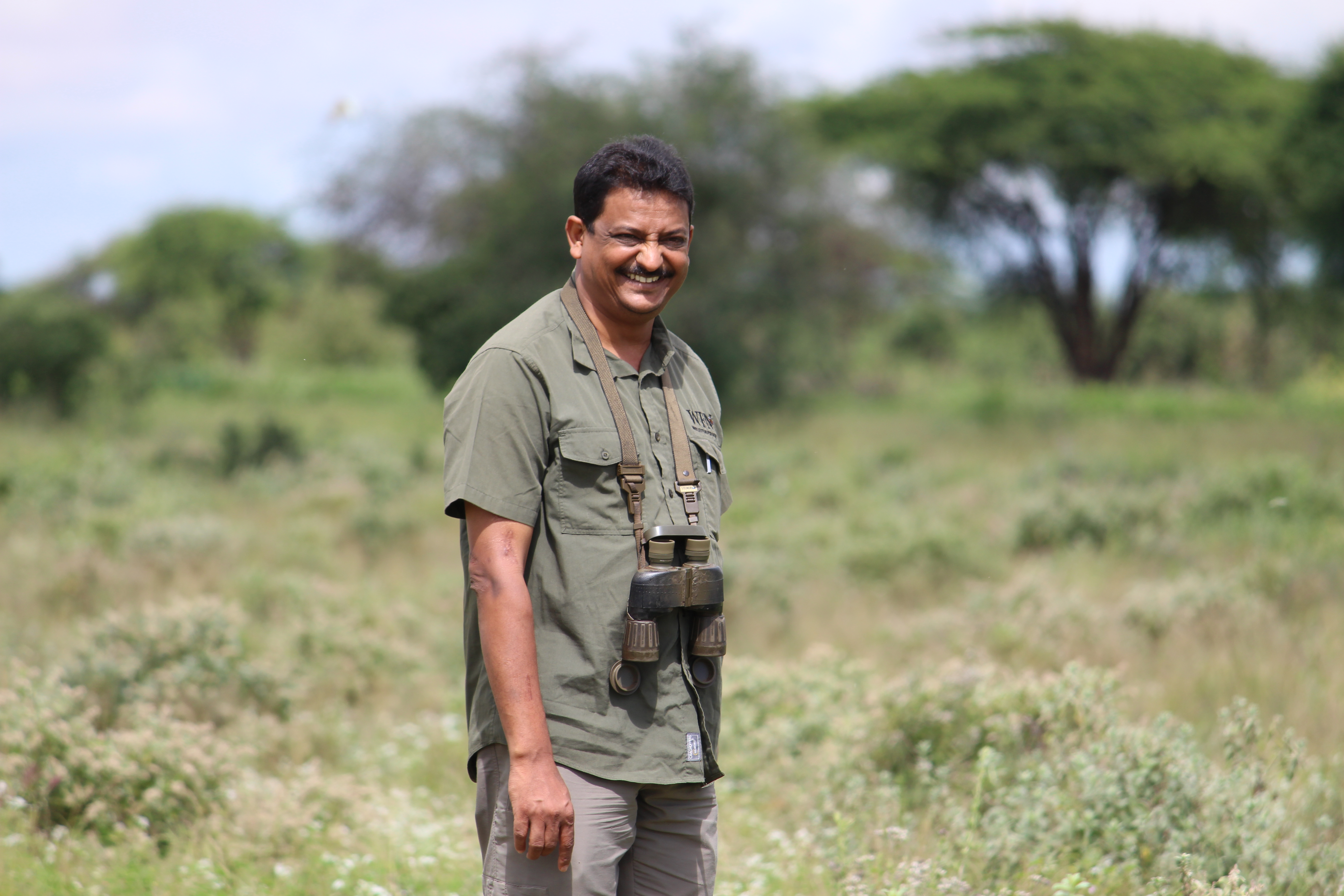

Sanjay Gubbi (born February 4, 1971) is an Indian conservation biologist based in Karnataka, India. His work focuses on the conservation of large carnivores like tigers and leopards, understanding their population biology, proposing conservation policy, and minimizing human-wildlife conflict. He is a programme head at the Holématthi Nature Foundation.

== Personal life and education ==
Gubbi was born to Navarathna and Sreyamsha Kumar N.B. in Pavagada, Tumkur district, Karnataka on February 4, 1971. Tumkur district is covered in dry scrub forests and is home to animals such as leopards, sloth bears, wolves, blackbucks, and chinkara, which inspired Gubbi's interest in wildlife conservation at a young age.

In 2006, he completed a Master’s degree in Conservation Biology from the Durrell Institute of Conservation and Ecology, University of Kent, where he received the Maurice Swingland Prize.

Gubbi completed his PhD in Leopard Ecology and Conservation in 2020 from Kuvempu University, Karnataka.

== Career ==
Gubbi volunteered in wildlife conservation for nearly a decade before entering the field professionally in 1998. He initially worked with the Wildlife Conservation Society India Program and later served with the Nature Conservation Foundation until 2011. He now leads a team working on large carnivore science, community-based conservation, and human-wildlife conflict at the Holématthi Nature Foundation. He has also served as a member of the Karnataka State Wildlife Board and other state wildlife panels.

Gubbi has taught courses at the National Centre for Biological Sciences, the Wildlife Institute of India, and Kuvempu University. His research focuses on leopards, including population estimation, occupancy surveys, diet studies, and human-leopard conflict. He also works on mitigating highway impacts on wildlife, conserving forest corridors, providing firewood alternatives to forest-dwelling communities, and conducting community outreach.

Gubbi worked with the government to delineate eco-sensitive zones around protected areas and tiger reserves in Karnataka. Bandipur was the first tiger reserve in India to receive final notification of an eco-sensitive zone. He also contributed to reducing habitat fragmentation from mining in Kudremukh National Park and infrastructure projects in the Western Ghats.

His efforts led to the establishment of the Holematthi Nature Information Center near Hanur, Kollegal district, which conducts wildlife awareness programs for local students. Based on his proposals, several new protected areas were notified, including Malai Mahadeshwara Wildlife Sanctuary (906 km²), Bukkapatna Chinkara Wildlife Sanctuary (148 km²), and Rangayyanadurga Wildlife Sanctuary (77 km²). His conservation initiatives have helped add nearly 3,000 km² of forested land to Karnataka's protected area network, connecting 23 protected areas and corridors in the Western Ghats.

== Publications ==
Gubbi has authored and co-authored numerous scientific papers and books in English and Kannada. His notable English titles include Second Nature: Saving Tiger Landscapes in the Twenty-First Century, Leopard Diaries: The Rosette in India, and The Last Pathways: Wildlife Corridors of Karnataka.

=== Books ===
- Kaadinolagondu Maneya Maadi (2026), Ankita Prakashana (in Kannada).
- Kaadina Geleyara Kaaduva Kathegalu (2026), Ankita Prakashana (in Kannada).
- Leopard Diaries: The Rosette in India (2021), Westland Publications.
- Land of the Honey Badger (2020) (co-authored with H. C. Poornesha), Nature Conservation Foundation.
- Second Nature: Saving Tiger Landscapes in the Twenty-First Century (2018), Rain Fed Books.
- Shaalege Banda Chirate Mattu Itara Kathegalu (The leopard that came to the school and other stories), Navakarnataka Publishers (in Kannada).
- Vanyajeevigala Jaadu Hididu (On the trail of wildlife), Navakarnataka Publishers (in Kannada).
- Vanyajeevigala Ramya Loka (The Delightful World of Wildlife) [Co-editor], Navakarnataka Publishers (in Kannada).
- The Last Pathways: Wildlife Corridors of Karnataka (2026), Holistic Wildlife Services.

== Awards ==
- **Carl Zeiss Wildlife Conservation Award** (2011)
- Named among "25 Leaders of Tomorrow" by The Times of India (2012)
- **Whitley Award** ("Green Oscars") for landscape-scale conservation (2017)
- **Co-Existence Award** by Elephant Family, UK (2019)

== Selected research articles ==
- Gubbi, S., Ghoshal, A., Prabhu, K., & Rexstad, E. Prey matters: Estimating prey abundance in a large carnivore recovery site in southern India. Oryx.
- Gubbi, S., Prabhu, K., & Suthar, S. (2025). First-ever documentation of a leopard preying on flying fox: Are leopards secondary dispersers? Cat News, 82, 24–25.
- Gubbi, S., Prabhu, K., Komarla, J., & Suthar, S. (2024). Rediscovering dholes in the Deccan Plateau, southern India. Canid Biology & Conservation, 27(6), 34–38.
- Kolekar, A., Hockings, K., Metcalfe, K., & Gubbi, S. (2024). Identifying priority areas for the Indian leopard (Panthera pardus fusca) within a shared landscape. Ecology & Evolution, 14(10).
- Pattekar, S., Gubbi, S., Struebig, M. J., & Benson, J. F. (2024). Response of dholes to prey availability and human disturbance in space and time in southern India. Biological Conservation, 297.
- Gubbi, S., Menon, A., Suthar, S., Prabhu, K., & Poornesha, H. C. (2023). Home range estimate of sloth bear using non-invasive camera-trap data. Ursus, 34e7, 1–6.
- Gubbi, S., Prabhu, K., Suthar, S., Poornesha, H. C., & Deschamps, J. (2023). Quantifying the threat of wire snares using camera trapping data in India. Biological Conservation, 286.
- Gubbi, S. (2022). Many facets of afforestation (tree planting) and climate change. Current Science, 122(9), 1007–1008.
- Gubbi, S., Kolekar, A., & Kumara, V. (2021). Quantifying Wire Snares as a Threat to Leopards in Karnataka, India. Tropical Conservation Science, 14.
- Gubbi, S., Sharma, K., & Kumara, V. (2020). Every hill has its leopard: Patterns of space use by leopards (Panthera pardus) in a mixed use landscape in India. PeerJ, 8:e10072.
