= South Deccan Plateau dry deciduous forests =

Ecoregion in India

Coordinates: 12.0000°N 77.5000°E

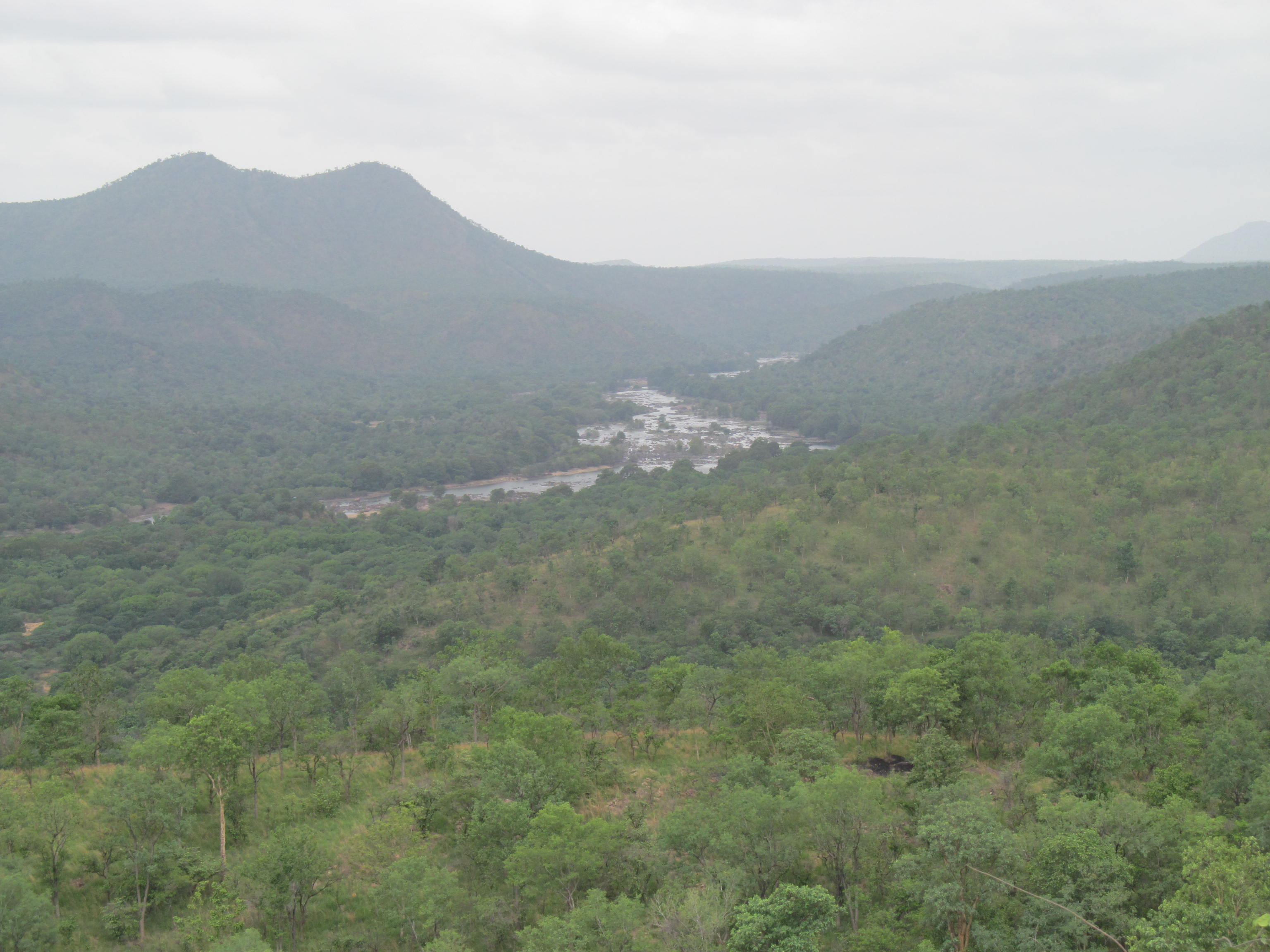
- Cauvery Wildlife Sanctuary

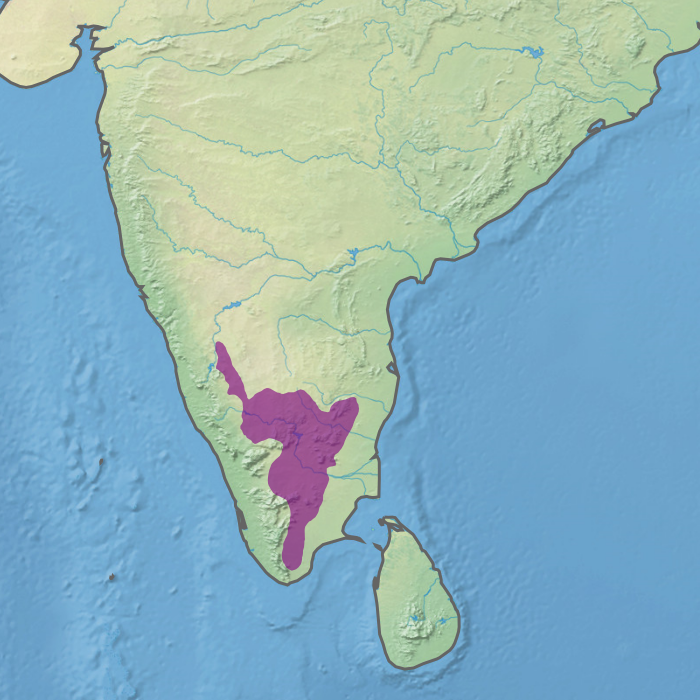
- Ecoregion territory (in purple)

Ecology
- Realm: Indomalayan
- Biome: tropical and subtropical dry broadleaf forests
- Borders: Deccan thorn scrub forests; South Western Ghats moist deciduous forests

Geography
- Area: 81,925 km^{2} (31,631 mi^{2})
- Country: India
- States: Karnataka; Tamil Nadu

Conservation
- Conservation status: critical/endangered
- Protected: 7,597 km^{2} (9%)

The South Deccan Plateau dry deciduous forests is a tropical dry forest ecoregion in southern India. The ecoregion lies in the southernmost portion of the Deccan Plateau, and includes the southernmost portion of the Eastern Ghats.

The ecoregion lies in the rain shadow of the Western Ghats, and receives most of its rainfall with the June–September southwest monsoon. It is characterized by tall trees that drop their leaves during the dry winter and spring months. Much of the forest has been degraded through over-use, and thorn forests and shrub thickets are common. To the north and east, the dry deciduous forests transition to the drier Deccan thorn scrub forests.

== Flora ==
These forests have three stories, with an upper canopy at 15–25 m (49–82 ft), an understory at 10–15 m (33–49 ft), and undergrowth at 3–5 m (9.8–16.4 ft). Trees are draped in lianas in denser, mature forests. The vegetation is characterized by Albizia amara, Anogeissus latifolia, Boswellia serrata, Cassia fistula, Chloroxylon swietenia, Dalbergia latifolia, Diospyros montana, Hardwickia binata, Pterocarpus marsupium, Senegalia catechu, Anthoshorea roxburghii, Stereospermum colais, Terminalia bellirica, Terminalia paniculata, and Terminalia elliptica. Sal found here is used for railway sleepers and house construction while teak, a durable timber, is used for ship building and furniture. Sandalwood (Santalum album) is used for perfume and semal for toys.

== Fauna ==
The ecoregion is home to 75 mammal species. Threatened species include the Indian elephant (Elephas maximus), wild dog (Cuon alpinus), sloth bear (Melursus ursinus), chousingha (Tetracerus quadricornis), gaur (Bos gaurus), and grizzled giant squirrel (Ratufa macruora). Salim Ali's fruit bat (Latidens salimalii) is critically endangered, and is near-endemic. 260 species of birds live in the eco-region,such as the rufous babbler (Turdoides subrufus) and yellow-throated bulbul (Pycnonotus xantholaemus). The threatened great Indian bustard (Ardeotis nigriceps) and lesser florican (Eupodotis indica) inhabit the eco-region.

== Protected areas ==
- Bannerghatta National Park, Karnataka 140 square kilometres (54 sq mi)
- Biligiriranga Swamy Temple Wildlife Sanctuary, Karnataka 290 square kilometres (110 sq mi)
- Cauvery Wildlife Sanctuary, Karnataka 500 square kilometres (190 sq mi)
- Melkote Temple Wildlife Sanctuary, Karnataka 50 square kilometres (19 sq mi)
- Ranganthittu Bird Sanctuary, Karnataka 20 square kilometres (7.7 sq mi)
- Sathyamangalam Wildlife Sanctuary, Tamil Nadu 1,411.6 square kilometres (545.0 sq mi)
- Vedanthangal Bird Sanctuary, Tamil Nadu 70 square kilometres (27 sq mi)
- Cauvery North Wildlife Sanctuary, Tamil Nadu

== See also ==
- Bayalu Seeme
- List of ecoregions in India
