= Kudremukh National Park =

National park in Karnataka, India

Coordinates: 13.25°N 75.2°W

- IUCN category II (national park)
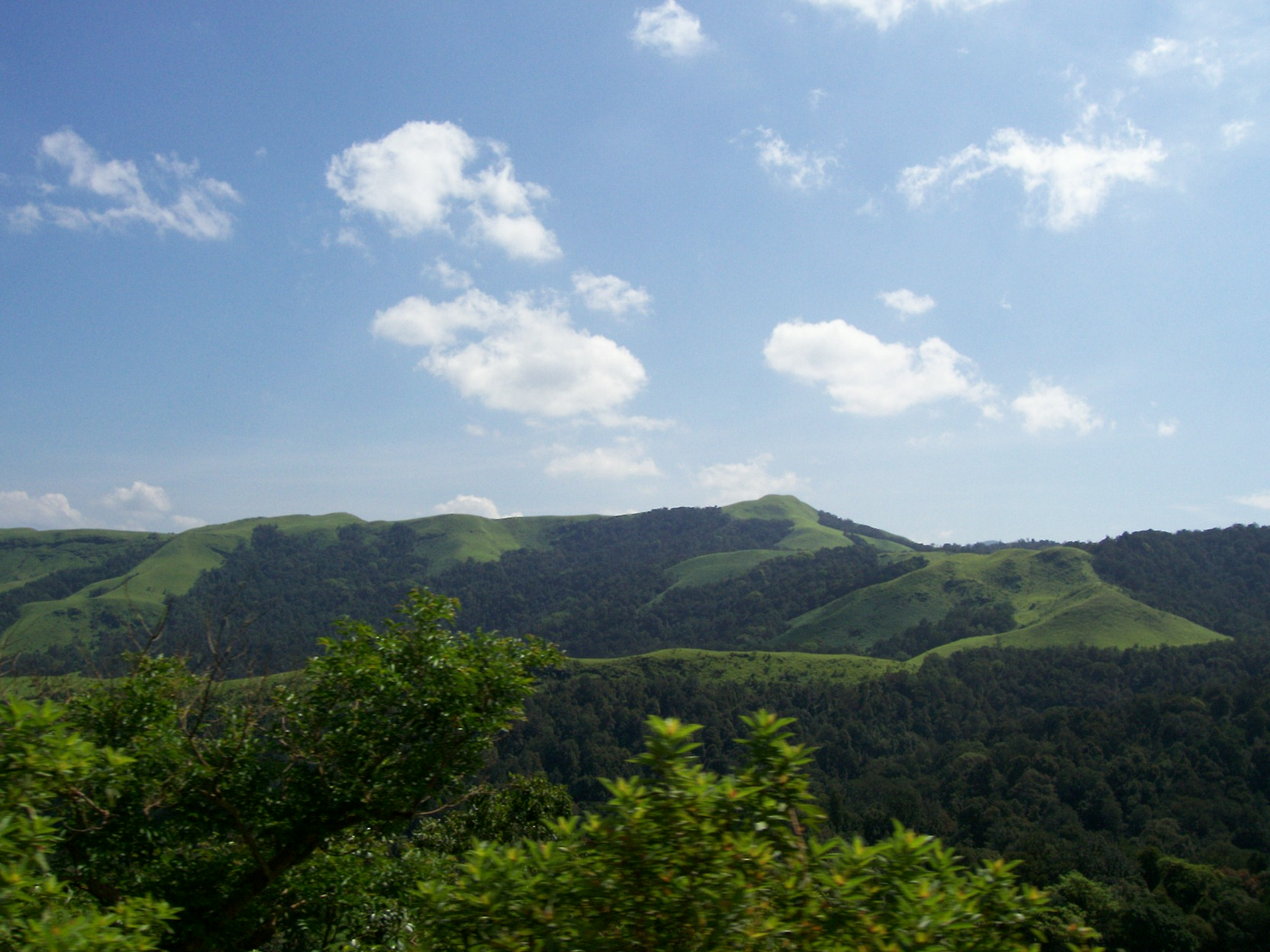
- Kudremukh National Park

- Location within Karnataka Location within India
- Interactive map of Kudremukh National Park
- Location: Chikmagalur and Dakshin Kannada districts Karnataka, India
- Area: 600.57 km^{2} (231.88 sq mi)

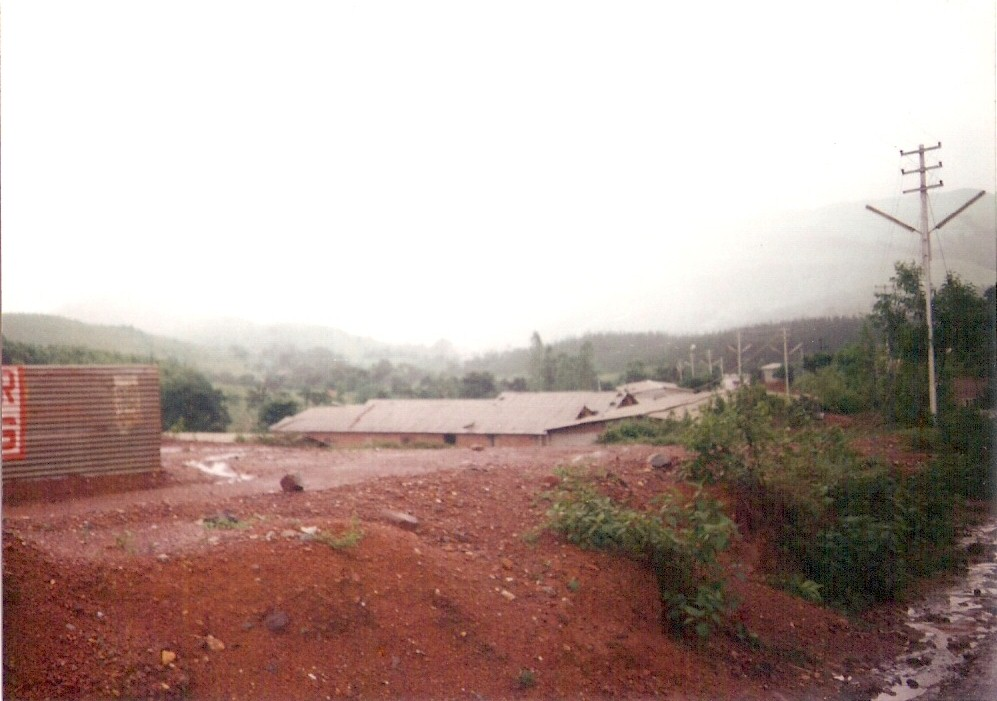
The Horse Faced Peak

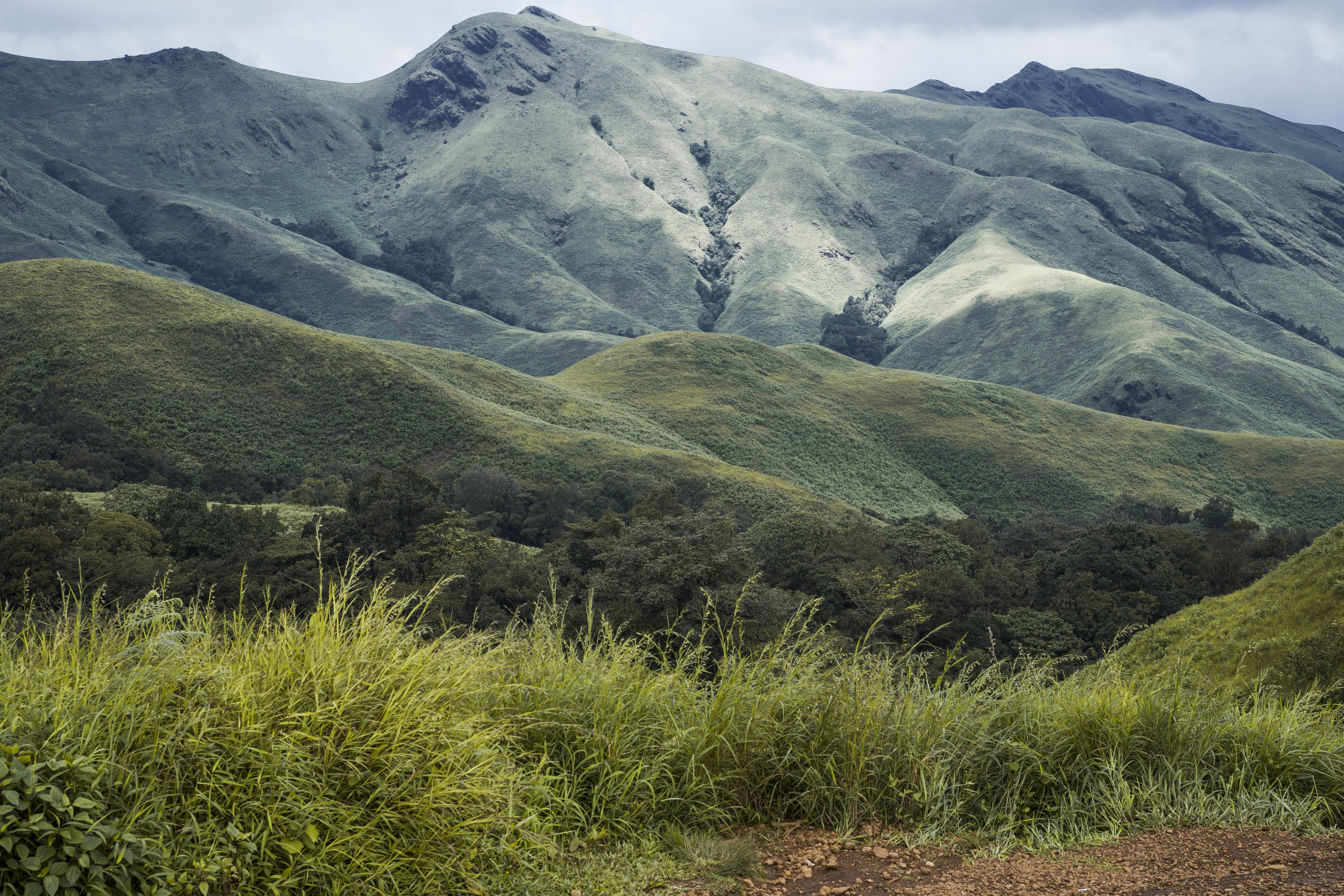
High-altitude grasslands in the park

Kudremukh National Park is a protected area in Chikmagalur and Dakshina Kannada districts of the Indian state of Karnataka. It is named after a mountain in Chikmagalur district. It is considered a biodiversity hotspot.

== Geography ==
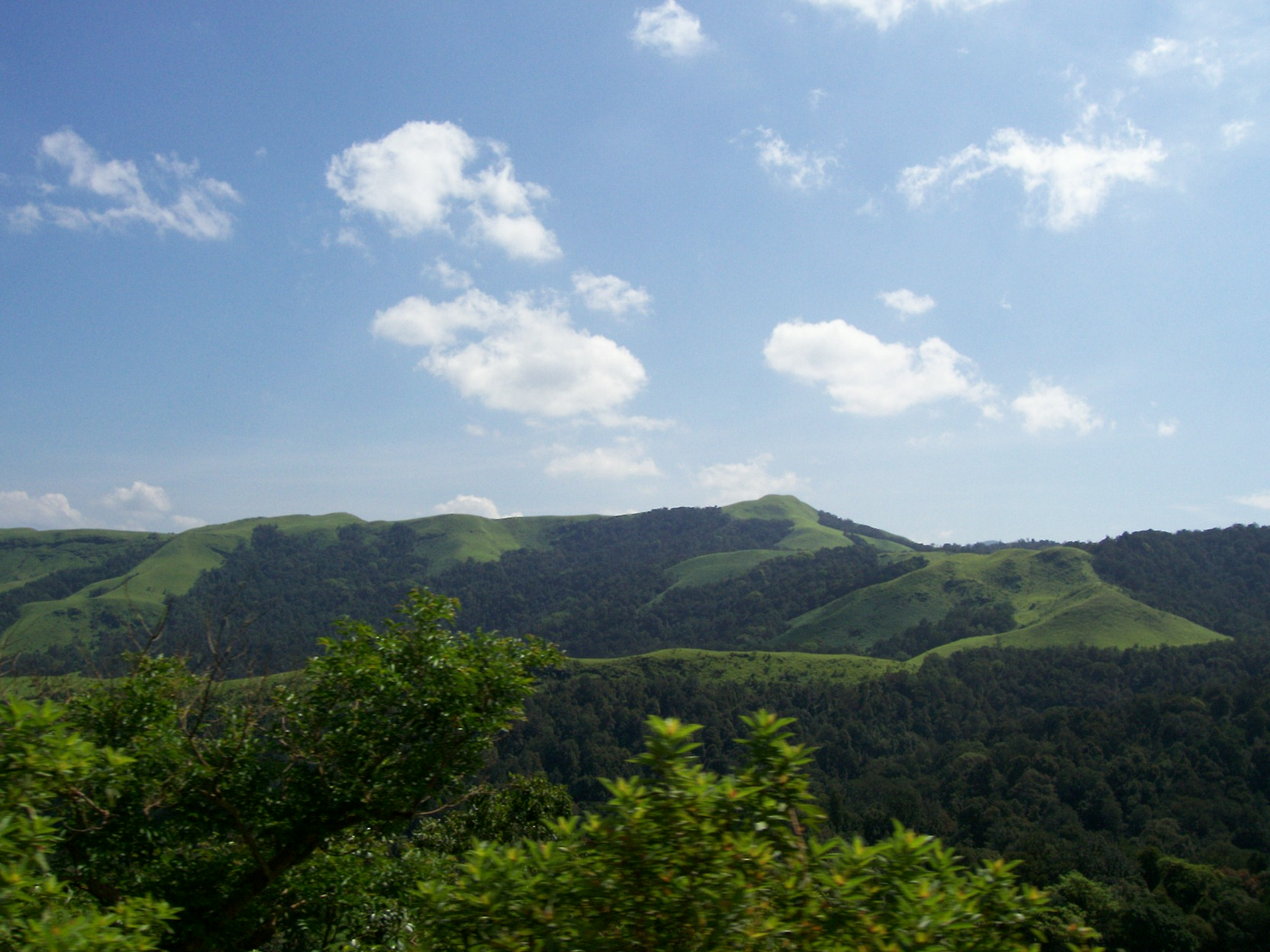
Panoramic View of mountains in the Kudremukh National Park

The park is adjoining to Someshwara Wildlife Sanctuary on the western side and is linked to Pushpagiri Wildlife Sanctuary through a narrow stretch of Reserved Forests on the southern edge. The southern & western sides of the Park form the steep slope of the Western Ghat ridge line, with the altitude varying from 100 m - 1892 m (peak). The northern, central and the eastern portions of the park form a chain of rolling hills with a mosaic of natural grassland and shola forest. Kudremukh receives an average annual rainfall of 7000 mm, which has evolved forest types of mainly evergreen or semi-evergreen climax forests in the region.

== Threats ==
KIOCL Plant at Kudremukh Kudremukh Iron Ore Company Limited (KIOCL) is a government run company which mines iron ore from the Kudremukh hills. KIOCL has been conducting its operations on an area of 46.0456 km^{2} for over 20 years.

Mining and processing ore in the area has caused habitat fragmentation.
