= Pushpagiri (mountain) =

Mountain in Karnataka, India

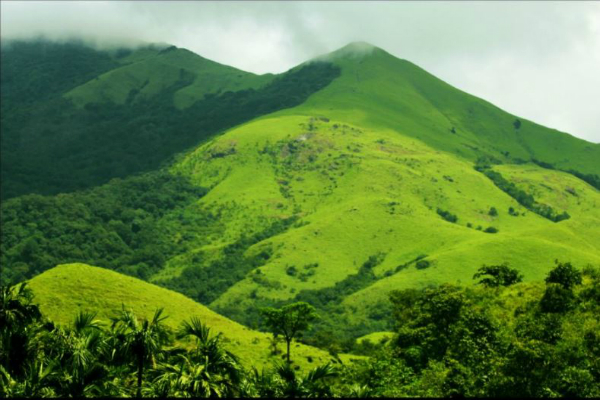
- Views on the way to Kumara Parvatha

Highest point
- Elevation: 1,712 m (5,617 ft)
- Coordinates: 12°40′00″N 75°41′00″E

Geography
- Location within Karnataka Location within India
- Location: Border of Sullia Taluk, Dakshina Kannada district, Sakaleshpur Taluk, Hassan District, Somvarpet Taluk, Kodagu district, Karnataka, India
- Parent range: Western Ghats

Climbing
- Easiest route: Hike

Pushpagiri, at 5,626 feet (1,715 m) ft, is the highest peak in Pushpagiri Wildlife Sanctuary, located along the Western Ghats of Karnataka. It is located in Somwarpete taluk, 20 kilometres (12 mi) from Somwarpet in the northern part of Kodagu district on the tri-junction between Dakshina Kannada, Kodagu and Hassan districts, It is 4th highest peak of Karnataka.

== Pushpagiri Mountains ==
The Pushpagiri or Subramanya Hill is the second-highest peak of Kodagu, and fourth highest peak in Karnataka

About 26 kilometres (16 mi) from Somwarpet and 1.5 kilometres (0.93 mi) from Kumaralli, it is located amid the jungle.

The Eastern entrance can be reached from Beedehalli via Heggademane temple and the Western entrance from Kukke Subramanya via Giri gadde. However, the entrance through Beedehalli is less strenuous.

The western entrance from Kukke Subramanya is located 165 metres (541 ft) above sea level, whereas the eastern entrance is at 900 metres (3,000 ft) above MSL.

The nearest airport is at Mangalore International Airport at a distance of 104 kilometres (65 mi). Trekkers have to obtain permission from the Forest department which is located near Batra Mane, which is also a spot for overnight camping. This place is at a distance of 6 kilometres (3.7 mi) from Kukke Subramanya.

== Mythology ==
It is believed that Lord Subramanya's footmark is presented in the hilltop temple. You can see the stone mark still. Top of the hill there are two temples, one is for Lord Shiva and other one for Lord Subramanya. It is believed that if any person has Sharpadosha it can be eliminated by visiting this temple.

== River source ==
This mountain, along with the surrounding hills and the evergreen Pushpagiri wildlife sanctuary, give rise to river Kumaradhara. It is the principal tributary of river Netravathi, that feeds the coastal city of Mangaluru.

== Climatic conditions ==
The climate is generally cool and wet. The climate is that of a highland, with no extreme variations. It receives heavy rainfall between June and September. From October to December the area is covered in mist almost all the time.

- Rainfall: Pushpagiri receive about 7,000 mm (280 in) rainfall every year. As a result, trekking is strictly prohibited from June to September.
- Temperature: November to January are generally the coldest months, with the daytime maximum temperatures that ranges of an average of around 7 to 14 °C (45 to 57 °F). April and May are normally the warmest months here, with temperatures of an average 20 °C (68 °F).
- Visibility: This place often enjoys good visibility, although hill fog sometimes restricts the visibility.

== Hiking at Pushpagiri ==
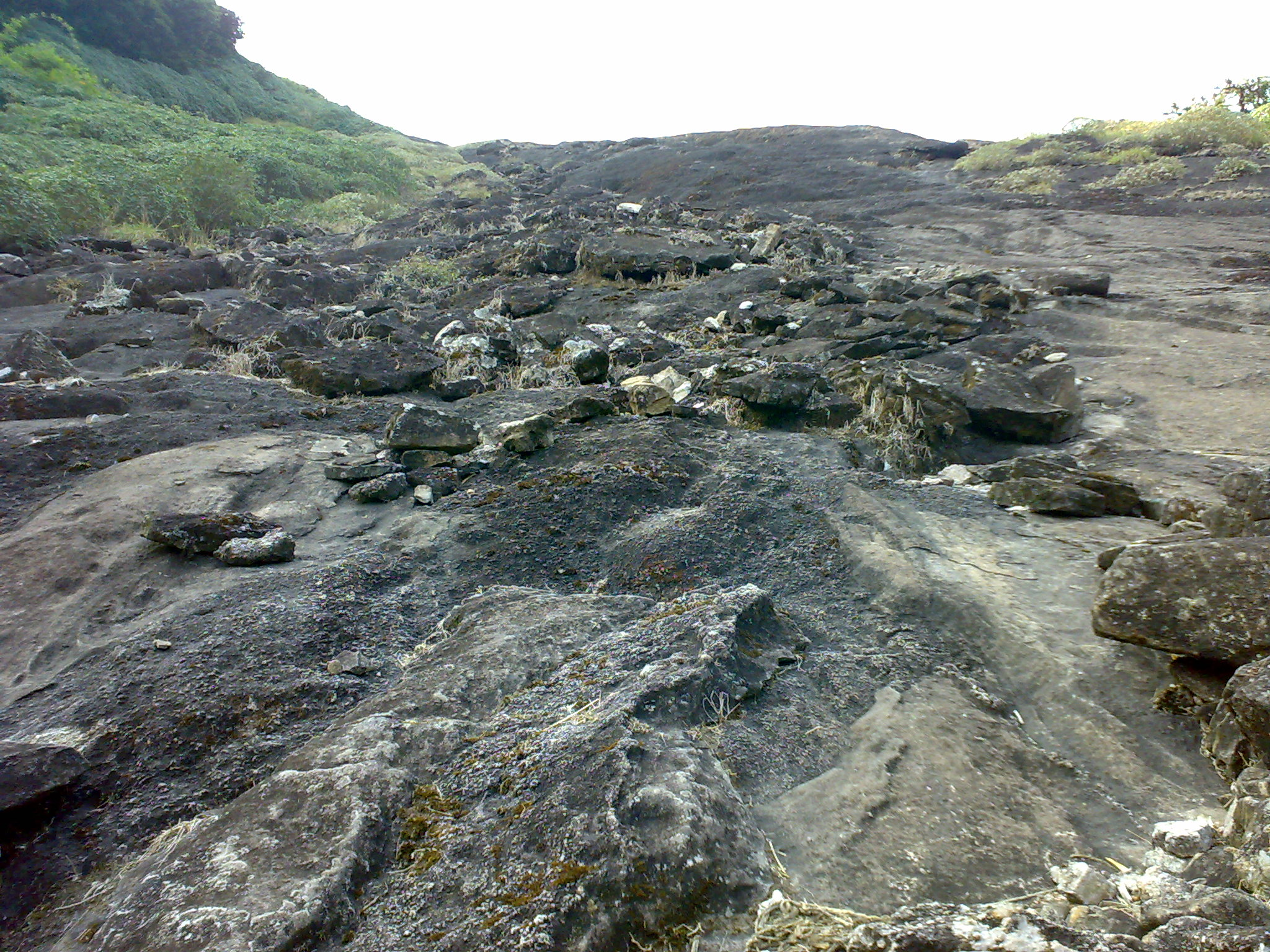
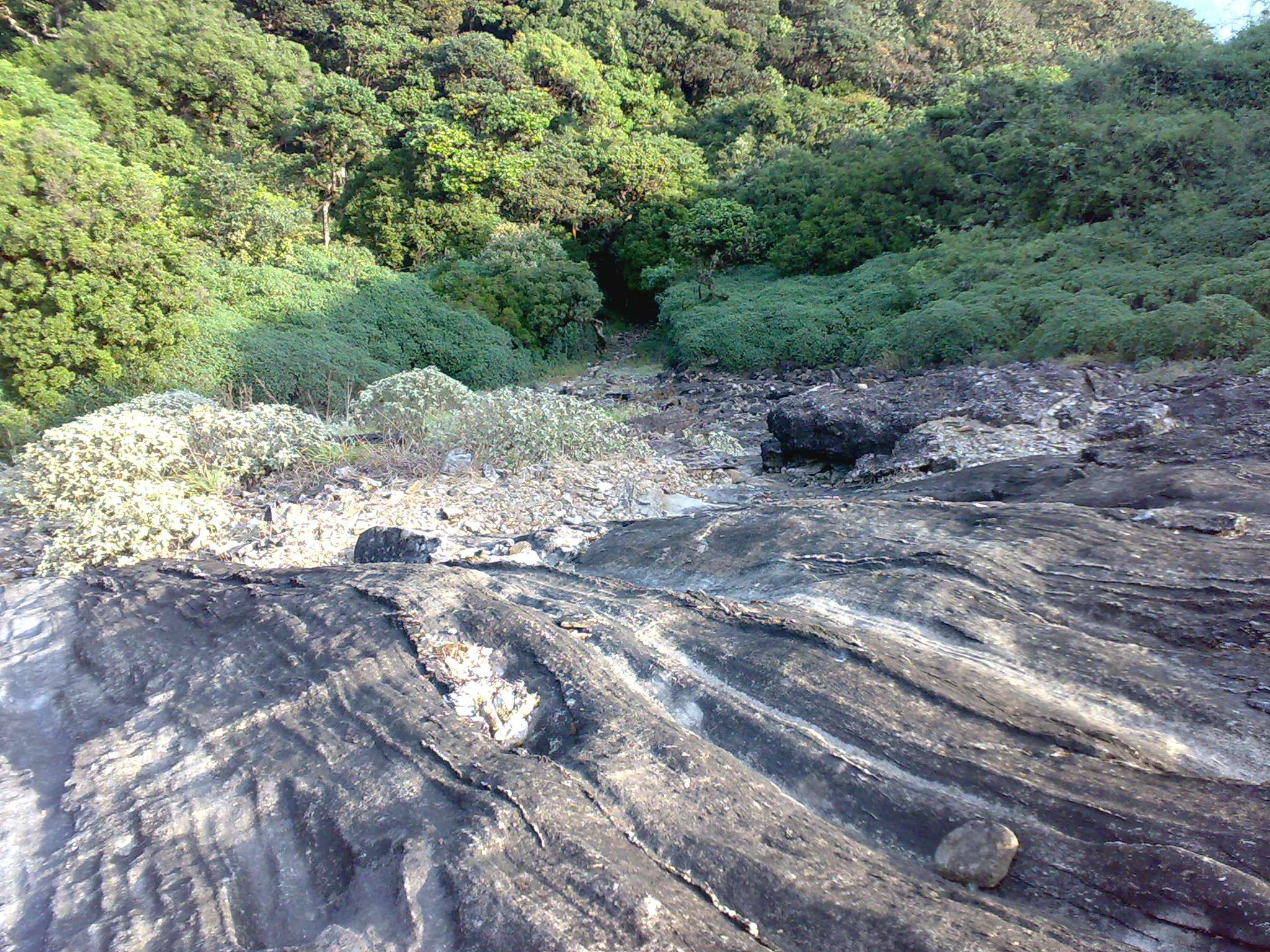
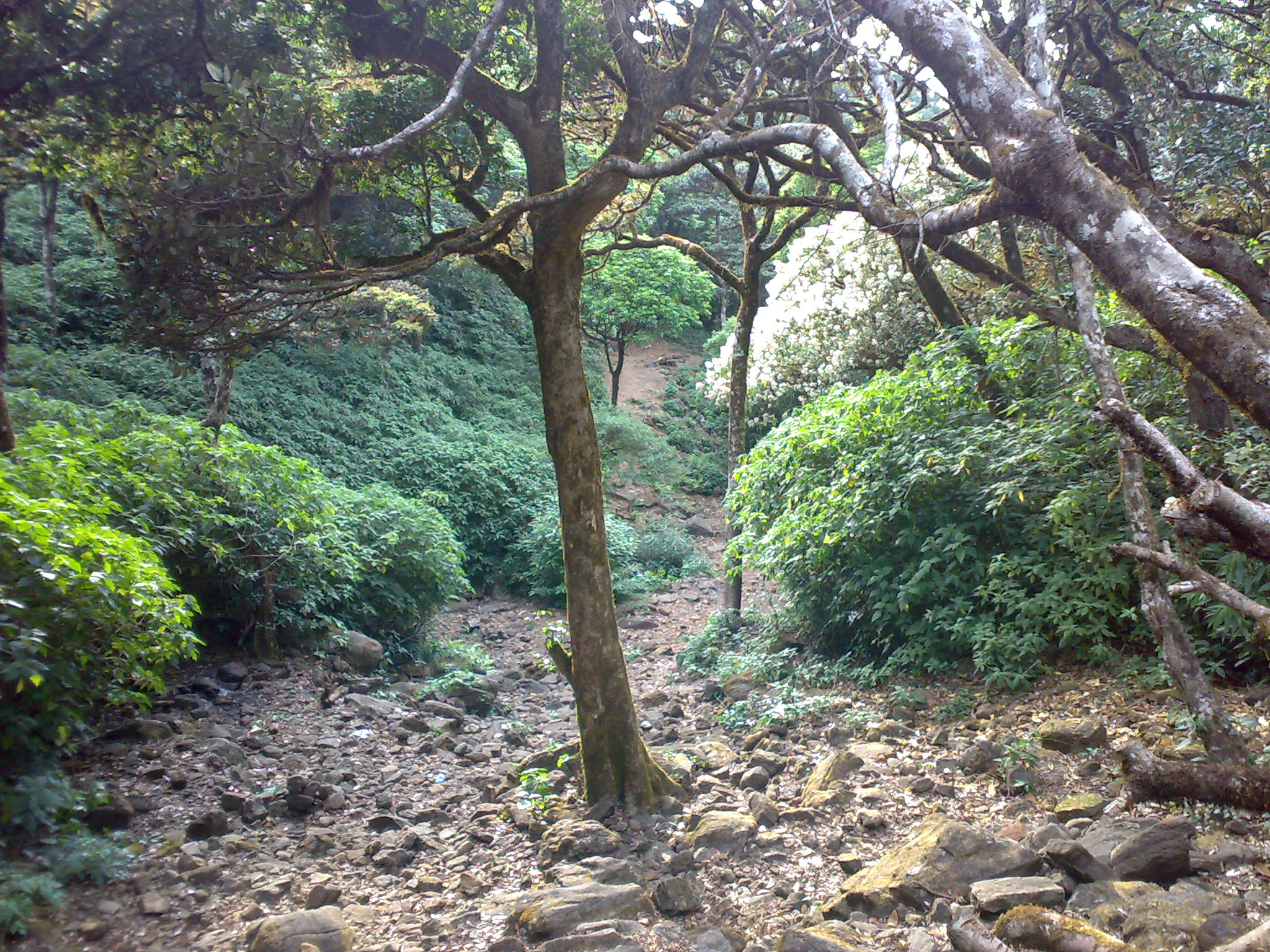
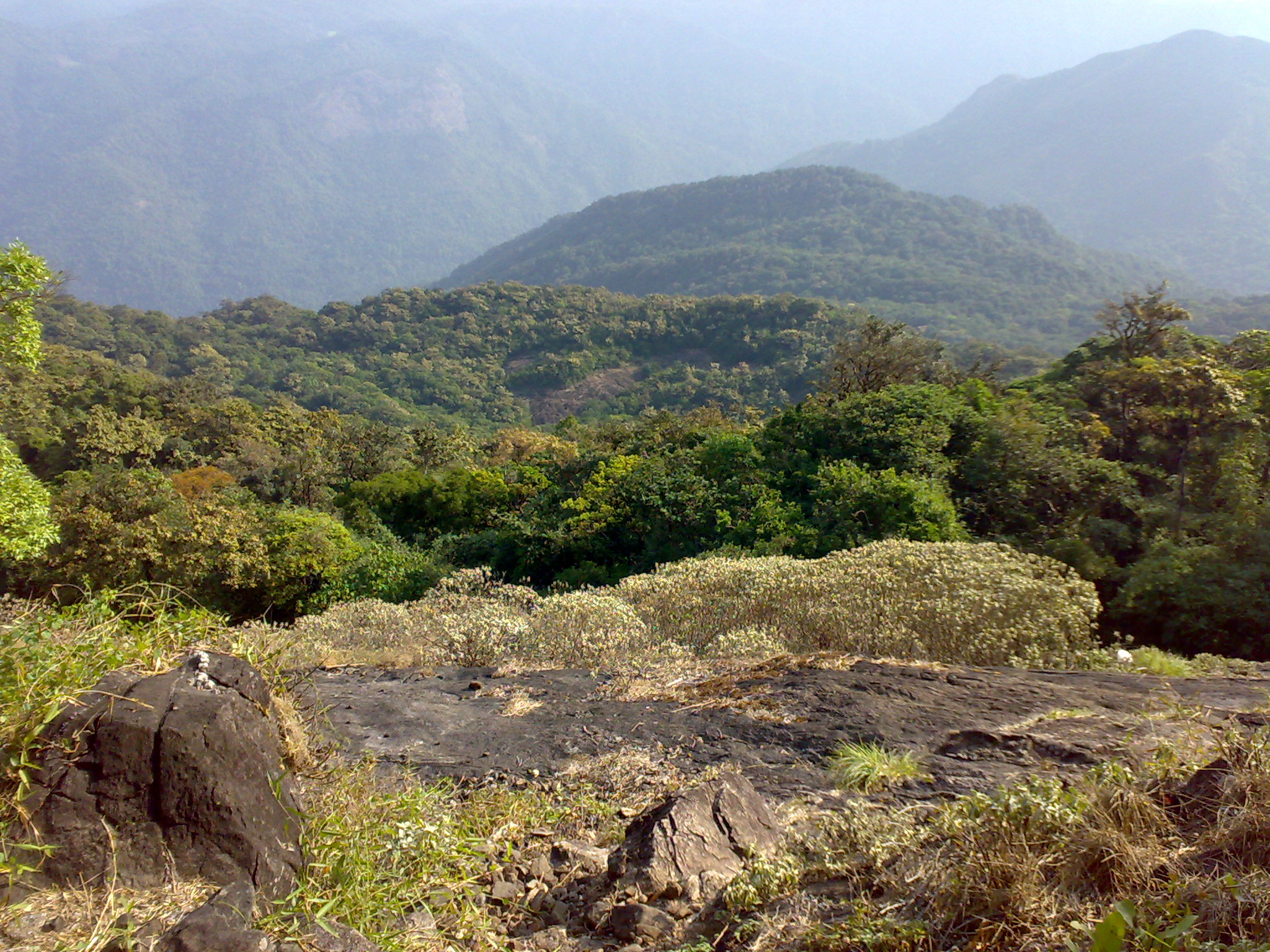
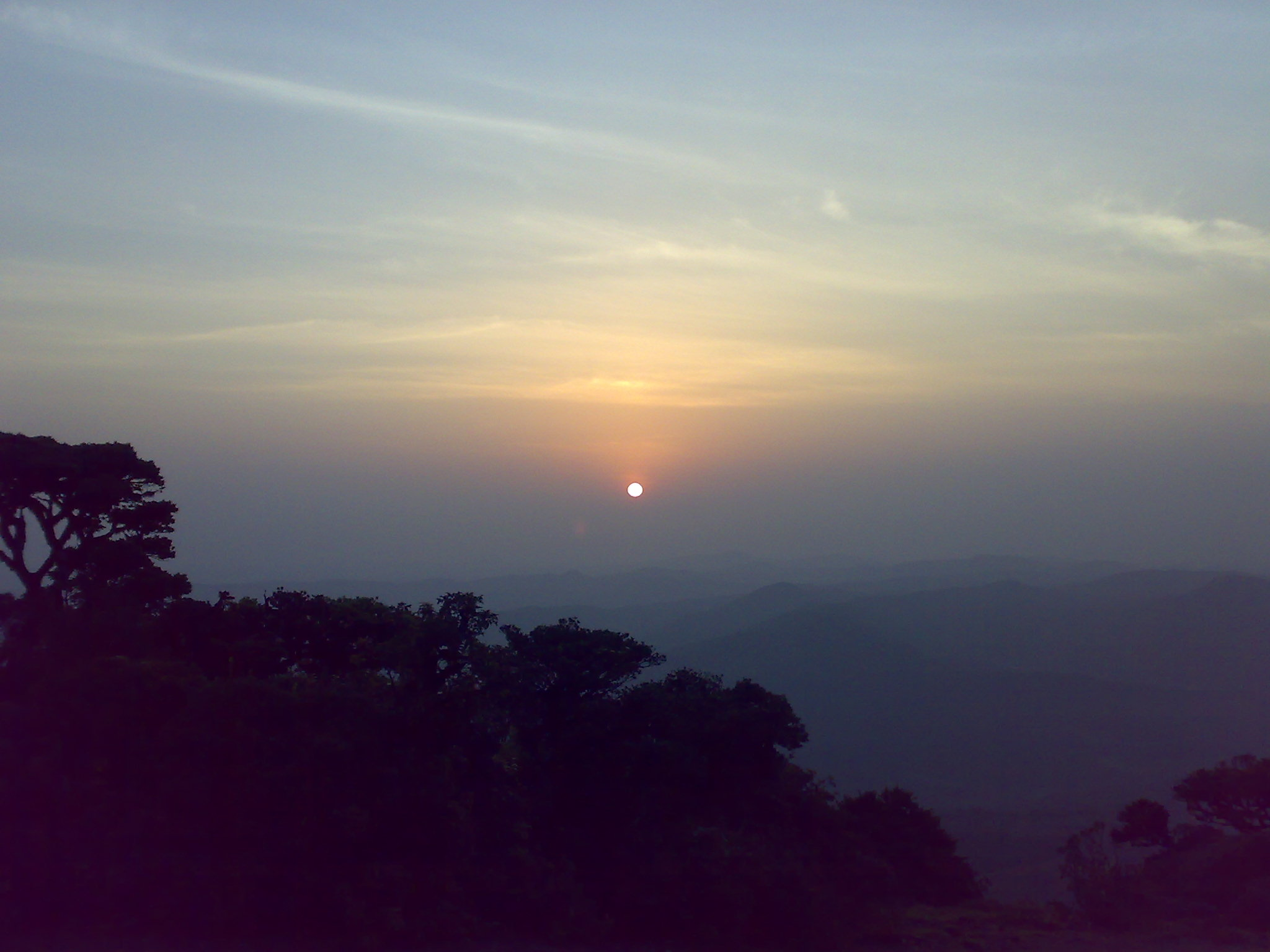
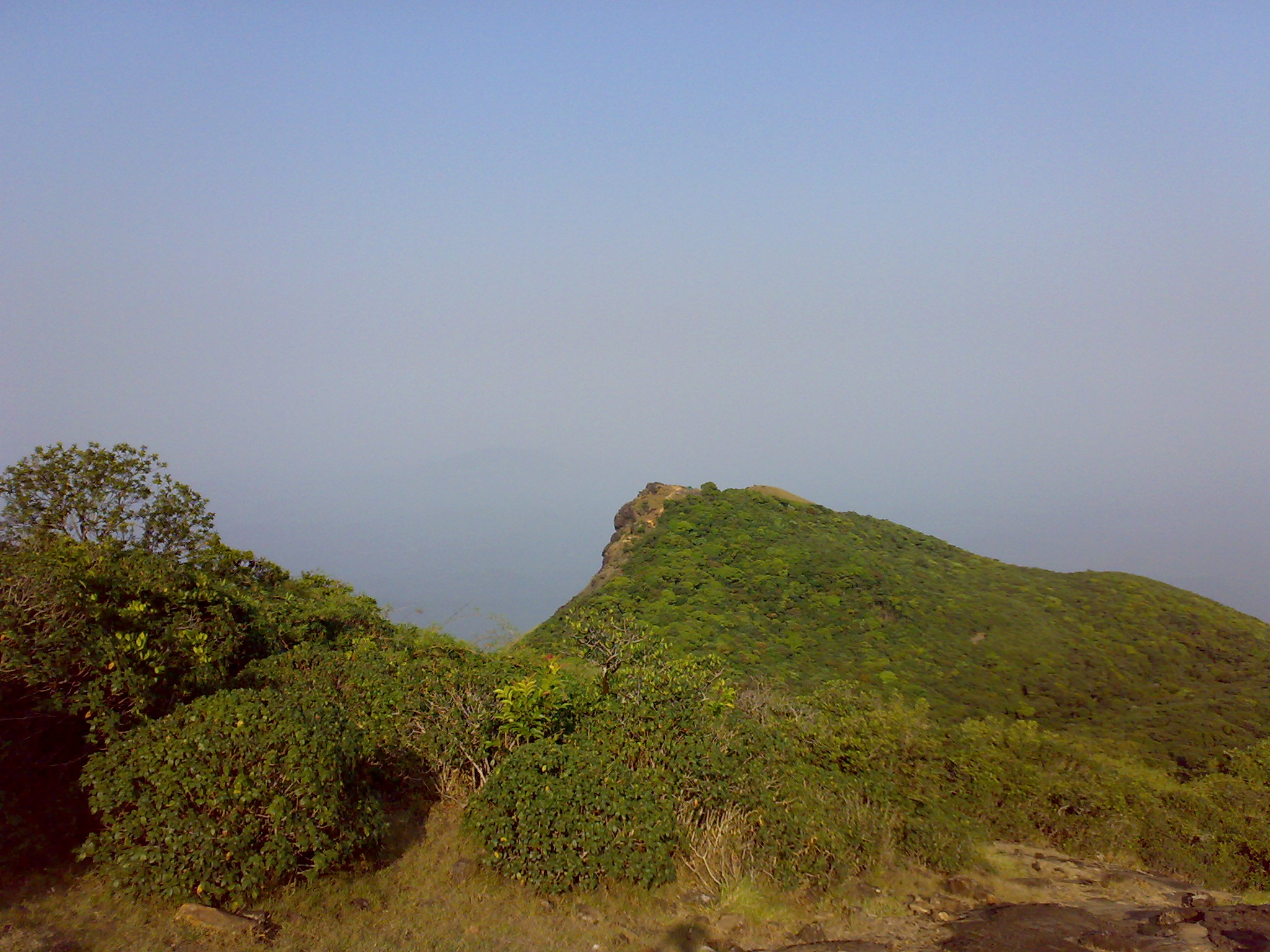
Hiking trails at Pushpagiri. Clockwise from upper left: Cliffs, Cliffs, Trail through woods, At the top, Sunrise, Kumara Parvata.

Pushpagiri is renowned among hiking and nature enthusiasts for its challenging trails, dense forests, panoramic viewpoints, and rich biodiversity. The trek is often considered one of the toughest and most rewarding hiking routes in South India. The region is home to several endemic species of flora and fauna, and the area has been designated as a proposed UNESCO World Heritage Site under the Western Ghats serial nominations.

=== Route and Access ===
The most common approach to the Pushpagiri peak begins from the Subramanya village in the Dakshina Kannada district, following a trail through Kukke Subramanya Temple, Battara Mane, and Girigadde. An alternative, shorter route starts from Beedehalli, near Somwarpet, providing access through the forest department’s entry point at Pushpagiri Wildlife Sanctuary.

The trail typically involves steep ascents, open grasslands, forested sections, and rocky scrambles, with landmarks such as Kallu Mantapa, Shesha Parvatha, and Girigadde serving as key resting points. The entire trek can take between 8–10 hours to complete, depending on the route and weather conditions.

=== Flora and Fauna ===
The Pushpagiri region supports a variety of vegetation types, including tropical evergreen forests, shola grasslands, and montane ecosystems. It is known to host rare species such as the Malabar grey hornbill, lion-tailed macaque, and Nilgiri langur. The sanctuary also features several streams that contribute to the headwaters of the Kumaradhara River.

=== Climate and Best Time to Visit ===
The ideal period for hiking is between November and February, when the skies are clear and temperatures are moderate. The monsoon months (June–September) bring heavy rainfall, leeches, and slippery terrain, making the trek more challenging and often restricted by forest authorities.

=== Cultural and Ecological Significance ===
Pushpagiri holds religious significance in local traditions, being associated with Lord Subramanya (Kartikeya). The mountain’s Sanskrit name, meaning "the blossom peak," reflects its ecological richness and the natural beauty that attracts trekkers, photographers, and conservationists alike.

Difficulty level	Strenuous
Approx Temperature	Max 30 °C (86 °F)
Accommodation type	They used to provide accommodation but now trek has to be completed in one day only.
Washrooms	At bhattramane and forest check post.
Food	Basic Veg food ( Rice, Sambar, Buttermilk, Pickle ) available at Bhattramane. Can carry your own lunch for the trek.
Distance from Bangalore International Airport	300 kilometres (190 mi)
Distance from Kannur International Airport	145 kilometres (90 mi)
Distance from Mangalore International Airport	158 kilometres (98 mi)
Total trekking distance	14 kilometres (8.7 mi) approx (one way)
Attraction	Pushpagiri Wildlife Sanctuary, Kukke Subramanya Temple

== See also ==
- Kukke Subramanya
- Madikeri
- Mandalapatti
- Mangalore
- Sakleshpur
- Mullayana Giri
- Baba Budan giri
- Brahmagiri
- Kodachadri
