= Mookambika Wildlife Sanctuary =

Wildlife sanctuary in Karnataka, India

- IUCN category IV (habitat/species management area)
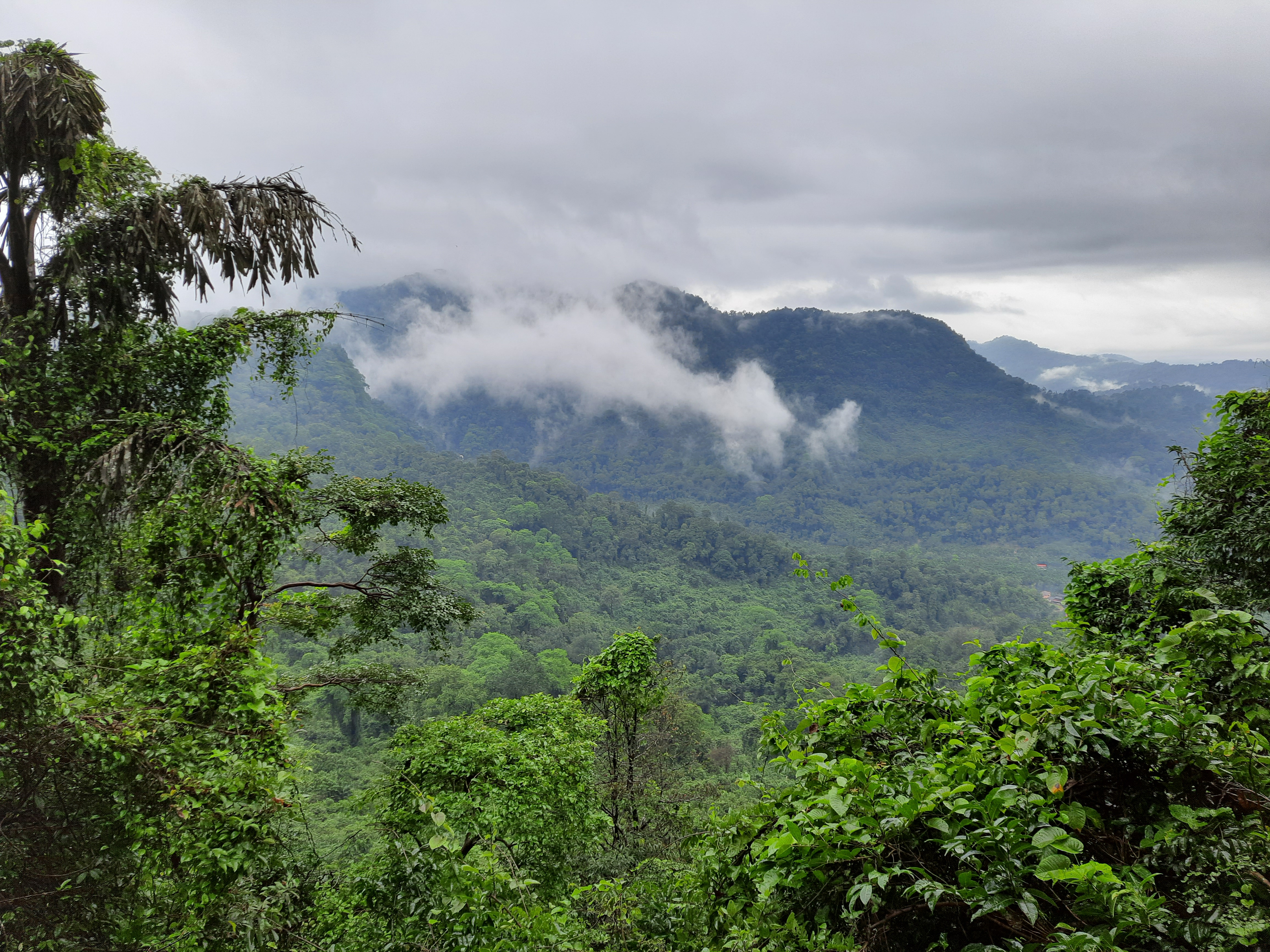

- Location within Karnataka Location within India
- Interactive map of Mookambika Wildlife Sanctuary
- Location: Udupi district, Karnataka,
- Nearest city: Kundapur, Udupi district
- Coordinates: 13°42′N 74°39′E
- Established: 1974

Mookambika Wildlife Sanctuary is a protected wildlife sanctuary in the southern state of Karnataka in India. It derives its name from the presiding deity "Goddess Mookambika" of the popular Kollur Mookambika Temple. The sanctuary lies in the Western Ghats in Udupi district of Karnataka. The sanctuary consists of an area of 274 km^{2} (106 sq mi) was notified in the year 1974, by the Government of Karnataka vide notification AFD.48.FWL.74 dated 17 June 1974.

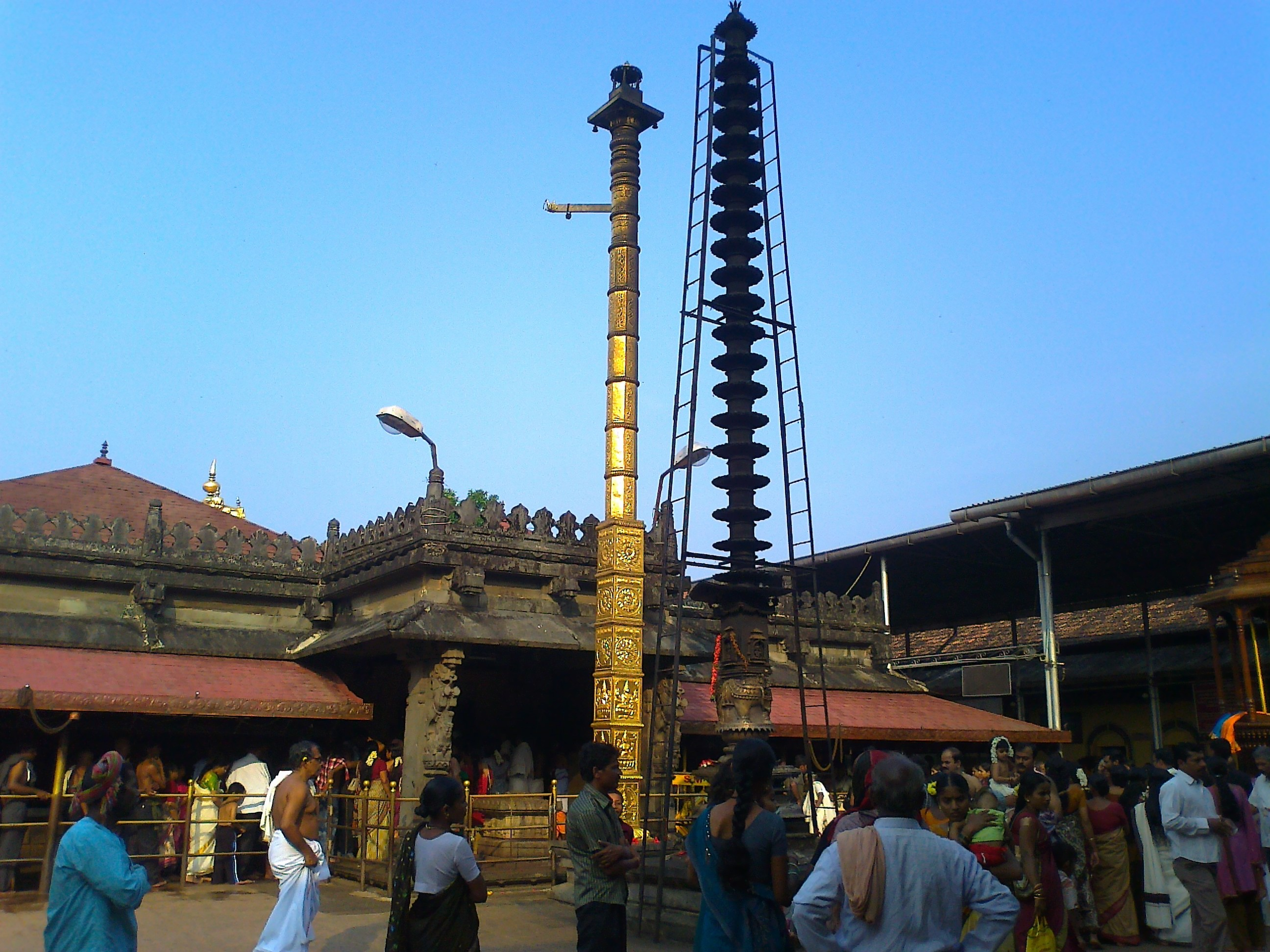
Kollur Mookambika Temple

This was subsequently expanded to 370.37 km^{2} (143.00 sq mi) vide notification No.KFD-48-FWL-74, dated: 22-05-1978/No.FEE-302-FWL-2011-(III), dated: 27-12-2011.

The expanded sanctuary comprises the Abbigudde, Baregundi, Chakra, Chittor, Gunduberu, Harmannupare, Hulikal, Hulimurdibare, Jannalane, Kilandur, Kodachadri, Korakoppadahola, Korathikalbare, Madibare, Meganivalley, Metkalgudda, Mudgalpare, Murkodihola, Naganakalbare, Nujinane, Talburane reserve forests.

The perennial Chakra and Sowparnika rivers flow through the sanctuary. The famed Kodachadri hills and Kollur Mookambika Temple is also found within the sanctuary.

The sanctuary has good road connectivity from Kundapur (35 km), Byndoor (25 km), and Shimoga (130 km). The nearest railway station is Mookambika Railway Station (28 km) at Byndoor. The nearest airport is located at Mangalore (Bajpe), which is 140 km away.

== Flora and fauna ==
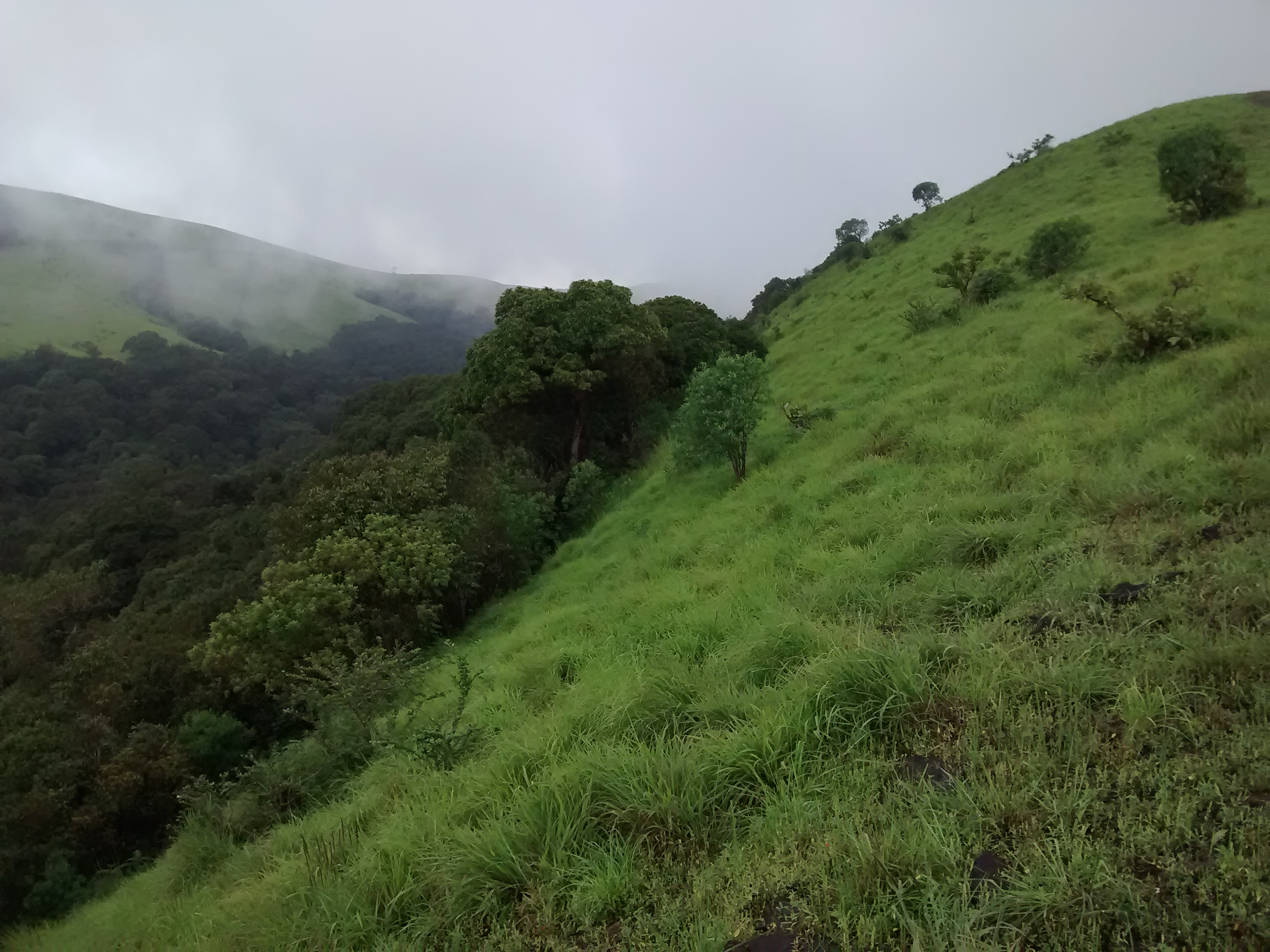
Kodachadri Hills

The Mookambika Wildlife Sanctuary has west coast tropical evergreen forests, west coast semi evergreen forests, southern secondary moist mixed deciduous forests and dry grasslands in its ranges.

The sanctuary has fauna like tiger, leopard, dhole (wild dog), jackal, sloth bear, Indian wild boar, Indian porcupine, sambar, spotted deer, muntjac (barking deer), mouse deer, gaur (Indian bison), Indian hare, lion tailed macaque, bonnet macaque, common langur, giant flying squirrel, king cobra, python etc.

Jungle myna, Peafowl, Great Indian hornbill, Malabar grey hornbill, Common fowl, Common myna, White cheeked bulbul, Red vented bulbul, Little cormorant, Cattle egret, Little egret, Black drongo, Jungle crow, Crow pheasant, Brahminy kite, Grey jungle fowl, Pea fowl, White breasted water hen, Red wattled lapwing, Spotted dove, Blue rock pigeon, White breasted king fisher, Golden backed threetoed wood pecker, Scarlet minivet, Ashy swallow shrike, Paradise fly catcher, Magpie robin, Tailor bird, Purple sunbird, White-rumped munia, Golden oriole.

== Other tourist attractions ==
Some of the other tourist attractions nearby are Anejhari Butterfly Camp, Arasinagundi Water Falls, Belkal Theertha Falls, Koosalli Waterfalls, Kollur Mookambika temple, Mudagal Cave Temple.
