= Pushpagiri Wildlife Sanctuary =

Wildlife sanctuary in India

- IUCN category IV (habitat/species management area)
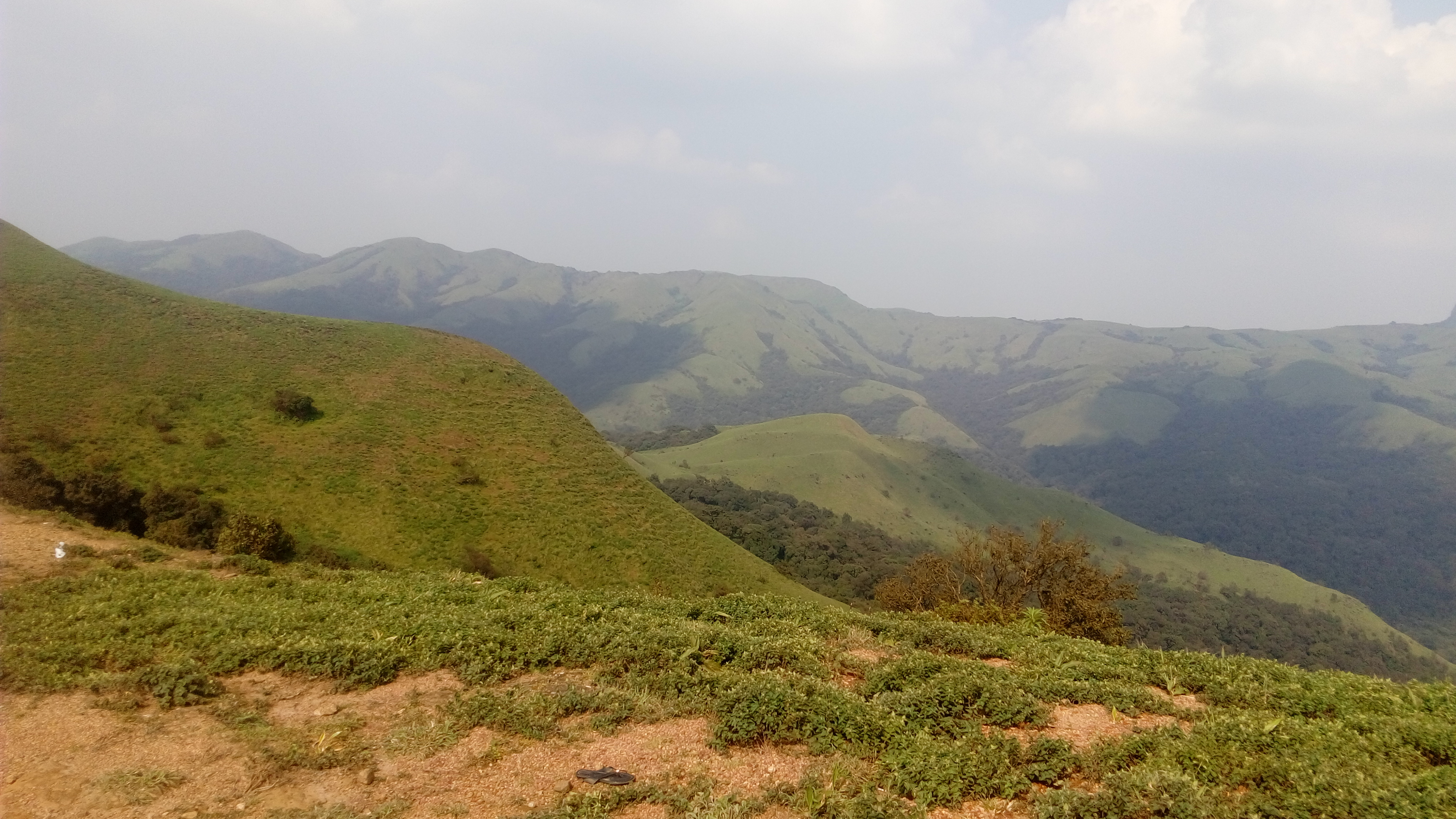
- Landscape of Shola Forests, Pushpagiri WLS

- Location within Karnataka Location within India
- Interactive map of Pushpagiri Wildlife Sanctuary
- Location: Somwarpet, Kodagu district, Karnataka, India
- Nearest city: Somwarpet
- Coordinates: 12°35′0″N 75°40′0″E
- Area: 102 km^{2} (39 sq mi)
- Governing body: Karnataka Forest Department

Pushpagiri Wildlife Sanctuary is one of the 21 Wildlife Sanctuaries in Karnataka, India.

This sanctuary is located in Somwarpet taluk of the Kodagu district. It is home to rare and endangered birdlife. The Kadamakkal reserve forest is a part of the sanctuary. Pushpagiri (Kumara Parvatha) is the highest peak in it. The sanctuary adjoins Bisle reserve forest to the north and Kukke Subramanya forest range to the west.

The Pushpagiri Wildlife Sancutuary has been proposed as one of the World Heritage Site.
