= Outline of Maharashtra =

Overview of and topical guide to Maharashtra

Location of Maharashtra

The following outline is provided as an overview of and topical guide to Maharashtra:

Maharashtra – state in the western region of India and is India's third-largest state by area and is also the world's second-most populous sub-national entity. It has over 120 million inhabitants and its capital, Mumbai, has a population of approximately 18 million. Nagpur is Maharashtra's second capital as decreed by the Nagpur Pact.

Seal of Maharashtra

== General reference ==
=== Names ===
- Common name: Maharashtra
- Pronunciation: English: /ˌmɑːhəˈrɑːʃtrə/ MAH-hə-RAH-shtrə, Marathi: [məɦaːˈɾaːʂʈɾə]
- Official name: Maharashtra
- Adjectivals: Maharashtrian
- Demonyms: Maharashtrians
- Abbreviations and name codes
  - ISO 3166-2 code: IN-MH
  - Vehicle registration code: MH

=== Rankings (amongst India's states) ===
- by population: 2nd
- by area (2011 census): 3rd
- by crime rate (2015): 8th
- by gross domestic product (GDP) (2014): 1st
- by Human Development Index (HDI):
- by life expectancy at birth:
- by literacy rate:

== Geography of Maharashtra ==
Geography of Maharashtra

- Maharashtra is: an Indian state
- Population of Maharashtra:
- Area of Maharashtra:
- Atlas of Maharashtra

=== Location of Maharashtra ===
- Maharashtra is situated within the following regions:
  - Northern Hemisphere
  - Eastern Hemisphere
    - Eurasia
      - Asia
        - South Asia
          - India
            - West India
- Time zone: Indian Standard Time (UTC+05:30)

=== Environment of Maharashtra ===
==== Protected areas in Maharashtra ====
- Navegaon National Park
- Nagzira wildlife sanctuary
- Tadoba Andhari Tiger Project
- Pench National Park
- Chandoli National Park
- Gugamal National Park
- Sanjay Gandhi National Park
- Sagareshwar Wildlife Sanctuary
- Maldhok Sanctuary
- Tansa wildlife Sanctuary
- Bhimashankar wildlife Sanctuary.
- Phansad Wildlife Sanctuary
- Koyna Wildlife Sanctuary
- Matheran

==== Natural geographic features of Maharashtra ====
- Rivers of Maharashtra

=== Regions of Maharashtra ===
Regions of Maharashtra

==== Ecoregions of Maharashtra ====
Ecoregions in Maharashtra

==== Administrative divisions of Maharashtra ====
Administrative divisions of Maharashtra

- Districts of Maharashtra
  - Municipalities of Maharashtra

===== Districts of Maharashtra =====
- Districts of Maharashtra

===== Municipalities of Maharashtra =====
Municipalities of Maharashtra

- Capital of Maharashtra: Capital of Maharashtra
- Cities of Maharashtra

=== Demography of Maharashtra ===
Religion in Maharashtra
Hindus	83.2%
Muslim	12%
Others	4.8%

Religion	Fertility rate
Hindus	2.23
Muslims	4.09
Christians	1.41
Jains	1.41
Buddhist	2.24
Sikh	1.57
Tribals	3.14
others	2.25

Demographics of Maharashtra

== Government and politics of Maharashtra ==
Politics of Maharashtra

- Form of government: Indian state government (parliamentary system of representative democracy)
- Capital of Maharashtra: Capital of Maharashtra
- Elections in Maharashtra
  - (specific elections)

=== Union government in Maharashtra ===
- Rajya Sabha members from Maharashtra
- Maharashtra Pradesh Congress Committee
- Indian general election, 2009 (Maharashtra)
- Indian general election, 2014 (Maharashtra)

=== Branches of the government of Maharashtra ===
Government of Maharashtra

==== Executive branch of the government of Maharashtra ====
- Head of state: Governor of Maharashtra,
- Head of government: Chief Minister of Maharashtra,
- Council of Ministers of Maharashtra

==== Legislative branch of the government of Maharashtra ====
Maharashtra Legislative Assembly

- Constituencies of Maharashtra Legislative Assembly

==== Judicial branch of the government of Maharashtra ====
- High Court of Maharashtra
  - Chief Justice of Maharashtra

=== Law and order in Maharashtra ===
- Law enforcement in Maharashtra
  - Maharashtra Police

== History of Maharashtra ==
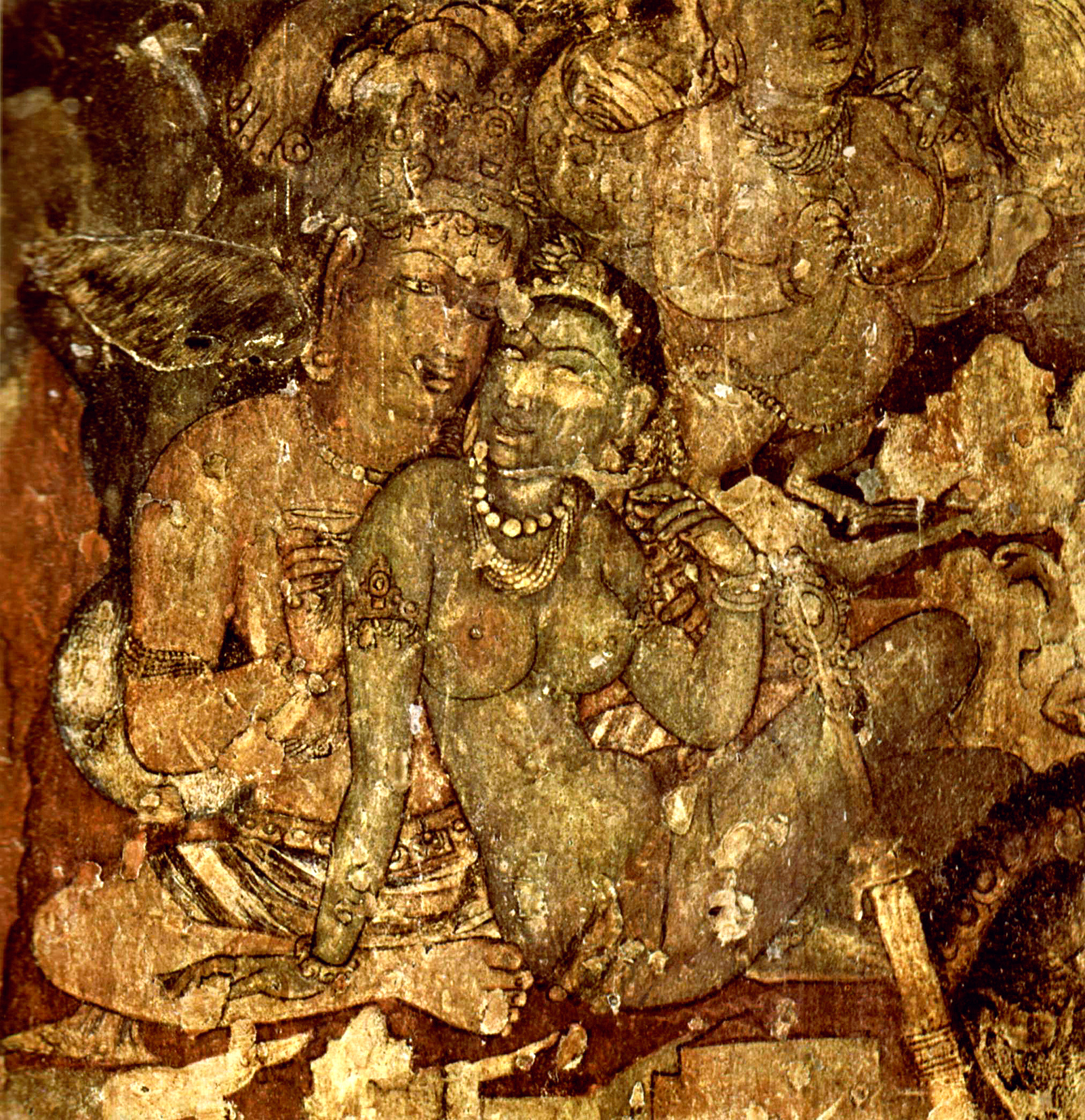
Painting from the Ajanta Caves in Aurangabad, Maharashtra, sixth century

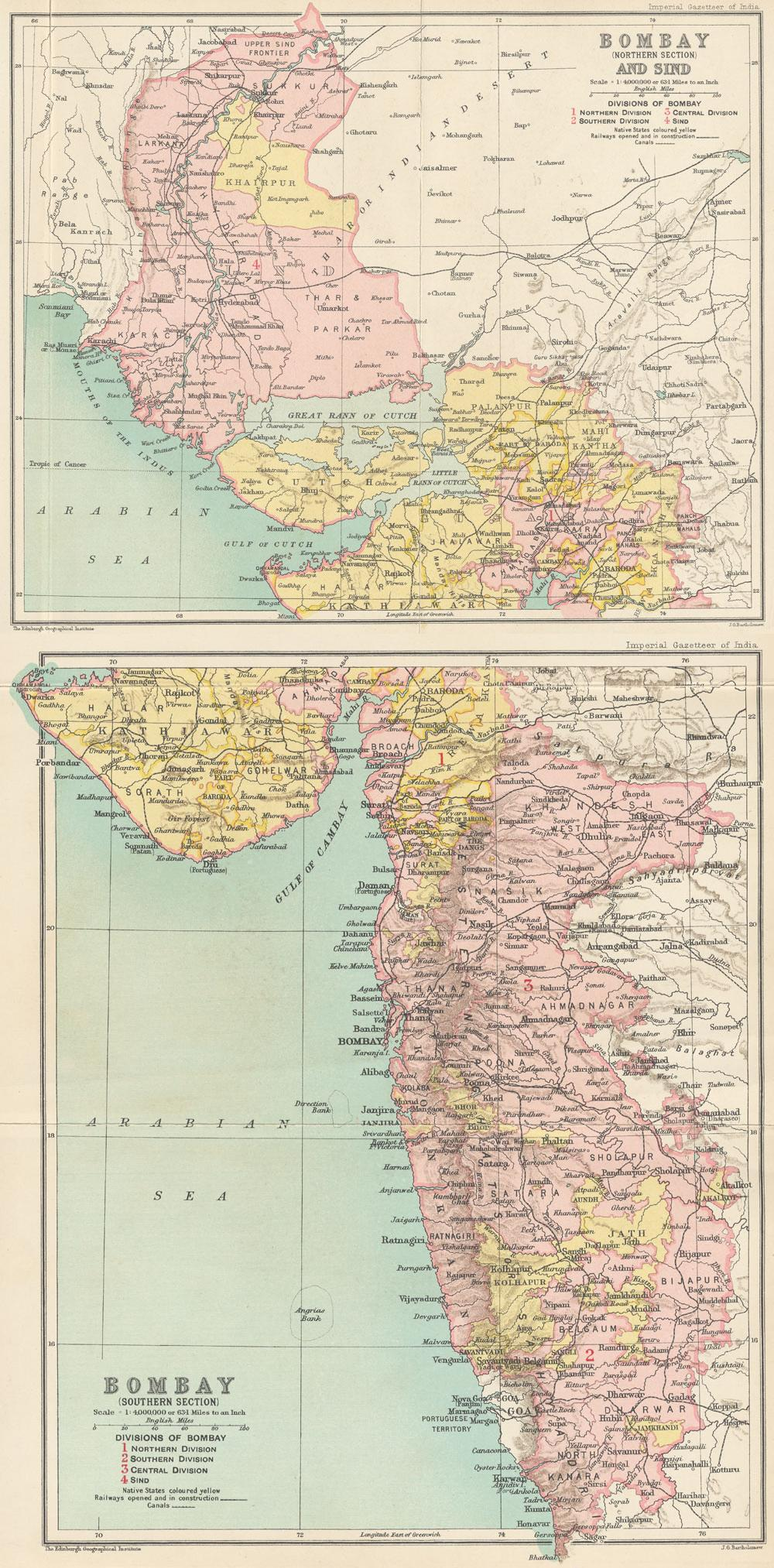
Maharashtra, as part of the Bombay Presidency in 1909

History of Maharashtra

=== History of Maharashtra, by period ===
- Mauryan
- Ashoka
- Hiuen-Tsang
- Dakshinapatha
- Satakarni
- Kharavela
- Western Satraps
- Gupta Empire
- Gurjara-Pratihara
- Vakataka
- Kadambas
- Chalukya Empire
- Rashtrakuta Dynasty
- Western Chalukya
- Yadava dynasty
- Delhi Sultanate
- Ala-ud-din Khalji
- Muhammad bin Tughluq
- Daulatabad
- Bahmani Sultanate
- Nizamshah
- Ahmadnagar Sultanate
- Adilshah
- Qutubshah
- Bidarshah
- Imadshah
- Vijayanagara Empire
- Sultanate of Gujarat
- Faruqi dynasty
- Adil Shahi dynasty
- Third Anglo-Maratha War
- Bombay Presidency
- Nagpur Province
- Central Provinces
- Berar
- Operation Polo

==== Colonial Maharashtra ====
  - Bombay Presidency
    - Bombay State
      - Maharashtra

==== Contemporary Maharashtra ====
- Chronology of statehood of Maharashtra

== Culture of Maharashtra ==
Culture of Maharashtra

- Architecture of Maharashtra
- Cuisine of Maharashtra
- Monuments in Maharashtra
  - Monuments of National Importance in Maharashtra
  - State Protected Monuments in Maharashtra
- World Heritage Sites in Maharashtra

=== Art in Maharashtra ===
- Music of Maharashtra

==== Cinema of Maharashtra ====
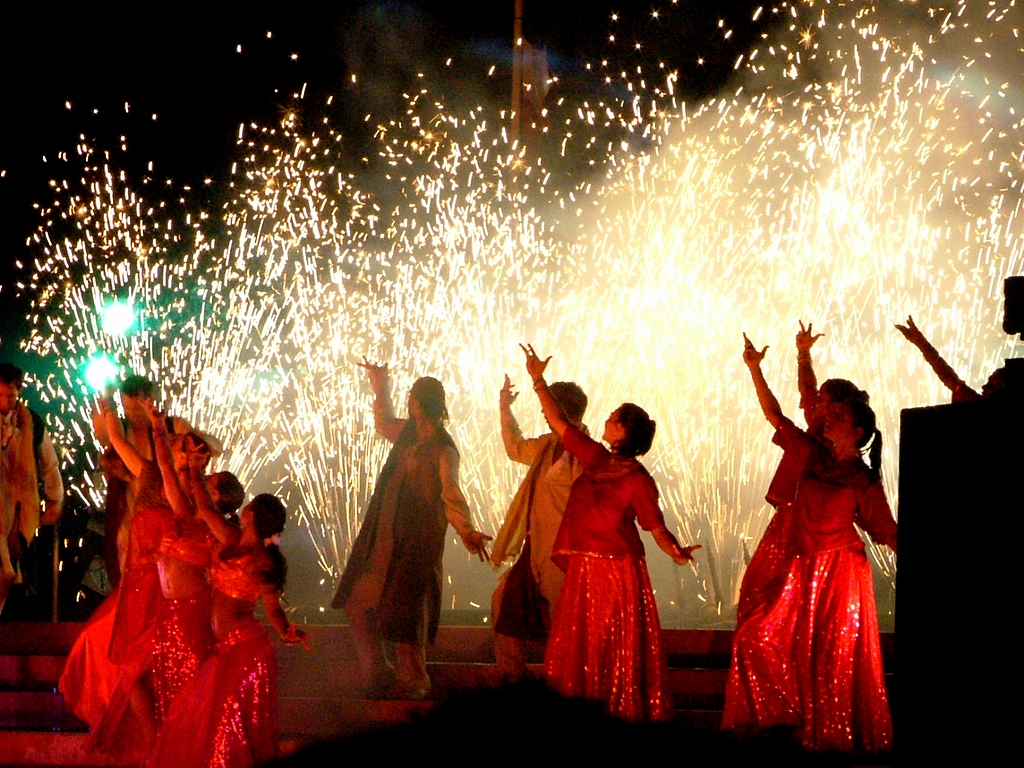
Bollywood is based in Mumbai

Cinema of Maharashtra

- Hindi Cinema
- Marathi cinema

=== Languages of Maharashtra ===
- Languages of Maharashtra
  - Marathi
  - Ahirani
  - Konkani
  - Malvani
  - Varhadi

=== People of Maharashtra ===
- People from Maharashtra

=== Religion in Maharashtra ===
Religion in Maharashtra

- Christianity in Maharashtra
- Hinduism in Maharashtra
- Jainism in Maharashtra
- Islam in Maharashtra

=== Sports in Maharashtra ===
Sports in Maharashtra

- Cricket in Maharashtra
  - Maharashtra Cricket Association
  - Maharashtra cricket team
- Football in Maharashtra
  - Maharashtra football team

=== Symbols of Maharashtra ===
Symbols of Maharashtra

- Animal: Indian giant squirrel
- Bird: Yellow-footed green pigeon
- Butterfly: Papilio polymnestor (Blue Mormon)
- Dance: Lavani
- Fish:
- Flower: Lagerstroemia
- Song: "Jai Jai Maharashtra Majha"
- Sport: Kabaddi
- Tree: Mango

== Economy and infrastructure of Maharashtra ==
Economy of Maharashtra

- Tourism in Maharashtra
- Transport in Maharashtra
  - Airports in Maharashtra

== Education in Maharashtra ==
Education in Maharashtra

- Institutions of higher education in Maharashtra

== Health in Maharashtra ==
Health in Maharashtra

== See also ==
- Outline of India
- Tourism in Maharashtra
- Maratha Empire
- List of Maratha dynasties and states
- Maratha
- Marathi people
- Marathi language
