= Religion in Maharashtra =

Religious demographics in Maharashtra

Religion in Maharashtra (2011)
1. Hinduism (79.8%)
2. Islam (11.5%)
3. Buddhism (5.81%)
4. Jainism (1.25%)
5. Christianity (0.96%)
6. Sikhism (0.20%)
7. Other (0.41%)

Religion in Maharashtra is characterised by the diversity of religious beliefs and practices.

According to the 2011 census, Hinduism was the principal religion in the state at 79.83% of the total population, while Muslims constituted 11.54% of the total population. Maharashtra has India's largest Buddhist and Jain populations. Buddhism accounted for 5.81% in Maharashtra's total population, with 6.53 million followers, which is 77% of all Buddhists in India. Jains, Christians and Sikhs constituted 1.25%, 0.96%, 0.2% of the population respectively. Maharashtra also is home to the Parsi (Zoroastrian) community and has a community of Jews known as Bene Israel.

== Statistics ==
Religion in Maharashtra as per census
Religion	1951	1961	1971	1981	1991	2001	2011
Hinduism	28,642,304	32,530,901	41,307,287	51,109,457	64,033,213	77,859,385	89,703,057
Islam	2,436,357	3,034,332	4,233,023	5,805,785	7,628,755	10,270,485	12,971,152
Buddhism	2,487	2,789,501	3,264,223	3,946,139	5,040,785	5,838,710	6,531,200
Jainism	337,578	485,672	703,664	939,392	965,840	1,301,843	1,400,349
Christianity	433,290	560,594	717,174	795,464	885,030	1,058,313	1,080,073
Sikhism	41,434	57,617	101,762	107,255	161,184	215,337	223,247
Other	109,114	95,101	85,102	74,386	122,612	236,841	178,965
Not stated	n/a	n/a	n/a	6,293	99,768	97,713	286,290
Total	32,002,564	39,553,718	50,412,235	62,784,171	78,937,187	96,878,627	112,374,333

* starting in 1956 most people belonging mostly to the Mahar community have converted from Hinduism to Buddhism in Maharashtra

Religion in Maharashtra (%)
Religion	1951	1961	1971	1981	1991	2001	2011
Hinduism	89.50	82.24	81.94	81.40	81.12	80.37	79.83
Islam	7.61	7.67	8.40	9.25	9.66	10.60	11.54
Buddhism	0.01	7.05	6.47	6.28	6.38	6.03	5.81
Jainism	1.06	1.23	1.40	1.50	1.22	1.34	1.25
Christianity	1.35	1.42	1.42	1.27	1.13	1.09	0.96
Sikhism	0.13	0.15	0.20	0.17	0.20	0.22	0.20
Other	0.34	0.24	0.17	0.12	0.16	0.24	0.17
Not stated	n/a	n/a	n/a	0.01	0.13	0.11	0.25
Total	100	100	100	100	100	100	100

=== District-wise ===
District	Population (2011)	Religion-wise population (2011)															
District	Population (2011)	Hinduism		Islam		Buddhism		Jainism		Christianity		Sikhism		Others		Not stated	
District	Population (2011)	Pop	%	Pop	%	Pop	%	Pop	%	Pop	%	Pop	%	Pop	%	Pop	%
Ahmednagar	45,43,159	4107143	90.40	320743	7.06	33898	0.75	38718	0.85	22766	0.5	5431	0.12	1408	0.03	13052	0.29
Akola	18,13,906	1107809	61.07	357253	19.69	328033	18.08	10205	0.56	4483	0.25	1504	0.08	389	0.03	4230	0.24
Amravati	28,88,445	2055177	71.15	421410	14.59	383891	13.29	11360	0.39	7223	0.25	2242	0.07	3288	0.12	7223	0.25
Aurangabad	37,01,282	2545438	68.77	786677	21.25	309093	8.35	30981	0.84	15991	0.43	5142	0.14	1005	0.03	6955	0.19
Beed	25,85,049	2174672	84.13	320395	12.39	68482	2.65	8719	0.34	2097	0.08	824	0.03	399	0.02	9461	0.36
Bhandara	12,00,334	1009352	84.08	26502	2.21	154458	12.86	2145	0.18	1017	0.09	831	0.08	3555	0.29	2474	0.21
Buldhana	25,86,258	1845424	71.36	354236	13.69	364229	14.09	12242	0.47	3531	0.14	1668	0.06	552	0.02	4406	0.17
Chandrapur	22,04,307	1780085	80.75	92297	4.19	286734	13.01	3861	0.17	10701	0.49	5251	0.25	23188	1.05	2190	0.09
Dhule	20,50,862	1825460	89.01	187901	9.16	13405	0.65	12818	0.63	3653	0.18	1422	0.07	912	0.04	5291	0.26
Gadchiroli	10,72,942	927411	86.44	21063	1.96	82695	7.71	454	0.04	3872	0.36	681	0.06	30047	2.80	6791	0.63
Gondia	13,22,507	1153861	87.25	26157	1.98	125282	9.47	1568	0.13	1827	0.14	2160	0.16	5080	0.38	6572	0.49
Hingoli	11,77,345	863199	73.31	127552	10.83	176679	15.01	5278	0.45	992	0.08	643	0.06	103	0.01	2899	0.25
Jalgaon	42,29,917	3457615	81.74	560261	13.24	143865	3.40	27404	0.65	7091	0.17	3091	0.08	9662	0.23	20928	0.49
Jalna	19,59,046	1504641	76.80	274221	13.99	152540	7.79	9619	0.49	12542	0.64	1629	0.10	336	0.01	3518	0.18
Kolhapur	38,76,001	3379906	87.20	286558	7.39	29766	0.77	154882	3.99	15573	0.40	1570	0.05	1274	0.04	6472	0.16
Latur	24,54,196	2006984	81.78	367664	14.98	66535	2.71	6387	0.26	2387	0.09	935	0.05	310	0.01	2994	0.12
Mumbai	30,85,411	1873762	60.73	773173	25.06	134257	4.35	166000	5.38	84555	2.74	13471	0.43	9099	0.30	31094	1.01
Mumbai Suburban	93,56,962	6337132	67.73	1795788	19.19	469568	5.02	343639	3.67	322476	3.45	47288	0.51	18354	0.19	22726	0.24
Nagpur	46,53,570	3492202	75.04	390974	8.40	668050	14.35	24528	0.53	34667	0.74	20469	0.44	10499	0.24	12181	0.26
Nanded	33,61,292	2501741	74.43	471951	14.04	354189	10.54	5049	0.15	3902	0.12	13540	0.40	1273	0.03	9647	0.29
Nandurbar	16,48,295	1521618	92.31	96182	5.83	4969	0.31	6191	0.37	8467	0.51	685	0.04	2907	0.19	7276	0.44
Nashik	61,07,187	5237009	85.75	693052	11.35	94783	1.55	38212	0.62	23946	0.39	8912	0.16	1795	0.03	9478	0.15
Osmanabad	16,57,576	1437623	86.73	178925	10.79	28216	1.71	4530	0.27	942	0.06	310	0.02	195	0.01	6805	0.41
Parbhani	18,36,086	1328385	72.35	306364	16.68	187899	10.24	6238	0.34	2081	0.11	1371	0.07	262	0.01	3486	0.19
Pune	94,29,408	8090254	85.79	673704	7.14	340404	3.61	127786	1.35	134192	1.42	27090	0.29	9873	0.12	26105	0.28
Raigarh	26,34,200	2239370	85.01	227465	8.63	121791	4.62	12260	0.46	17452	0.66	7477	0.28	1159	0.07	7226	0.27
Ratnagiri	16,15,069	1307211	80.94	187197	11.59	113467	7.02	3347	0.21	1990	0.12	230	0.02	95	0.01	1532	0.09
Sangli	28,22,143	2440312	86.47	239607	8.50	38210	1.35	87453	3.10	9098	0.32	1260	0.04	769	0.03	5434	0.19
Satara	30,03,741	2691952	89.62	146970	4.89	141315	4.70	12810	0.43	4408	0.15	1182	0.04	676	0.02	4428	0.15
Sindhudurg	8,49,651	780384	91.85	26264	3.36	24762	2.91	1046	0.12	15471	1.82	219	0.01	53	~	1452	0.17
Solapur	43,17,756	3795424	87.90	441254	10.22	35497	0.82	28134	0.65	9882	0.23	1279	0.03	568	0.02	5718	0.13
Thane	1,10,60,148	8716055	78.81	1355630	12.26	449617	4.06	172052	1.56	280700	2.54	39149	0.35	9862	0.09	37083	0.33
Wardha	13,00,774	1057096	81.27	53854	4.14	175417	13.48	5663	0.43	2696	0.21	2147	0.16	1657	0.14	2254	0.17
Washim	11,97,160	859949	71.83	142672	11.92	179330	14.98	8476	0.71	1707	0.15	518	0.04	381	0.03	4127	0.34
Yavatmal	27,72,348	2251401	81.21	239236	8.63	249874	9.01	11422	0.41	4567	0.16	1596	0.05	3745	0.14	10507	0.38

== Hinduism ==
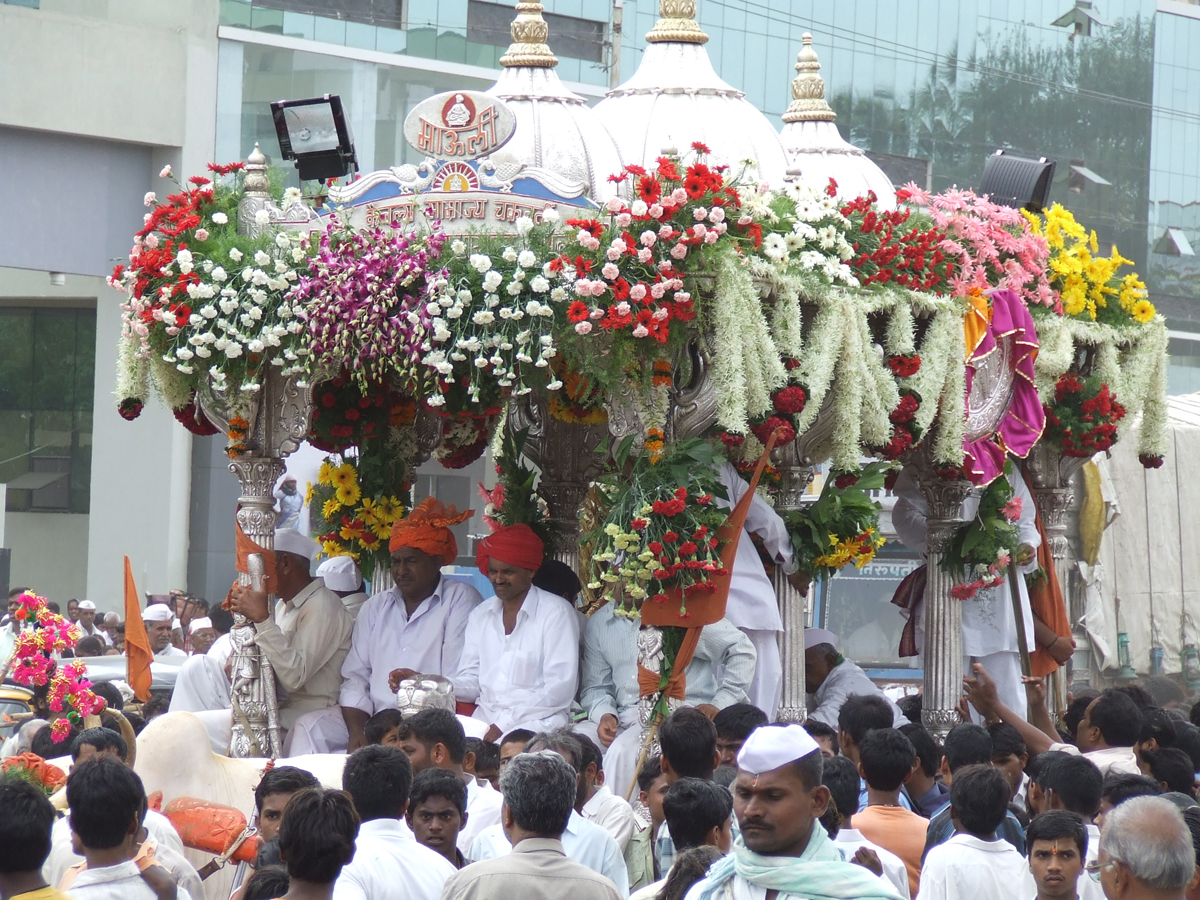
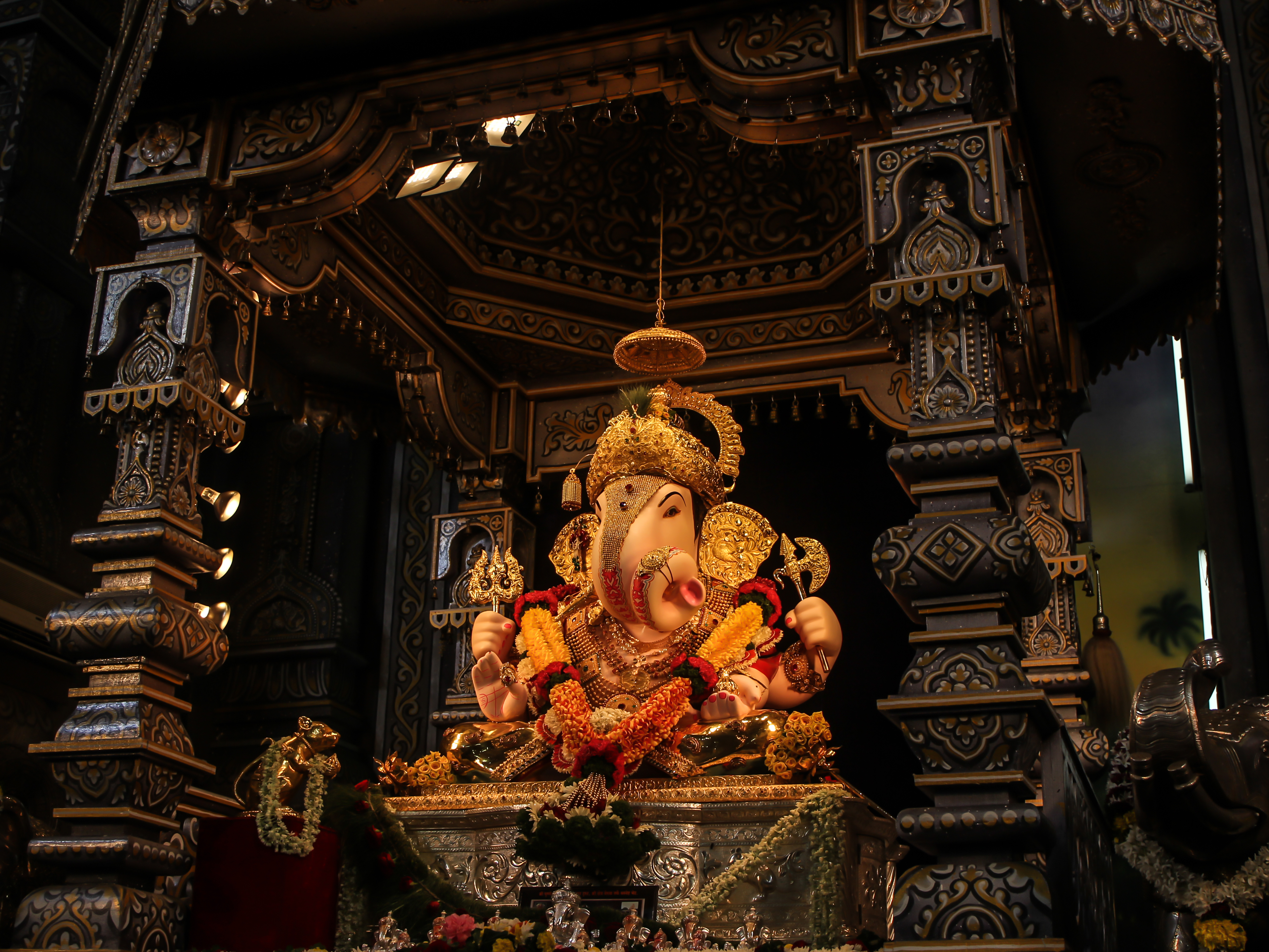
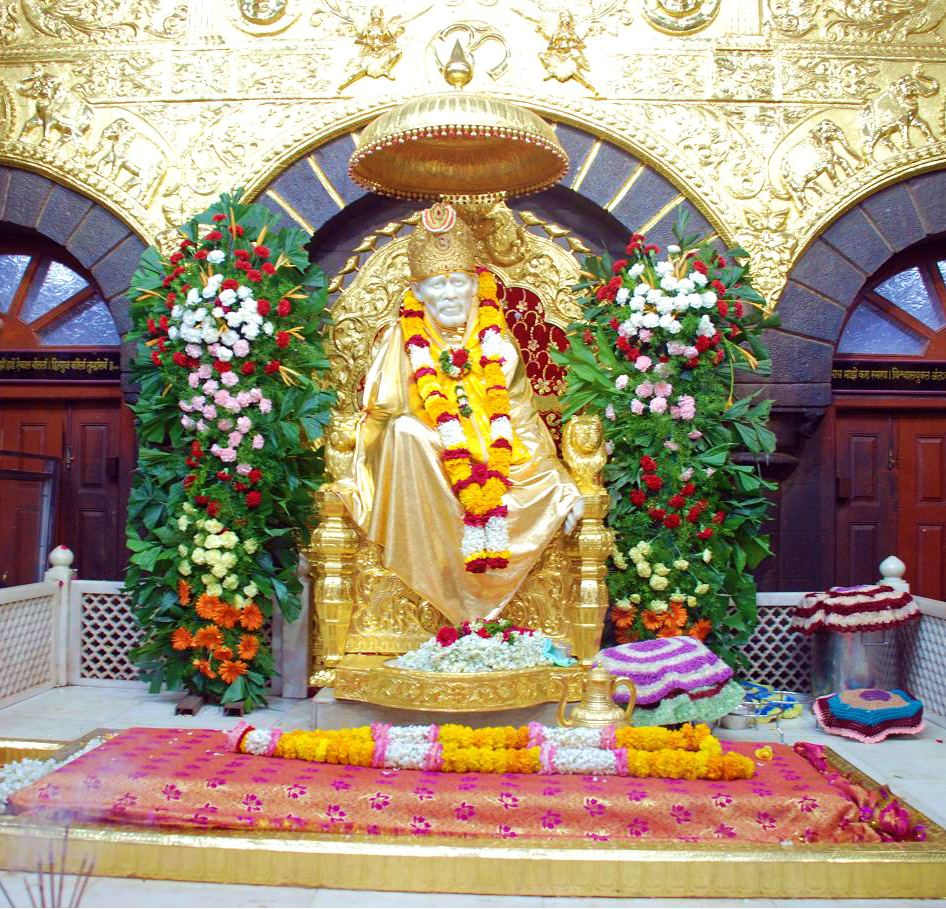
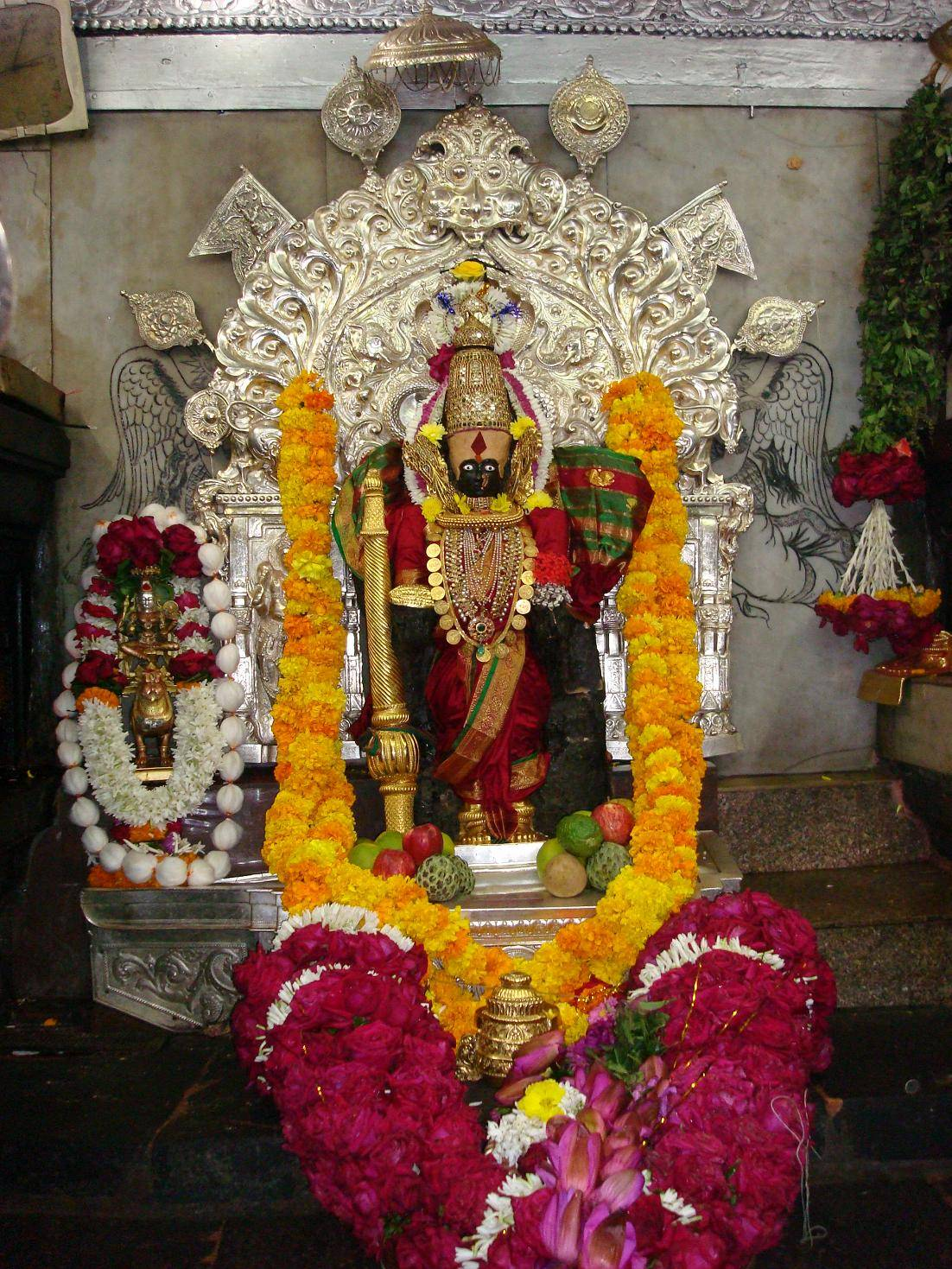
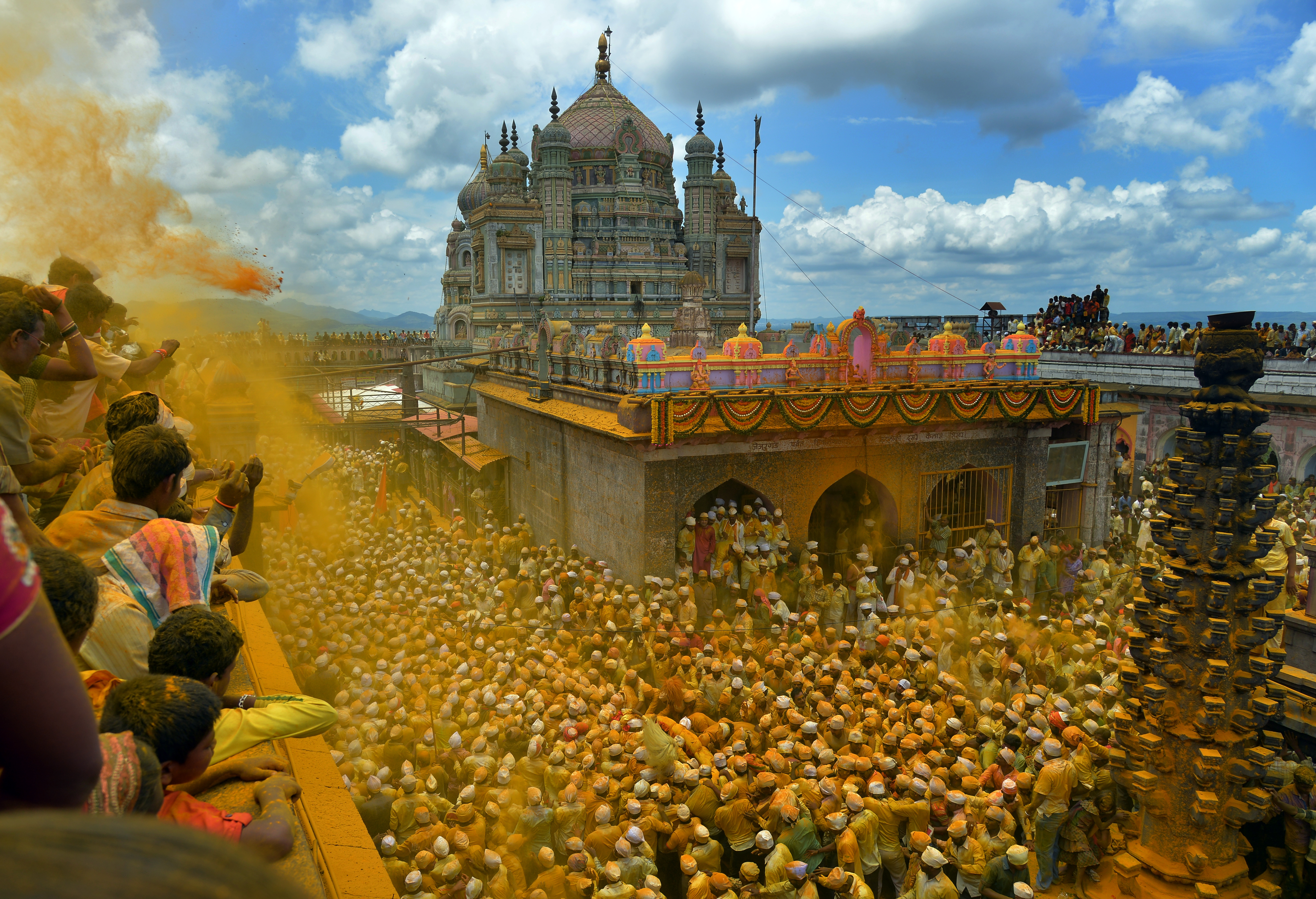
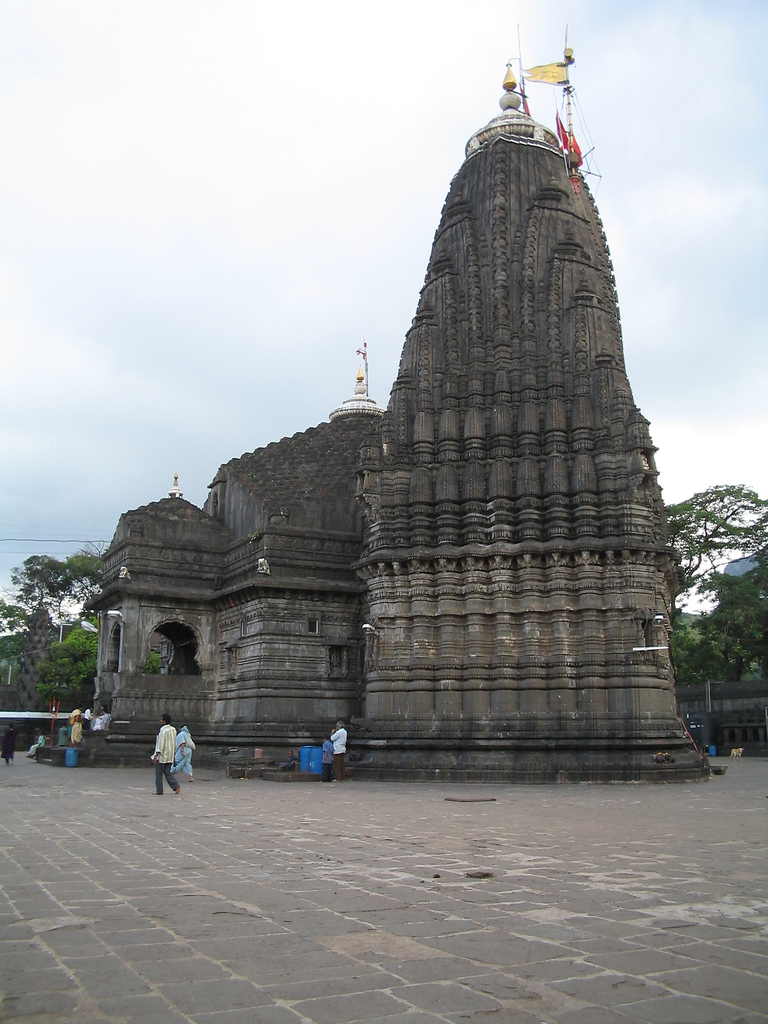
Varkari saint Dnyaneshwar's palkhi (palanquin), Dagdusheth Ganpati, Pune, Sai baba of Shirdi, Mahalaxmi of Kolhapur, Khandoba temple Jejuri, Trimbakeshwar Jyotirlinga Temple

Hindus form 79.83% of the state's total population as per 2011 census and Hinduism plays an important role in the lives of the Maharashtrian people in their day-to-day life. Ganesha, incarnations of Vishnu such as Vitthala, Rama, Krishna and Dattatreya, as well as Hanuman, Shiva and Parvati are popular with Hindus of Maharashtra. Shiva is worshipped mainly in the form of lingam, with a metal mask covering it at some temples. The Warkari tradition holds a strong grip on the local Hindus of Maharashtra. The public Ganesha festival started by Bal Gangadhar Tilak in the late 19th century is very popular. Marathi Hindus also revere Bhakti saints associated with varkari sects such as Dnyaneshwar, Savata Mali, Tukaram, Namdev, Janabaii and Chokhamela. Many religious figures from 19th and 20th century are revered.They include Swami Samarth, Gajanan Maharaj, Sai baba of Shirdi, Tukdoji Maharaj, Gondavalekar Maharaj, and Gadge Maharaj.

Maharashtra has significant Hindu populations with origins in other states and regions of India, which adds to the diversity of temples and traditions in the state. The state has numerous recently built temples by groups such as the Swaminarayan sect, ISKCON, and South Indian communities.

=== Ceremonies, rituals, and festivals ===
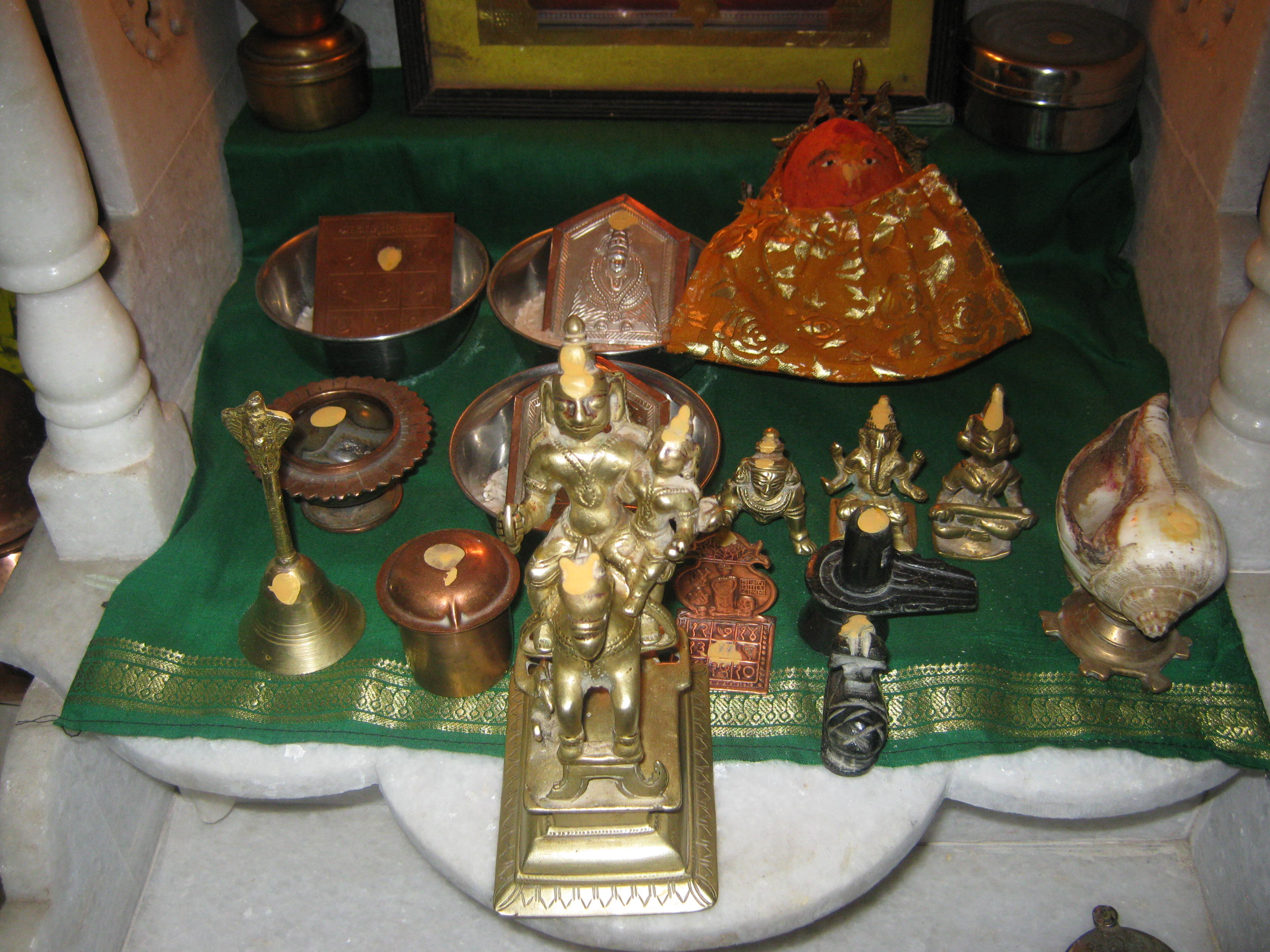
A Marathi household shrine with Khandoba at the forefront. (Note: Going clockwise from the statue of Khandoba, a copper container with Gangajal or water from the River Ganges, bell used during Hindu rituals, oil lamp, Copper plate bearing images of the Eight Ganesh idols or Ashtavinayak, a metal plate of a Goddess, Lead oxide coated image of Goddess Renuka, conch shell or Shankh, Goddess Annapurna, Ganesh, crawling BalKrishna, or baby Krishna, black Shivling, black sandals representing a saint revered by the family)

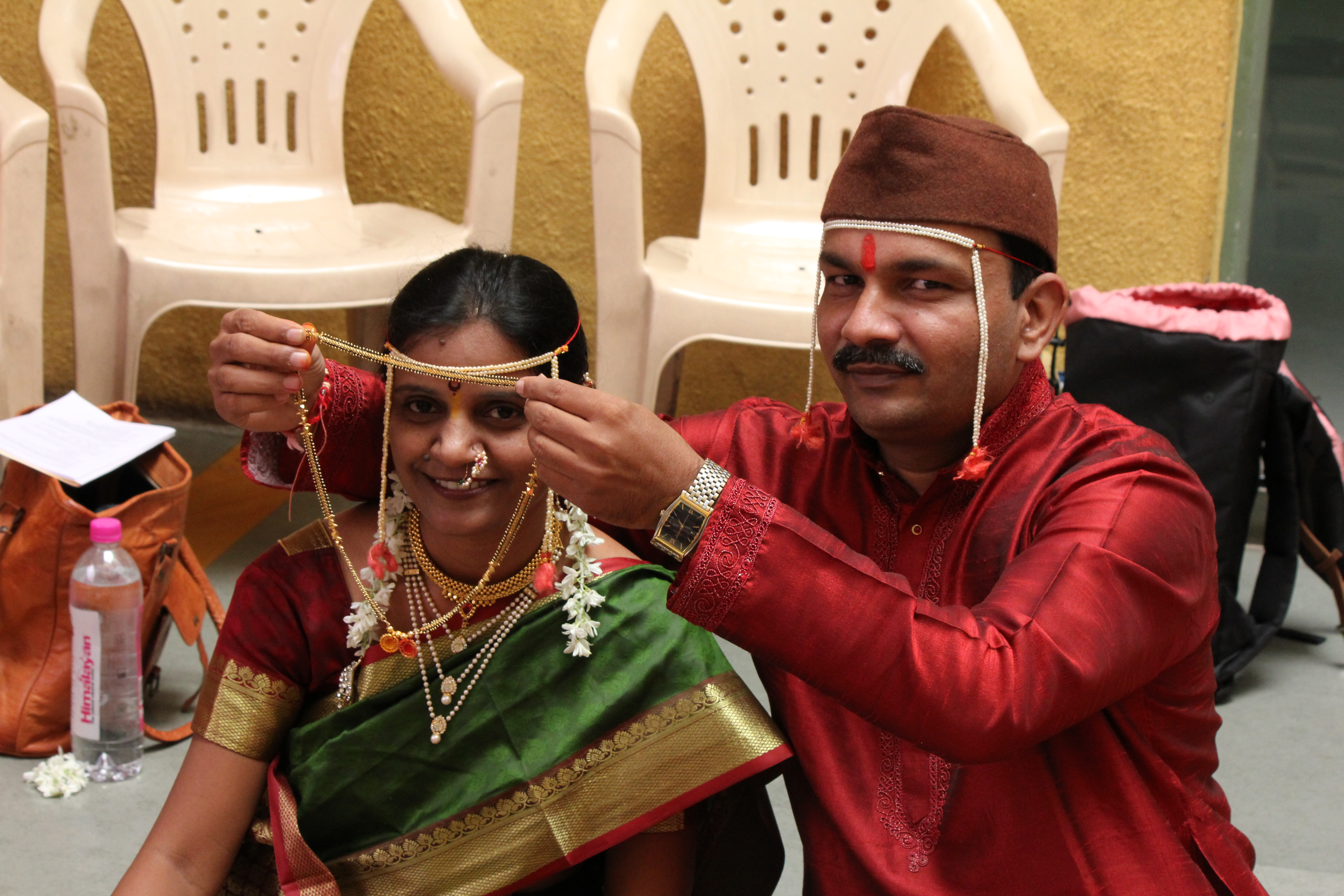
A groom tying a mangalasutra during their wedding ceremony

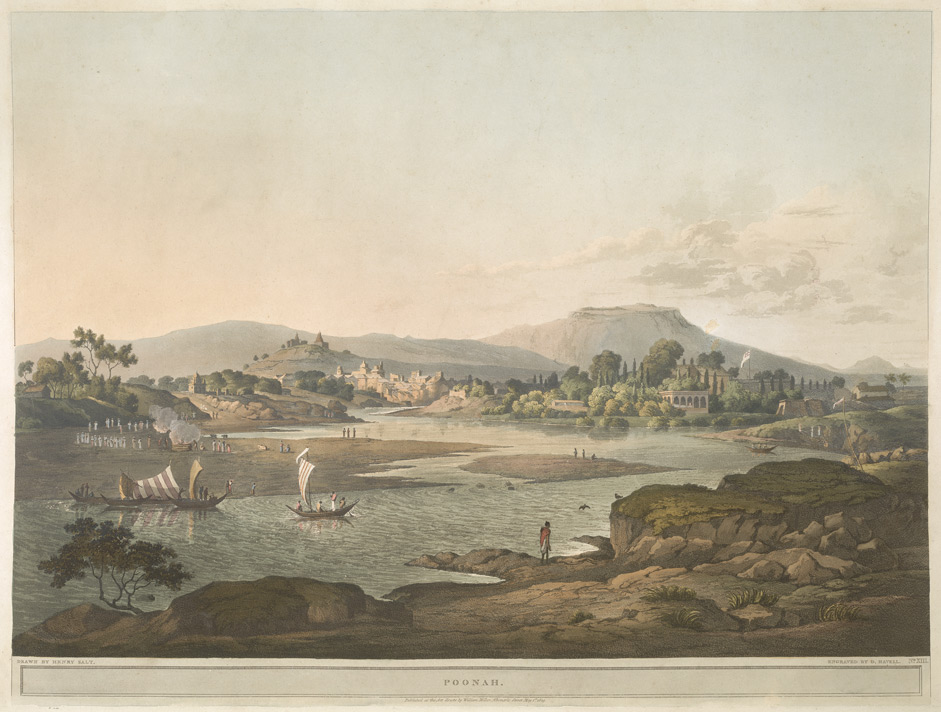
An old painting depicting Hindu cremation and death rituals at the confluence of two rivers in Pune

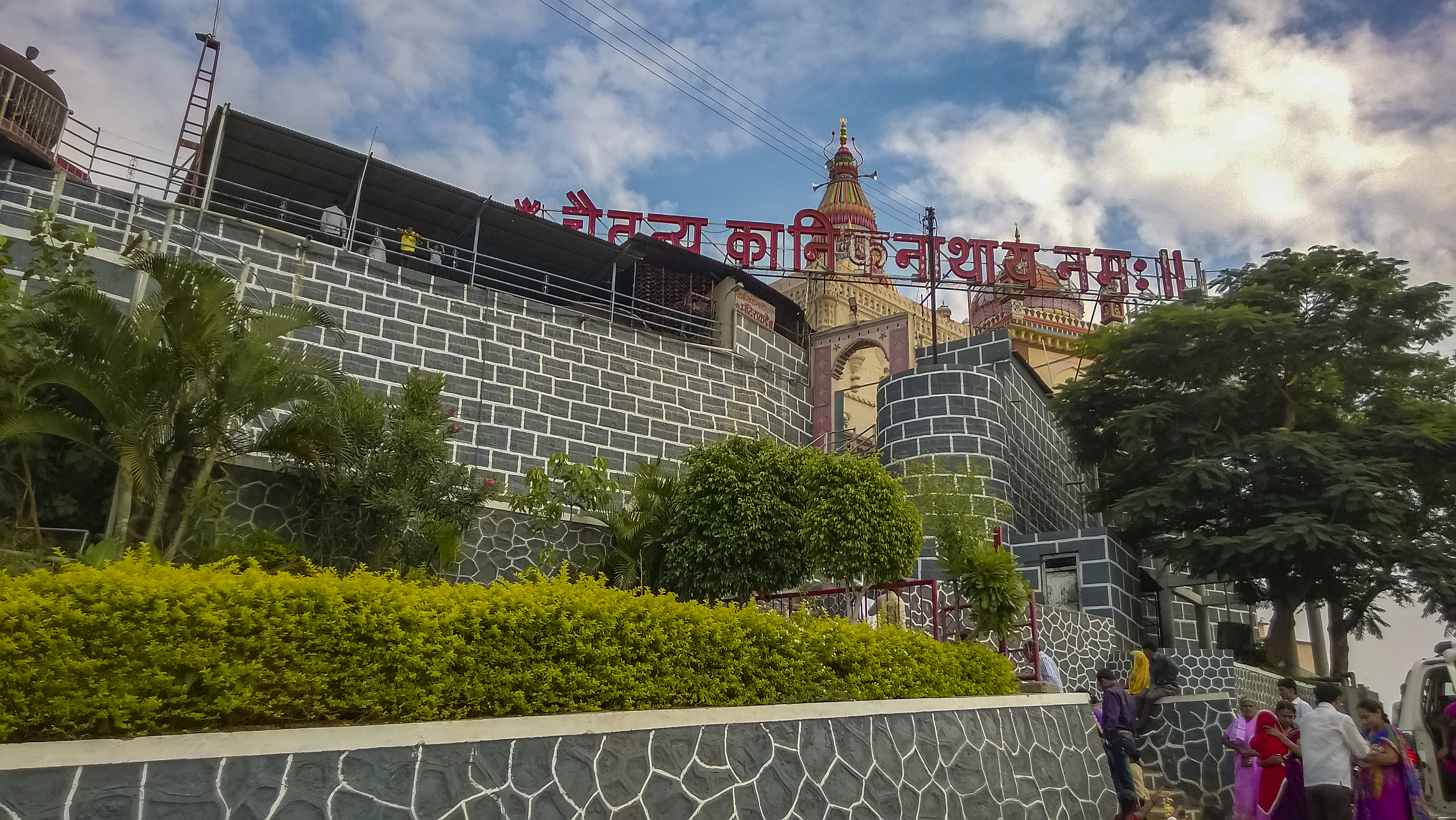
Kanifnath temple at Madhi

The main life ceremonies in Hindu culture include those related to birth, weddings, initiation ceremonies, as well as death rituals. Other ceremonies for different occasions in Hindu life include Vastushanti and "Satyanarayan" which is performed before a family formally establishes residence in a new house. Satyanarayana Puja is a ceremony performed before commencing any new endeavour or for no particular reason. Invoking the name of the family's gotra and the kuladevata are important aspects of these ceremonies for many communities.

Like most other Hindu communities, the Marathi people have a household shrine called a devaghar with idols, symbols, and pictures of various deities for daily worship. Ritual reading of religious texts known as pothi is also popular in some communities.

In some traditional families, food is first offered to the preferred deity in the household shrine, as naivedya, before being consumed by family members and guests. Meals or snacks are not taken before this religious offering. In present times, the naivedya is offered by families only on days of special religious significance.

Many Marathi people trace their paternal ancestors to one of the seven or eight sages, the saptarshi. They classify themselves as gotras, named after the ancestor rishi. Intra-marriage within gotras (Sagotra Vivaha) was uncommon until recently, being discouraged as it was likened to incest.

Most Marathi families have their own family patron or protective deity or the Kuladevata. This deity is common to a lineage or a clan of several families who are connected to each other through a common ancestor. The Khandoba of Jejuri is an example of a Kuladaivat of some families; he is a common Kuladaivat to several castes ranging from Brahmins to Dalits. The practice of worshiping local or territorial deities as Kuladaivats began in the period of the Yadava dynasty. Other family deities of the people of Maharashtra are Bhavani of Tuljapur, Mahalaxmi of Kolhapur, Mahalaxmi of Amravati, Renuka of Mahur, Parashurama in Konkan, Saptashringi on Saptashringa hill at Vani in Nasik district, and Balaji.

At birth, a child is initiated into the family ritually. The child's naming ceremony may happen many weeks or even months later, and it is called the barsa. During the naming ceremony, the child's paternal aunt has the honor of naming the infant. When the child is 11 months old, they get their first hair-cut. This is also an important ritual and is called Jawal. In the Maratha community, the maternal uncle is given the honour of the first snip during the ceremony.

In Brahman, CKP and Gaud Saraswat Brahman communities when a male child reaches his eighth birthday, he undergoes the initiation thread ceremony variously known as Munja Vratabandha, or Upanayanam. 96 kuli marathas generally conduct the Upanayanam ceremony before marriage.

Marathi Hindu people are historically endogamous within their caste but exogamous with their clan (gotra). Cross-cousin alliances are allowed by most Marathi Hindu communities. Hindu marriages, take place by negotiation.Studies show that most Indians' traditional views on caste, religion, and family background have remained unchanged when it came to marriage, that is, people marry within their own castes, and matrimonial advertisements in newspapers are still classified by caste and sub-caste.

Elements of a traditional Marathi Hindu wedding ceremony include seemant poojan on the wedding eve. The dharmic wedding includes the antarpat ceremony followed by the vedic ceremony which involves the bridegroom and the bride walking around the sacred fire seven times to complete the marriage. Modern urban wedding ceremonies conclude with an evening reception. A Marathi Hindu woman becomes part of her husband's family after marriage and adopts the gotra as well as the traditions of her husband's family. After weddings and after thread ceremonies, many Maratha and Deshastha Brahmin families arrange a traditional religious singing performance by a Gondali group. Women from Hindu community are given a necklace called mangalasutra during the wedding ceremony by the groom. This is worn as a symbol of marriage by women throughout their married life.

Marathi Hindu people dispose their dead by cremation. The ashes are gathered in an earthen pitcher and immersed in a river on the third day after death. This is a 13-day ritual with the pinda being offered to the dead soul on the 11th and a Śrāddha ceremony followed by a funeral feast on the 13th. Cremation is performed according to vedic rites, usually within a day of the individual's death. Śrāddha becomes an annual ritual in which all forefathers of the family who have passed on are remembered.

Hindu Marathi people celebrate several festivals during the year. These include Gudi Padwa, Rama Navami, Hanuman Jayanti, Narali Pournima, Mangala Gaur, Navaratri, Janmashtami, Ganeshotsav, Kojagiri, Diwali, Khandoba Festival (Champa Shashthi), Makar Sankranti, Shivaratri, Holi, Raksha Bandhan and Shiv Jayanti. Most villages in Maharashtra also have a Jatra or Urus in honor of the village deity. Most of these festivals are also celebrated by Hindu communities in the state who have origins in other regions of India.

=== Syncretic traditions ===
Maharashtra has shrines dedicated to saints and holy men all over the state that are revered by both Hindus and Muslims. The Naunaths of Hindus have counterparts among Muslims too. The shrine of Kanifnath is visited by both Hindus and Muslims. In modern times, Sai Baba of Shirdi has embodied this syncretic tradition.

== Islam ==
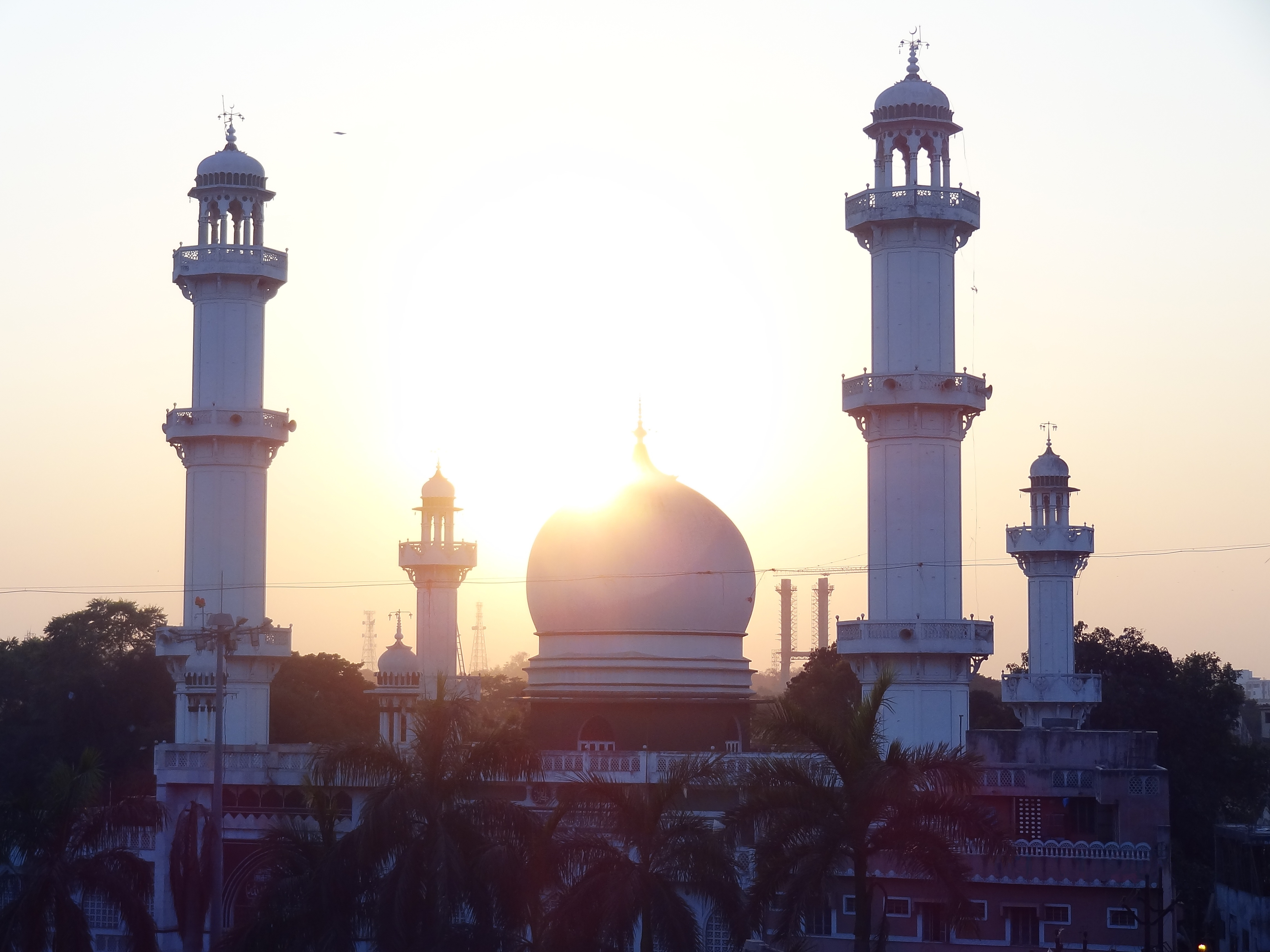
Jama Masjid in Nagpur

Islam is the second largest religion in the state, with 12,967,840 adherents comprising 11.54% of the population, per estimates. The Muslim population in the state is heterogeneous. The majority of Muslims are mostly Sunni Muslims and Shia Muslims. There are also regional differences with the Konkani Muslim community having a distinct character because of their history. For millennia, the Konkan coast has had mercantile relations with major ports on the Red Sea and Persian Gulf. Konkani Muslims can trace their ancestry to Arab traders who visited the konkan coast in the medieval era Konkani Muslims also follow the Shafi'i school of Sunni Islamic law. This is in contrast to the rest of North India and Deccan regions whose Sunni Muslims adhere to the Hanafi school.

The population in the state is highly urbanised, and spread across different regions. The urban character of the community in Maharashtra can be seen from the fact that Mumbai, the capital city of Maharashtra, is approximately 18.8% Muslim per the Census. Mumbai, the capital city of the state, has approximately over 3 million Muslims, and the Muslim population of Mumbai is the city with a large Muslim population among any city outside Muslim-majority countries. The Haji Ali Dargah in Mumbai which is situated on an island is a famous islamic shrine in Maharashtra. Similarly, Nagpur, the second capital of Maharashtra, has population that is 11% Muslim. Marathwada region which formerly was part of Nizam ruled Hyderabad state has much higher muslim population than other parts of the state. In the Marathwada city of Aurangabad, Muslims form 30.79% of the population, while in the northern city of Malegaon, Muslims are 79% of the population. The headquarters of Gujarati speaking Bohra Shia Muslim community is located in Mumbai.

Eid-ul-Fitr (Ramzan Eid) and Eid-ul-Azha (Bakari Eid) are the two most important Muslim festivals in the state. Visiting the tombs (Dargah) of Sufi saints is an important part of cultural and religious life of Muslims in Maharashtra. The annual death anniversary of the saints is celebrated with fairs (Urs) that attracts thousands of visitors.

== Buddhism ==
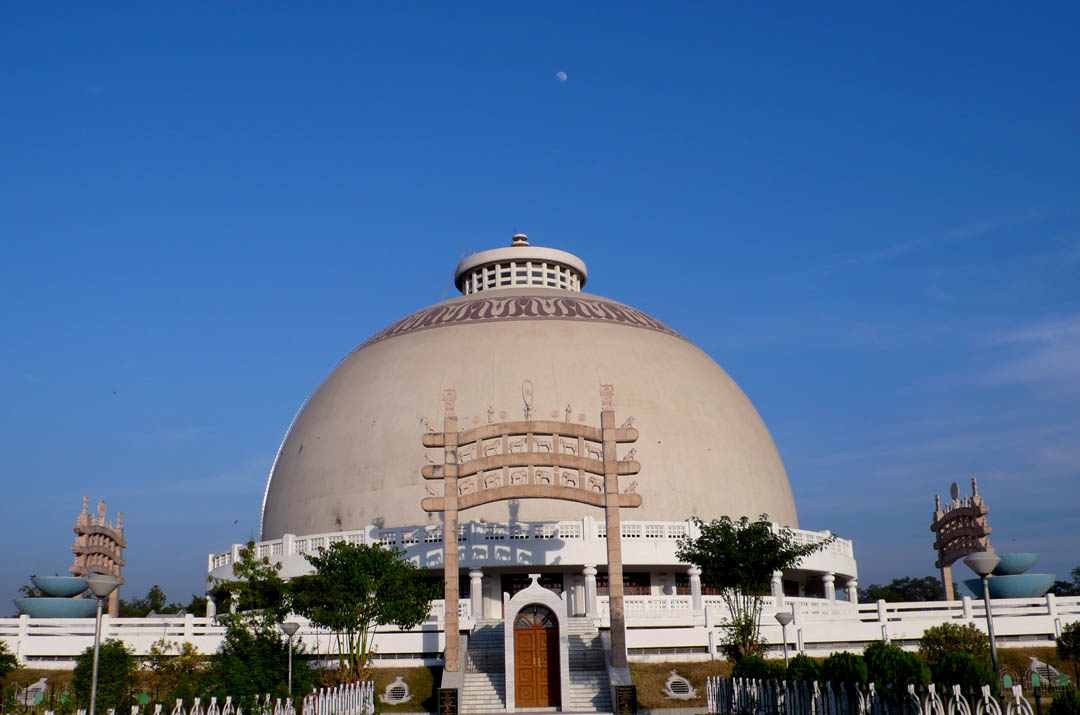
Deekshabhoomi is a major centre of the Dalit Buddhist movement in Maharashtra

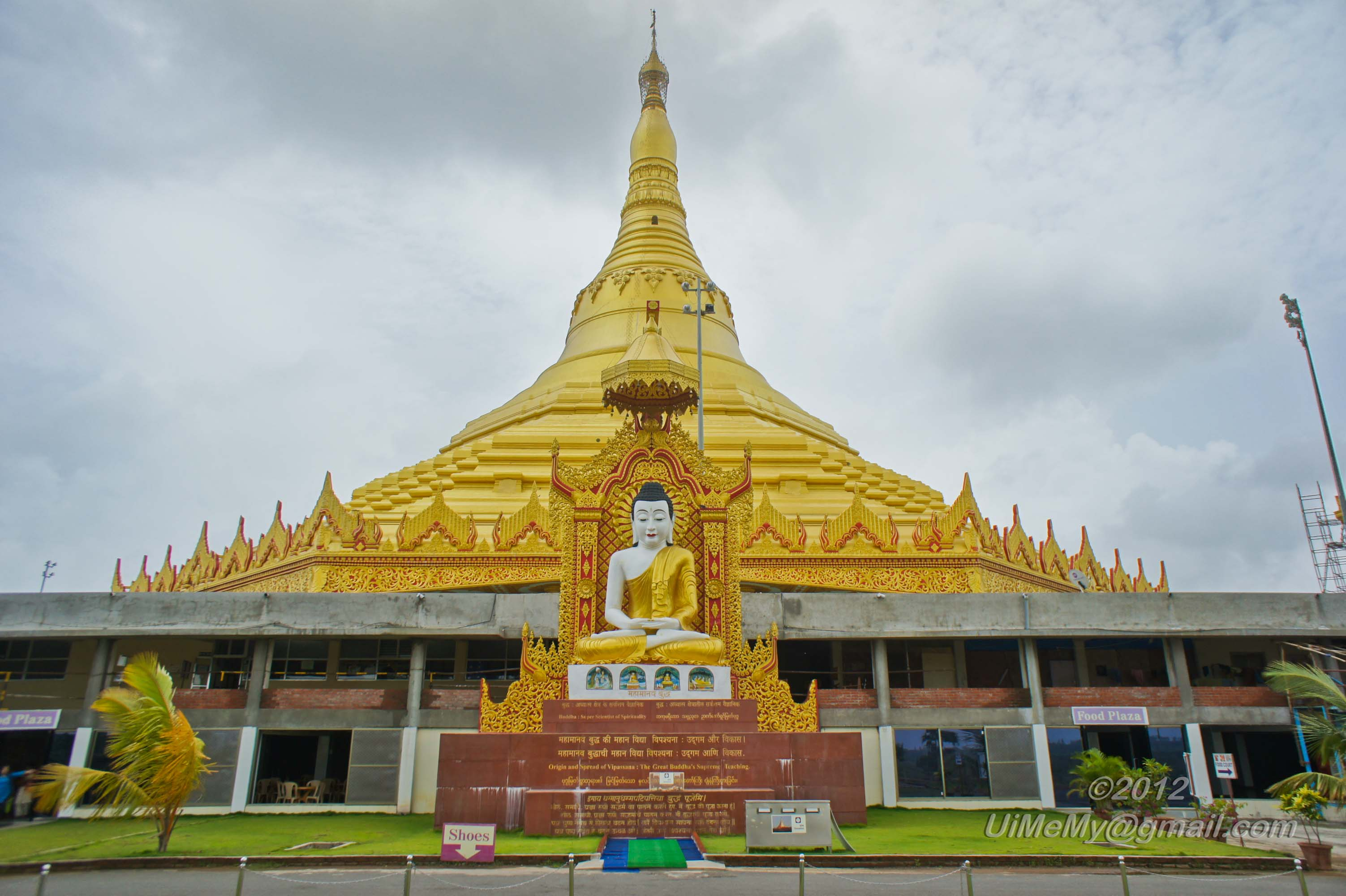
Global Vipassana Pagoda, Mumbai Buddhism percent in Maharashtra by district, 2011 census

Buddhism is the third largest religion in the state. Buddhism accounts 5.81% in Maharashtra's total population. 6,531,200 people are followers of Buddhism in Maharashtra as per 2011 census. Maharashtra account for 77.36% of all Buddhists in India. Marathi Buddhists are followers of Navayana Buddhism of the Dalit Buddhist movement, a 20th-century Buddhist revival movement in India that received its most substantial impetus from Babasaheb Ambedkar born in Hindu Mahar family who called for the conversion of Dalits to Buddhism in order to liberate themselves from the caste-based society that have been harshly treated them in the hierarchy. Dhammachakra Pravartan Din or Dhamma Wheel's Promulgation Day is also widely celebrated by the local Buddhist community for the Buddhist conversion of B. R. Ambedkar and his approximately 600,000 followers on 14 October 1956 at Deekshabhoomi, Nagpur.

== Jainism ==
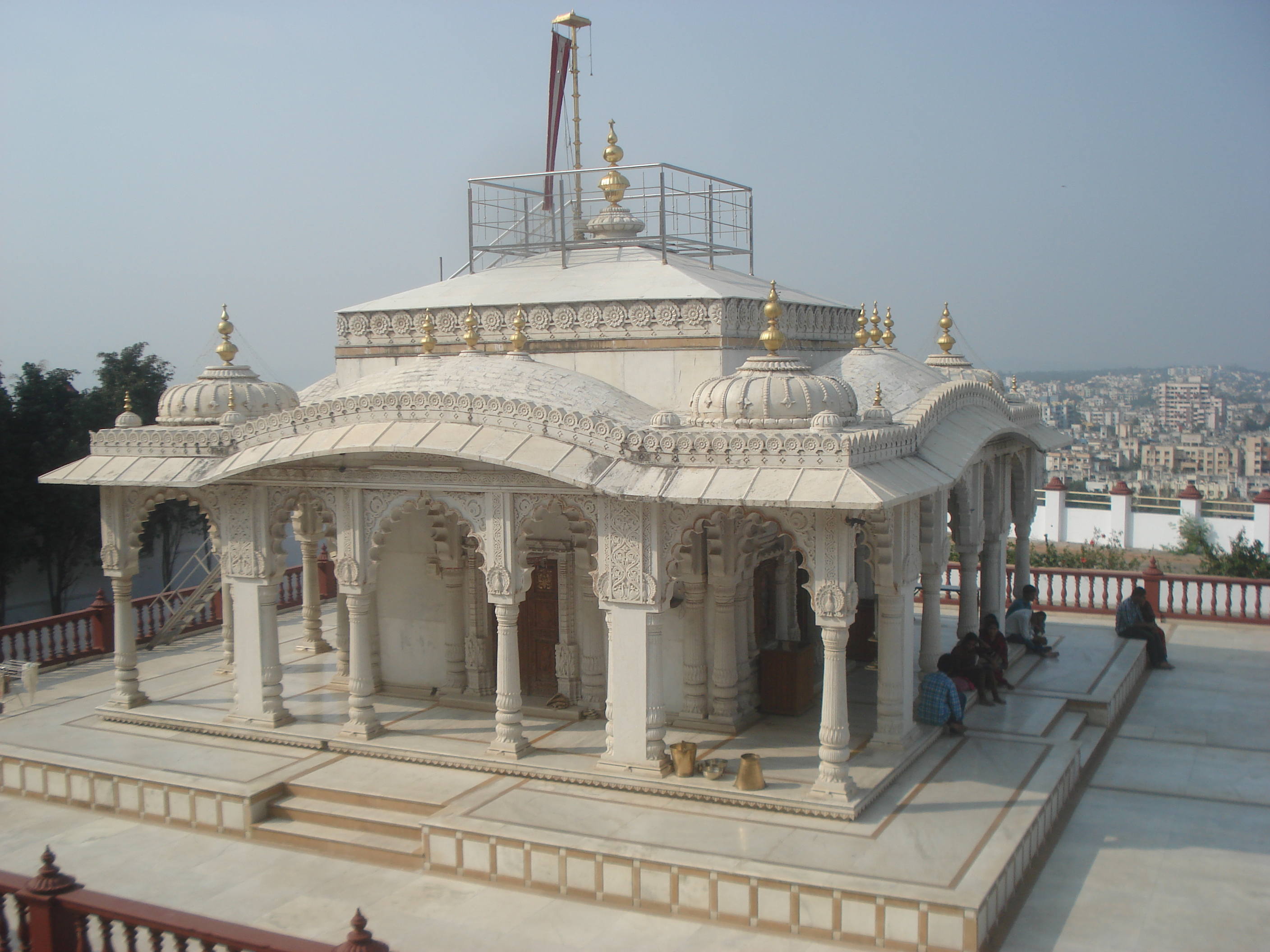
Jain Pavapuri Jal Mandir, Pune

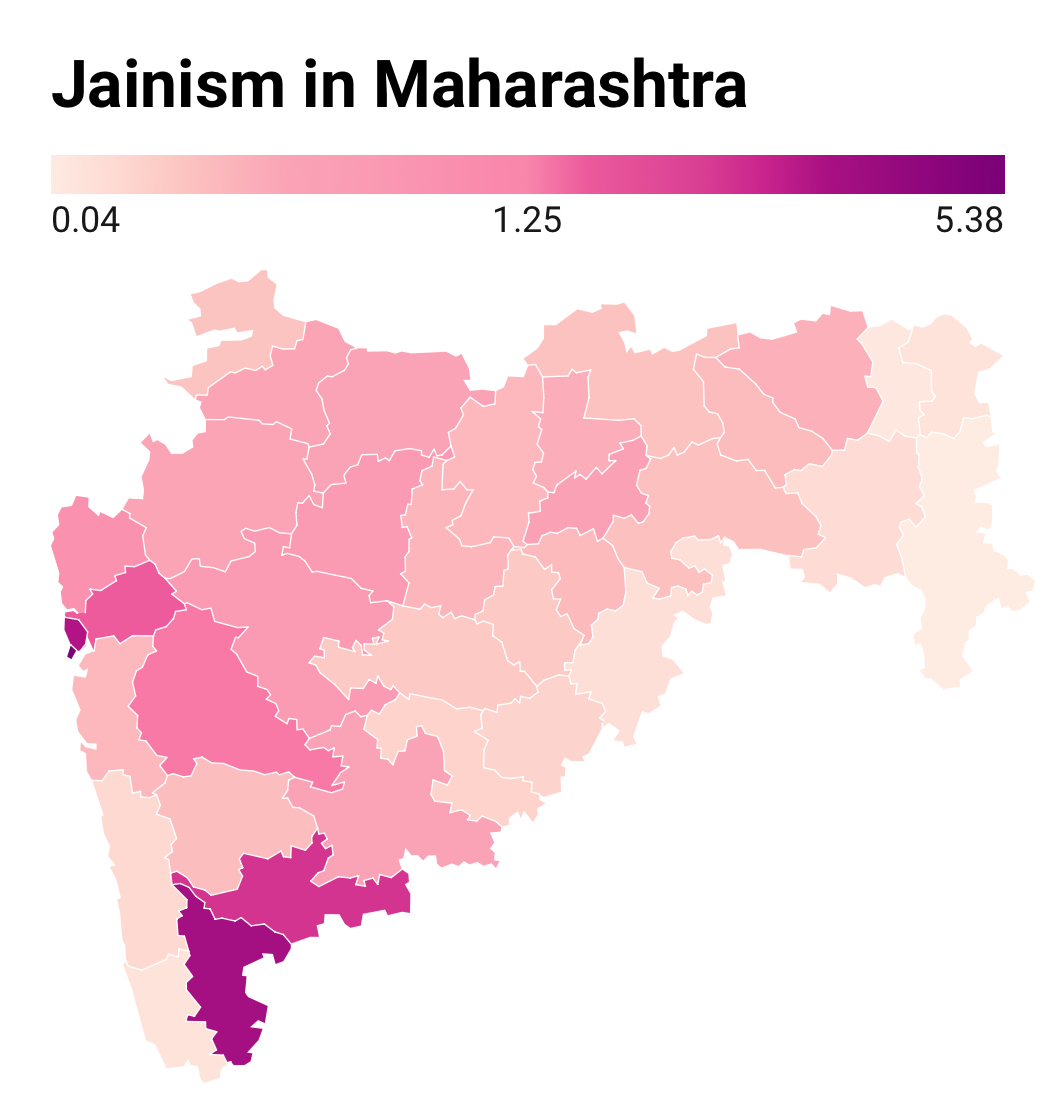
Jainism percent in Maharashtra by district, 2011 census

Jains are a major group in Maharashtra. Jain community census for 2011 in Maharashtra area was 1,400,349 (1.25%). They are mostly concentrated in the urban cities in Western Maharashtra.

The vast majority of Jains in Maharashtra originate from the Marwad and Mewad regions of Rajasthan and from the state of Gujarat. There are also indigenous Marathi Jain communities such as Saitwal, Chaturtha, Panchama & Kumbhoja found in Maharashtra. Rulers of Maharashtra from the 1st millennium CE such as Rashtrakuta and the Chalukya were followers of Jain religion. Along with Hindu and Buddhist caves, there are a number of Jain caves at the ancient cave complex of Ellora.

== Christianity ==
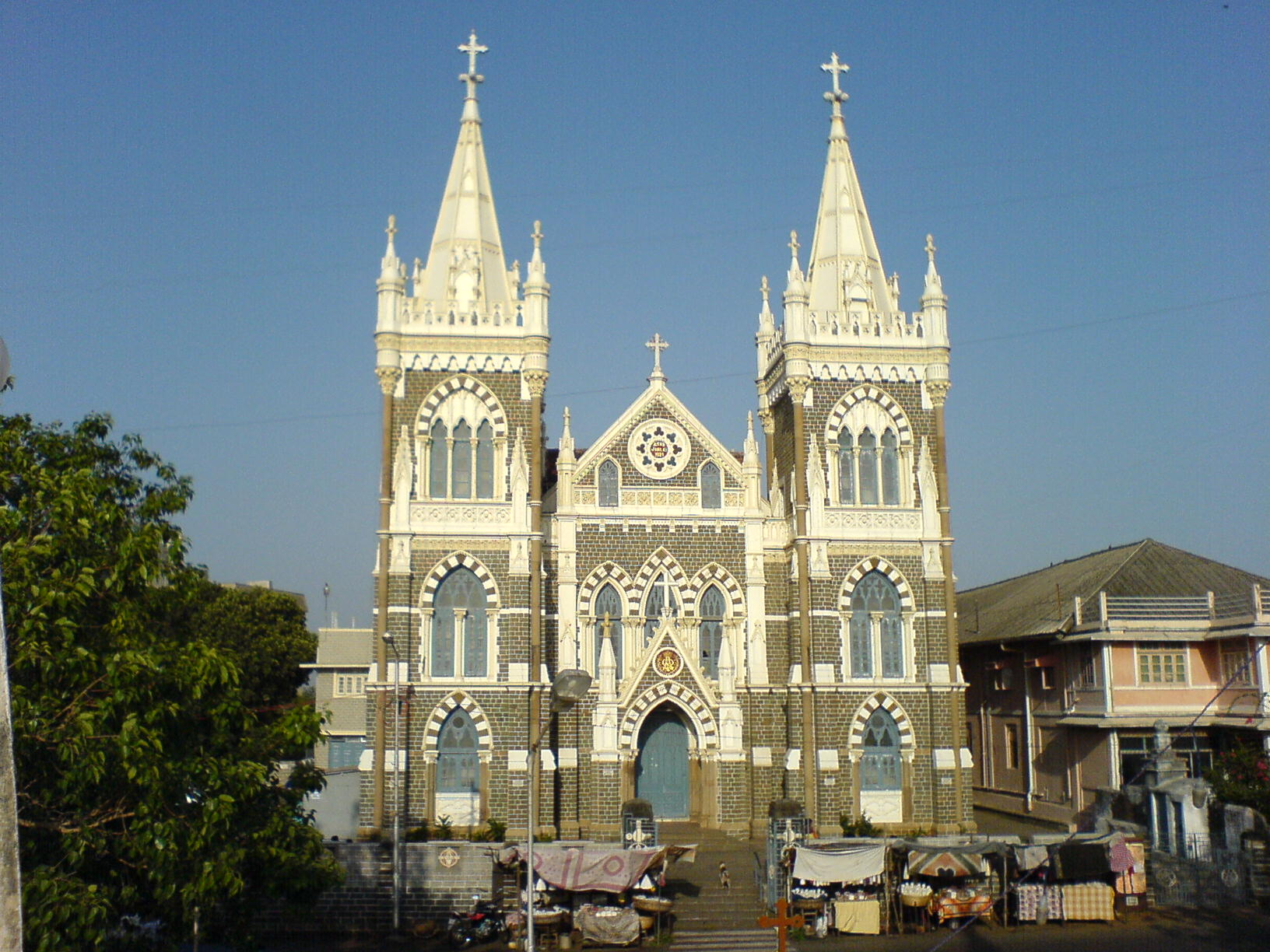
Mount Mary Church, Bandra This catholic church is well known for the Annual Feast,

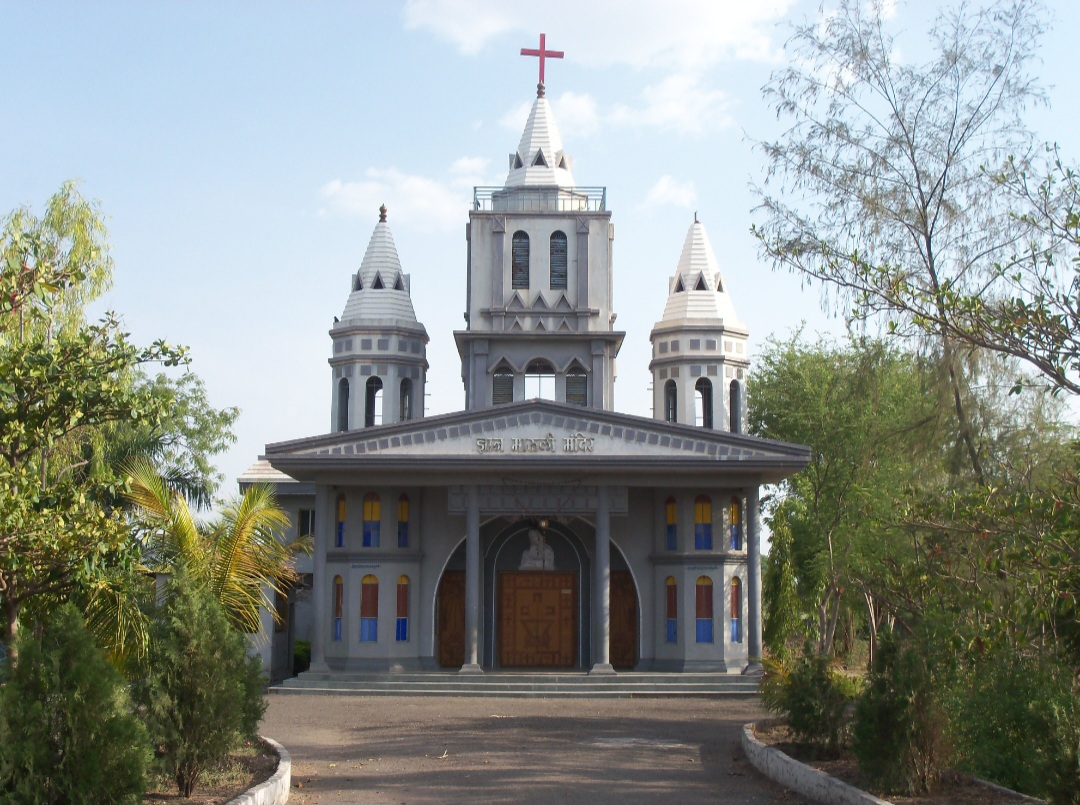
Protestant church in the town of Nevasa in Maharashtra

Christians account for 1,080,073 or 0.96% of Maharashtra's population. Most of the Christians are Catholics and Protestants. There are also Goan, Mangalorean, Keralite and Tamilian Christians in the urban pockets of Mumbai and Pune. There are two ethnic Christian communities in Maharashtra:

- Bombay East Indians – Majority Catholics, concentrated in Mumbai and in the neighbouring districts of Thane and Raigad. St Bartholomew preached to the natives of this region in the 1st century AD.
- Marathi Christians – Majority Protestants found specially in Ahmednagar and Solapur. Protestantism was brought to these areas by American and Anglican missionaries during the 18th century. Marathi Christians have largely retained their pre-Christian cultural practices.
- In the early 19th century some people converted to Christianity during famine in Ahmednagar and Miraj. They converted after evangelization by American Marathi Mission, Church Mission Society and United Society for the Propagation of the Gospel by the Church of England at Ahmednagar. In Ahmednagar, Missionary travelled between villages to explain the Bible to locals. who brought these people to Christianity. However, this Christian conversion movement was overshadowed by the large-scale conversion to Buddhism of the Dalits under the leadership of B. R. Ambedkar.

== Sikhism ==
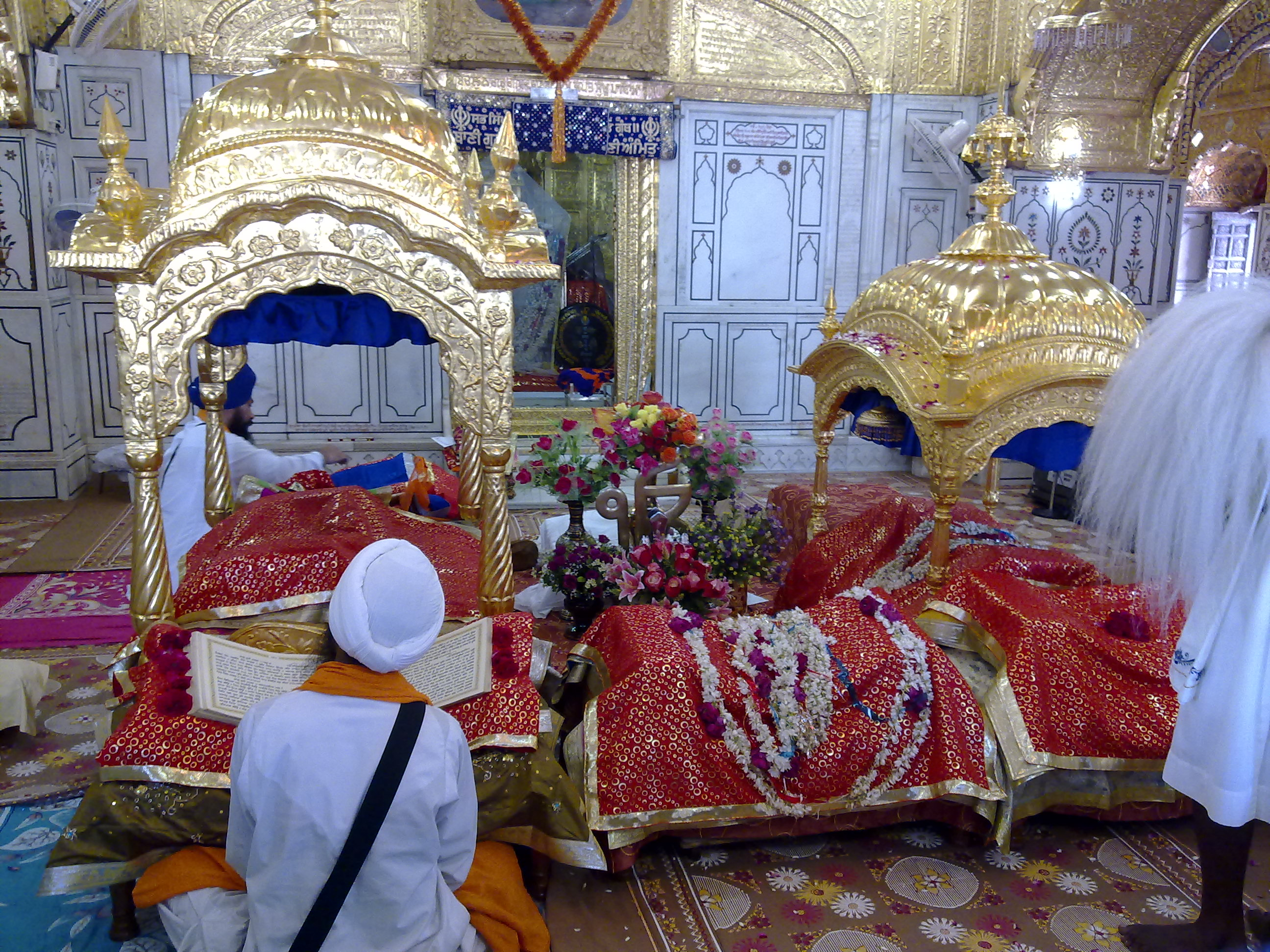
Interior view of Gurdwara Sach-Khand Hazūr Sāhib

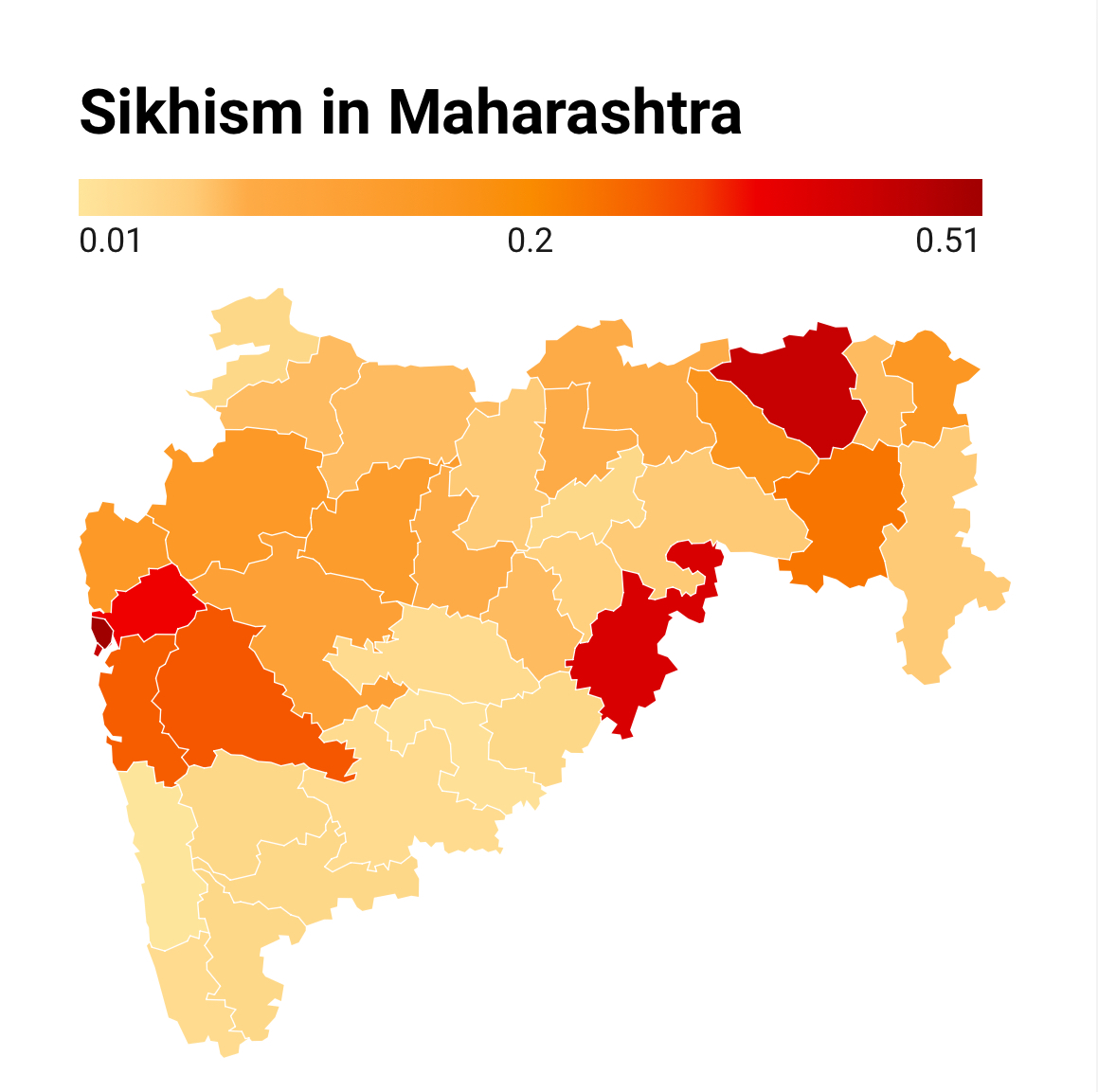
Sikhism percent in Maharashtra by district, 2011 census

There is a sizeable Sikh population in Maharashtra, with the 2011 census indicating 223,247 or 0.20% adherents. Major cities in the state such as Mumbai, Pune, Nagpur, Nashik and Aurangabad have significant Sikh populations. Nanded, the second largest city in the Marathwada region (after Aurangabad), is an important holy place for the Sikh faith and is famous for the Hazur Sahib Gurudwara. Hazūr Sāhib ("presence of the master"), also spelled Hazoor Sahib, is one of the five takhts (seats of temporal authority) in Sikhism. Located on the banks of the River Godavari, it is where the 10th Guru, Gobind Singh died. The Gurudwara within the complex is known Sach-Khand, "Realm of Truth". At a stone-throw distance from the Hazoor Sahib Gurudwara, there lies the Langar Sahib Gurudwara which is very famous for its grand Langar. In all the city has 13 major Gurudwaras with historic significance. There is a significant Sikh population in Mumbai, Pune, Nagpur, Nashik and Aurangabad.

== Zoroastrians ==
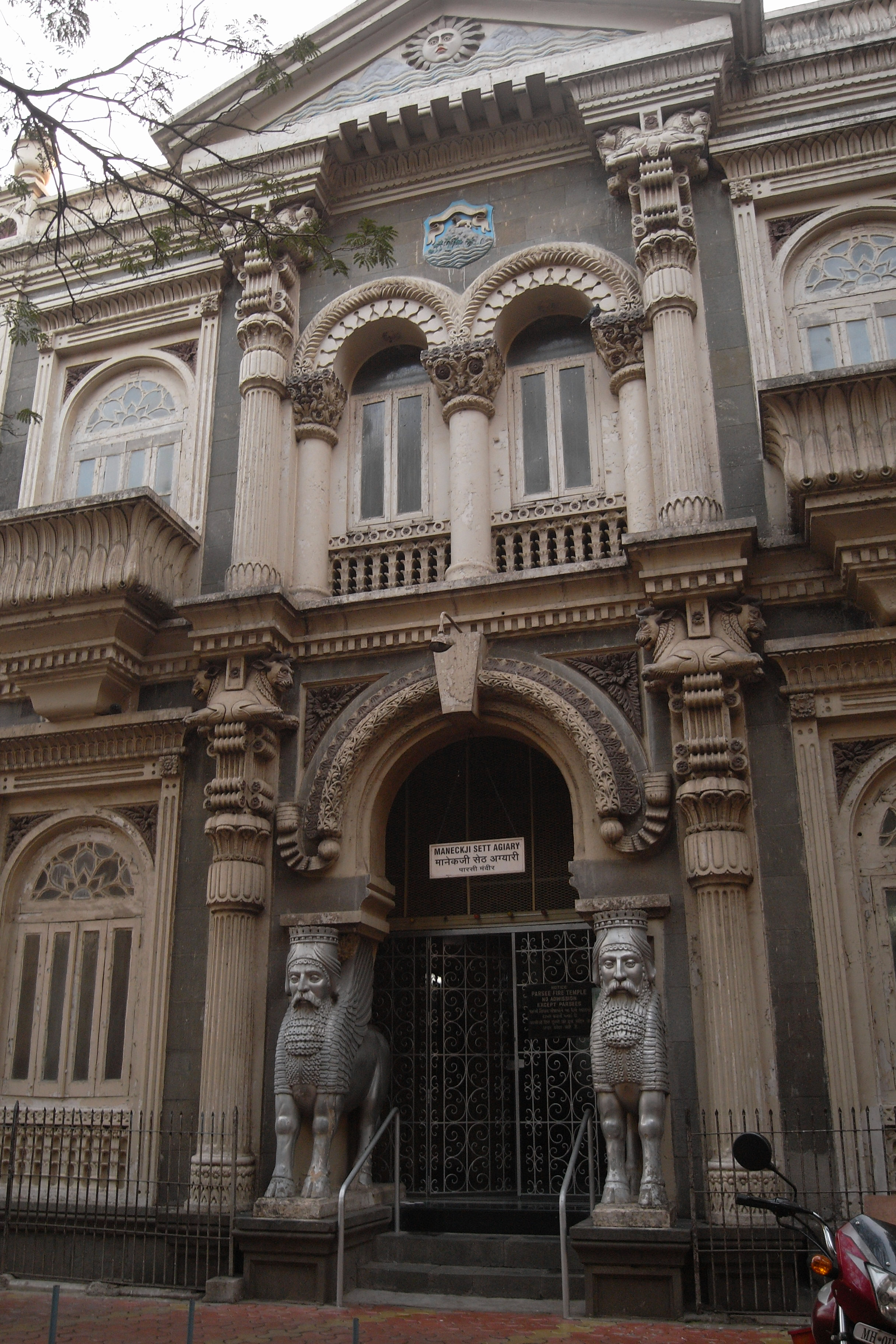
Maneckji Seth Agiary (Parsi place of worship) in Mumbai.

There are two Zoroastrian communities in Maharashtra.

- Parsis - The 2011 census found that the vast majority of the tiny Parsi community of India live in Maharashtra, mainly in Mumbai. have descended from a group of Iranian Zoroastrians who immigrated to Western India during 10th century AD.
- Iranis, are comparatively recent arrivals, and represent the smaller of the two Indian-Zoroastrian communities. Their descendants culturally and linguistically are closer to the Zoroastrians of Iran, in particular to the Zoroastrians of Yazd and Kerman. Consequently, the Dari dialect of the Zoroastrians of those provinces may also be heard amongst the Iranis.

== Judaism ==
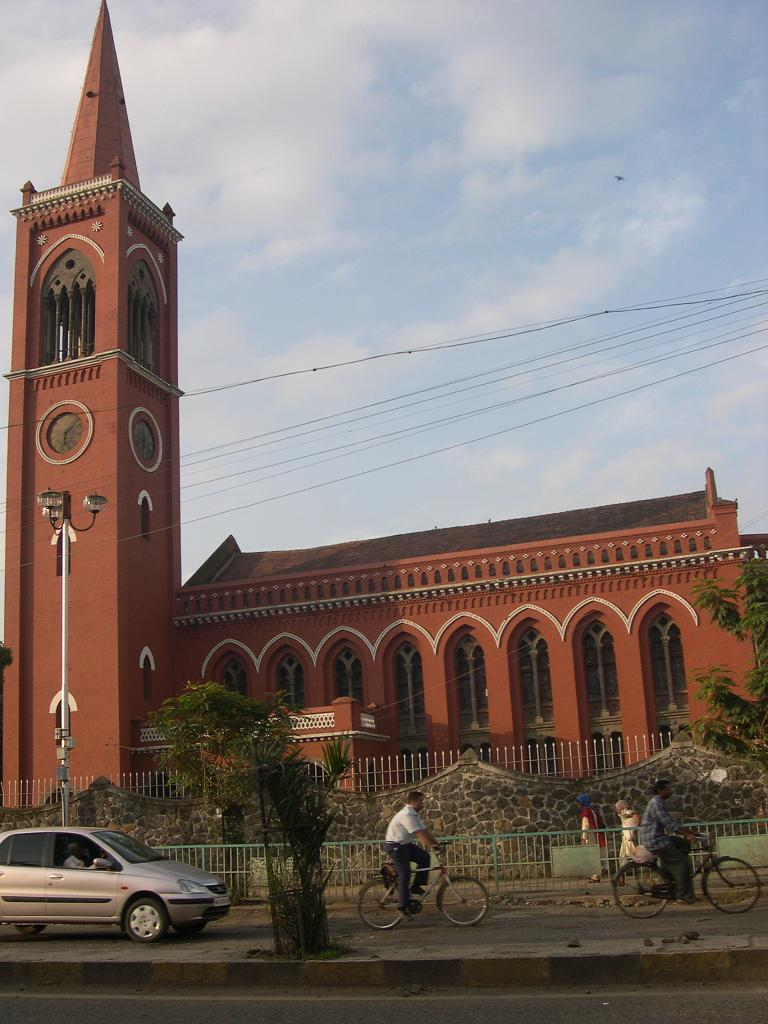
Ohel David Synagogue in Pune.

The Bene Israel ("Sons of Israel") are a community of Marathi Jews originally from villages in the Konkan region. who migrated in the late 17th century to the nearby cities, primarily Mumbai, but also to Pune, and Ahmedabad. Prior to these waves of emigrations and to this day, the Bene Israel formed the largest sector of the subcontinent's Jewish population. The native language of the Bene Israel is Marathi. Most Bene Israel have now emigrated to Israel, Canada and other Commonwealth countries. Before the Indian Independence this community numbered at least 80,000. They are given minority status by Government of Maharashtra.

== Notable places of worship ==
Maharashtra has numerous places of worship that are more than a few centuries old.

- Vithoba Temple in Pandharpur was built between 1108–1152 CE
- Tulja Bhavani Temple in Tuljapur was built in 12th Century CE
- Grishneshwar Temple was built before 13th Century CE
- Bhimashankar Temple is believed to date back to 13th Century CE
- Haji Ali Dargah was built in 1431 CE
- The Jain monuments in Ellora Caves (Caves 30–34) were built between 753-982 CE
- Jain Temple in Kumbhoj was built in 1156 CE
- Jain Temples in Mangi-Tungi are believed to date back to 595 CE
- Hazur Sahib Gurdwara in Nanded was built between 1832 and 1837
- Gate of Mercy Synagogue in Mumbai was built in 1796
- Knesset Eliyahoo Orthodox Jewish synagogue located in downtown Mumbai was built in 1884
- Magen David Synagogue (Byculla) in Mumbai was built in 1864
- Church of Our Lady of Health, Cavel in Mumbai was built in 1794
- St. Andrew's Church in Mumbai was built in 1575
- St. John the Baptist Church in Mumbai was built in 1579
- Basilica of Our Lady of the Mount, Bandra was built in the 16th century

== See also ==
- Outline of Maharashtra
- List of Maratha dynasties and states
- List of Marathi people
- Religion in India
- Demographics of Maharashtra

== Sources ==
- Zelliot, Eleanor; Berntsen, Maxine (1988), The Experience of Hinduism: essays on religion in Maharashtra, SUNY Press, ISBN 978-0-88706-664-1
