= Architecture of Maharashtra =

Architectural style of the state of Maharashtra and Maharashtrian people

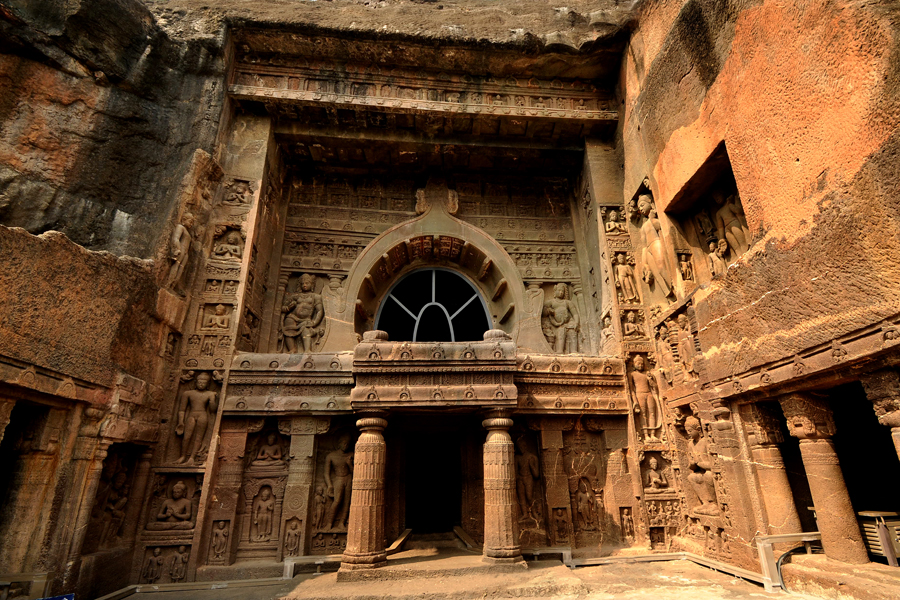
Entrance to one of the rock-cut Ajanta Caves.

Maharashtra state in India is known for its caves and cliffs. The Buddhist monks first started these caves in the 2nd century BC, in search of serene and peaceful environment for meditation, and they found these caves on the hillsides.

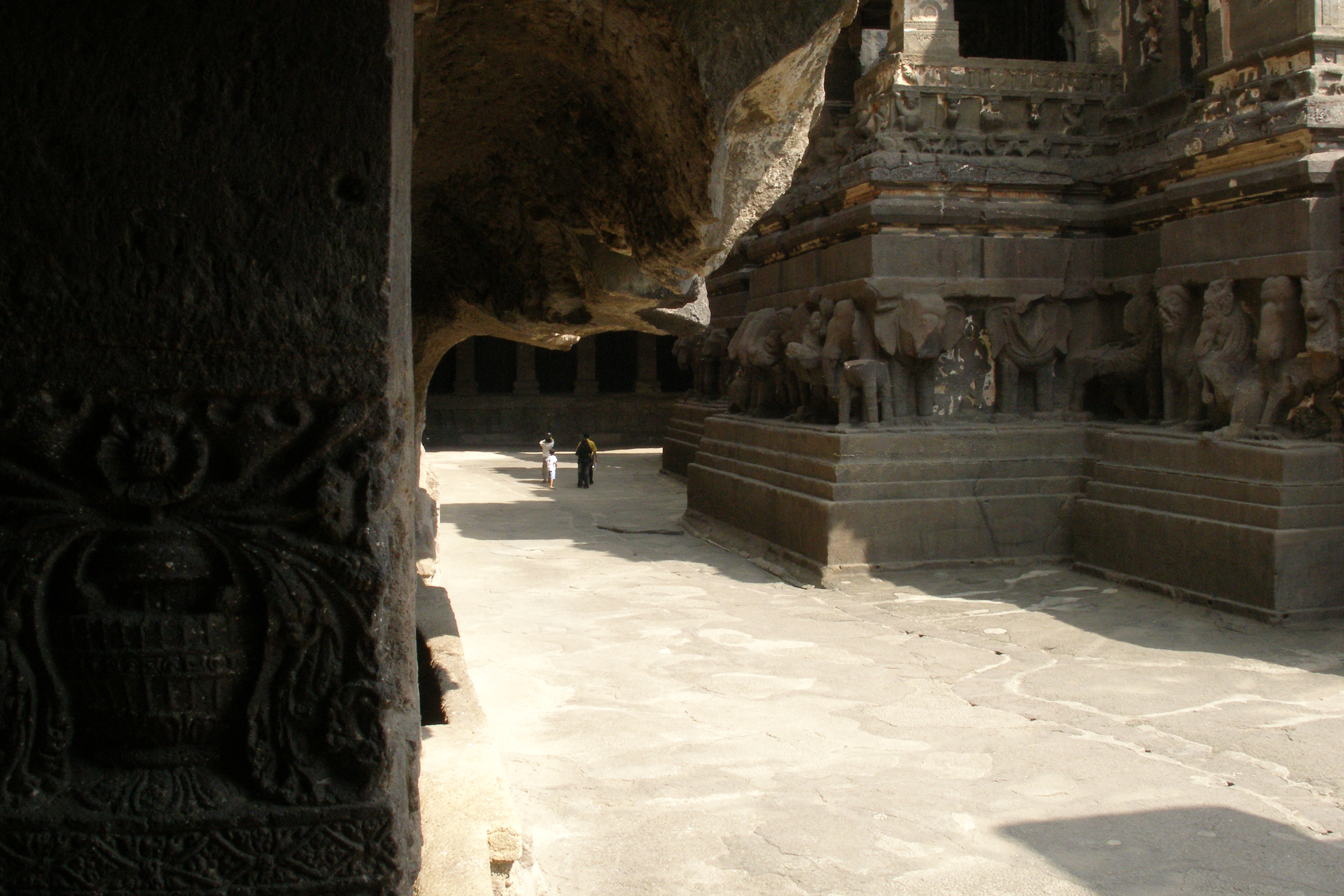
Kailasa temple is a megalith carved out of one single basalt rock.

Buddhist and Hindu cave temples at Ellora and the Ajanta Caves contain fine artistic design elements and India's oldest wall paintings can be seen here. Maharashtra's famous rock-cut caves have several distinct artistic elements though sculptures of the time are regarded to modern viewers as stiff and not dynamic. The Buddhist caves, particularly the older ones, are either temples (Chaityas) or monasteries (Viharas).

== Medieval ==
=== Hindu ===
During the early medieval period, the Maharashtrian region's architecture was largely based on a combination of old and new Nagara styles. Bhimashankar temple is considered to be a unique mix of these two Nagara styles. During the late period, Hemadri a court polymath of Yadavas of Deogiri used his unique combinational Nagara style to create many temples, which were again rebuilt due to numerous Islamic clashes and their penchant for destroying Hindu places of worship. Foremost among these are Trayambakeshwar Temple, Tulja Bhavani temple, Ghrishneshwar temple among others.

=== Indo-Islamic ===
Some structures at the Daulatabad Fort (Note: The Daulatabad Fort itself was built by the Yadava dynasty in the 12th century CE, and the Indo-Islamic structures were added later by the Delhi Sultanate in the 14th century CE.) is the earliest examples of Indo-Islamic architecture in Maharashtra.

The medieval Ahmednagar Sultanate built the Ahmednagar Fort, Tomb of Salabat Khan II and Bagh Rauza in Ahmednagar. Their style is similar to that of the other Deccan Sultanates.

The best example of Mughal architecture in Maharashtra is Bibi ka Maqbara built by Mughal Emperor Aurangzeb, which is a replica of the Taj Mahal.

=== Maratha ===
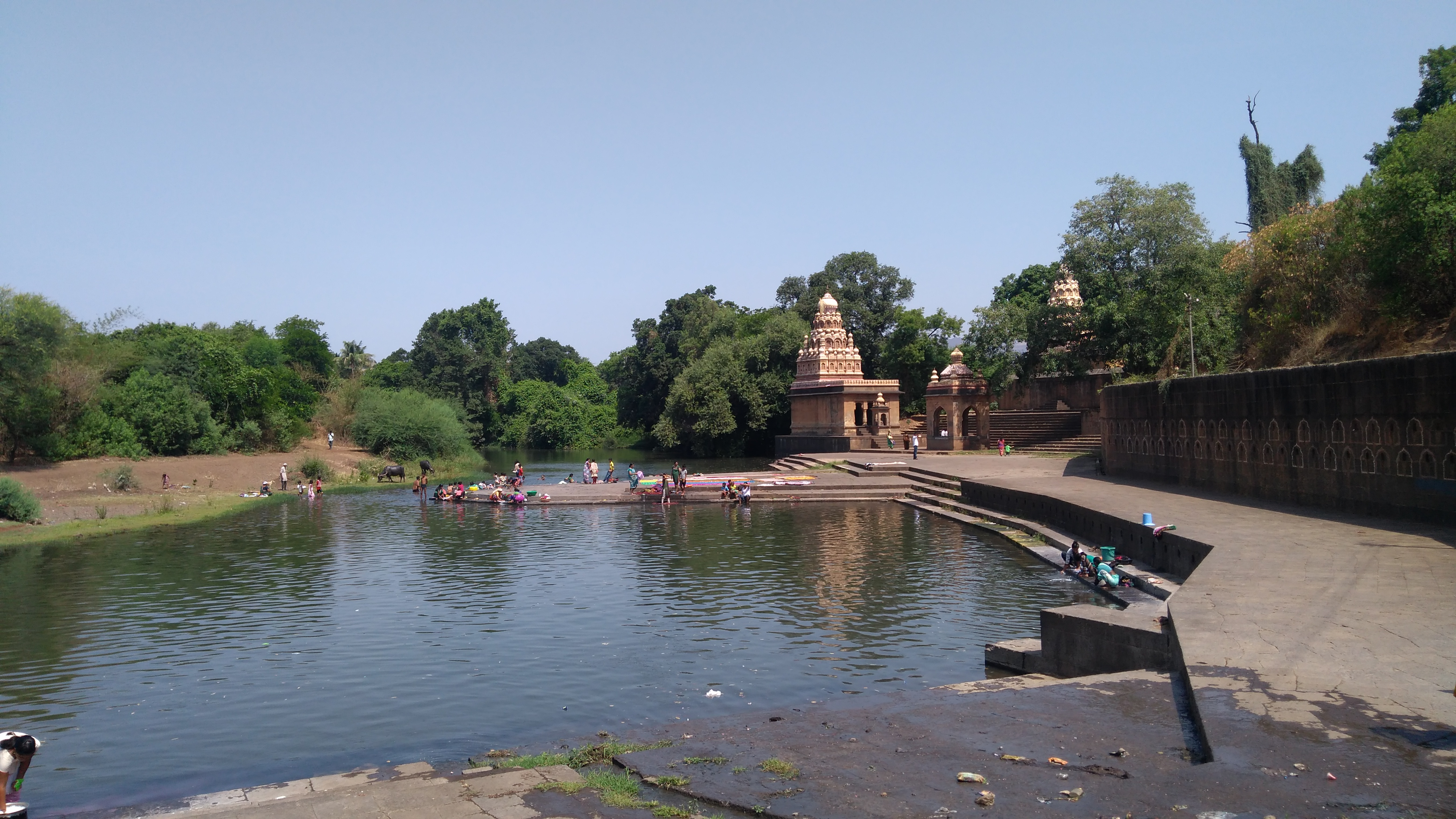
Ghat on the Krishna River at Menavali commissioned by Nana Phadnavis

The Maratha Empire ruled between the 17th and 19th centuries. They were constantly at war against the Mughal Empire. Therefore, several fortifications were built throughout the area, including Shaniwar Wada, Pratapgad, Raigad and Mangad.Jijabai built the Lal Mahal in Pune. During the Maratha era, many of the popular temples were built/revived all over Maharashtra. They reflect a peculiar architectural style regarded as Maratha Architecture.Steps on river banks called Ghat built by Maratha rulers may be the greatest legacy of Maratha rule in Maharashtra, and other place around india.

== Colonial ==
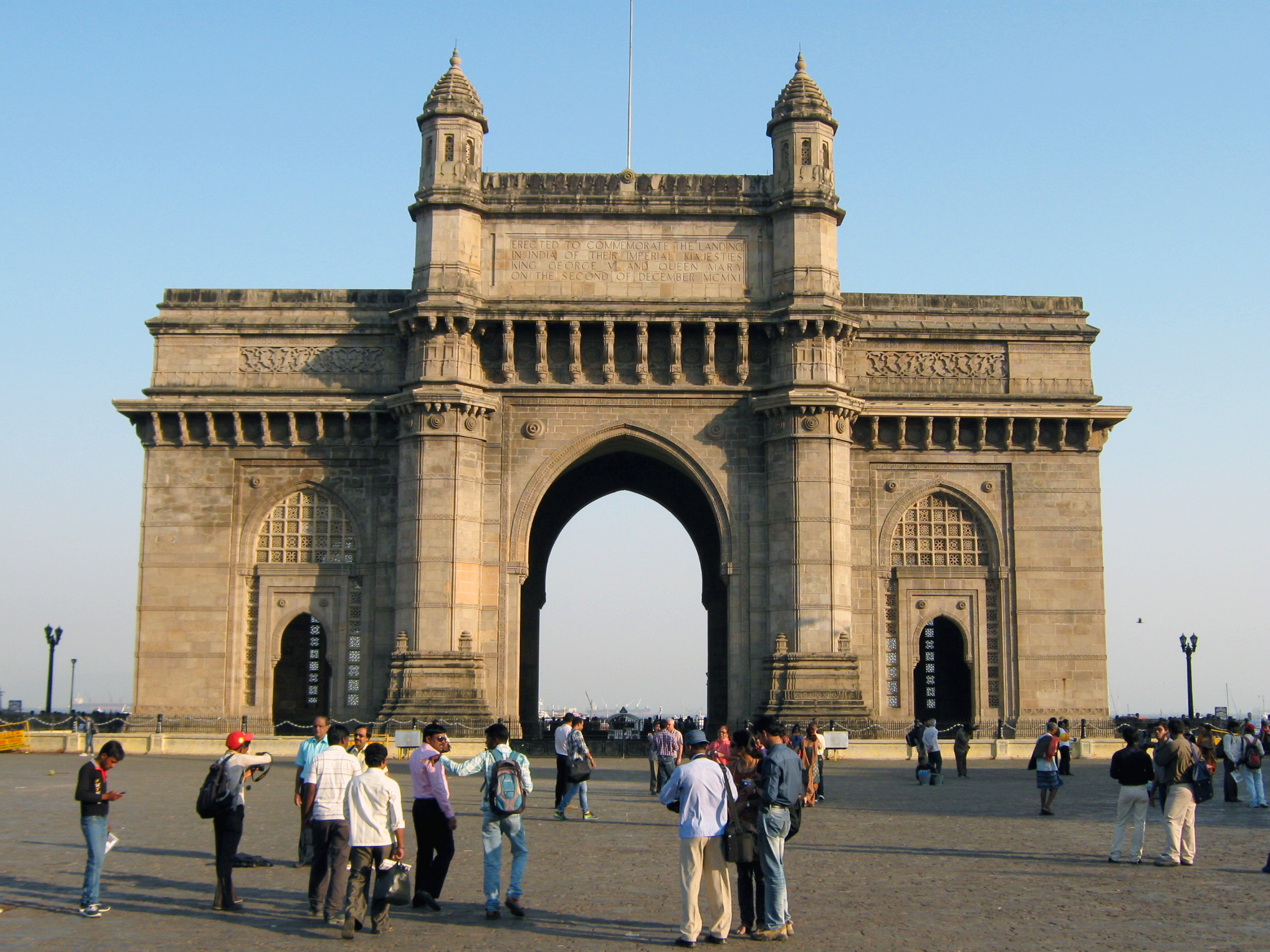
Gateway of India in Mumbai, built to commemorate the visit of King George V and Queen Mary to India. It was designed by George Witttet in the Indo-Saracenic style.

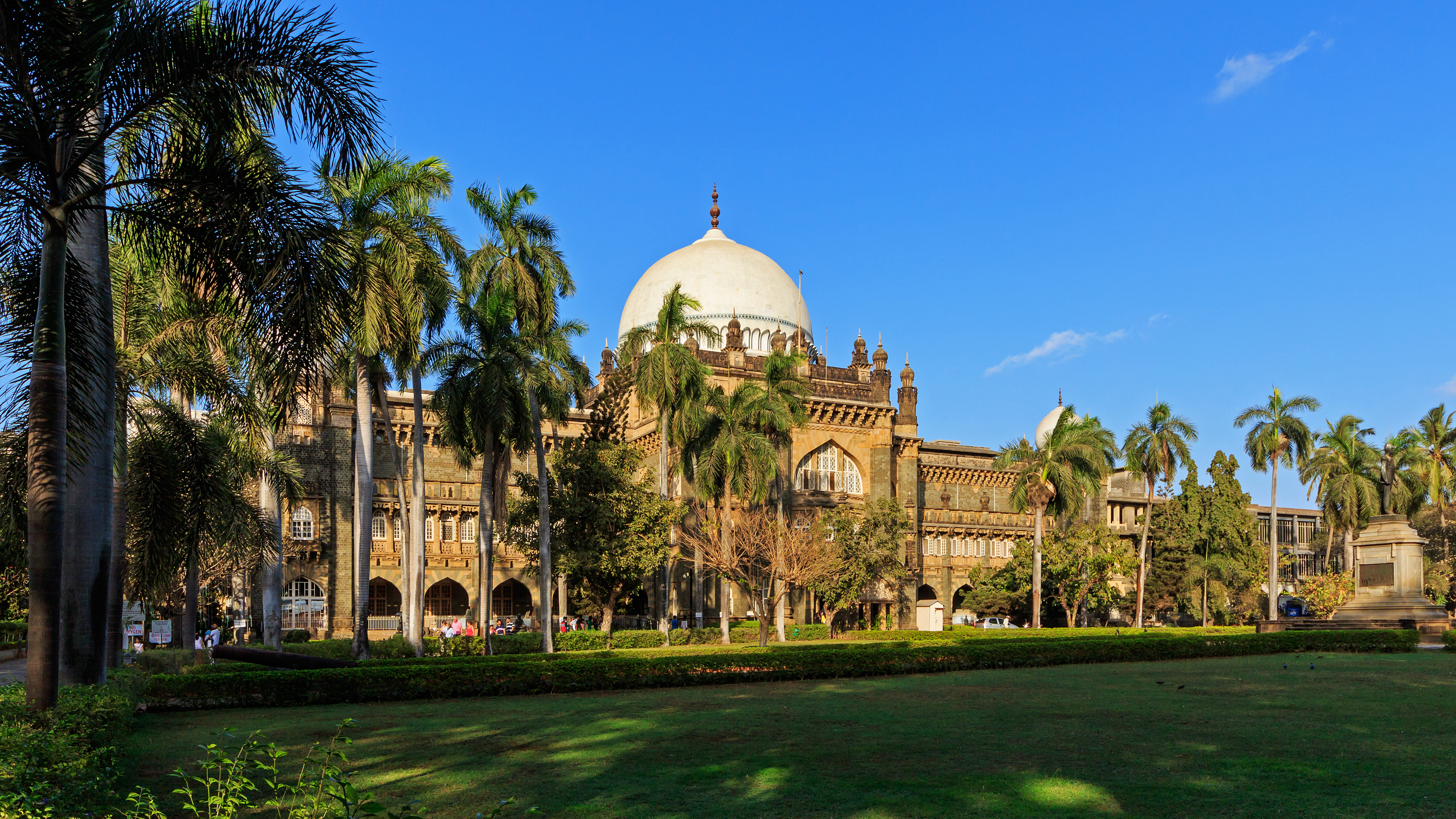
Chhatrapati Shivaji Maharaj Vastu Sangrahalaya (Note: The name translates to "King Shivaji Museum")

=== British Colonial ===
During the British colonial era, European styles became prevalent, especially in Mumbai(Bombay at that time). The most significant examples are the two World Heritage sites of Mumbai ― Chhatrappati Shivaji terminus (designed by Frederick William Stevens in the gothic revival style), and the Victorian and Art Deco ensemble of Mumbai (consisting of Bombay High Court, Rajabai Clock Tower and University of Mumbai). Other examples include and Municipal Corporation Building and Asiatic Society in Mumbai and Fergusson College of Pune.

==== Indo-Saracenic ====
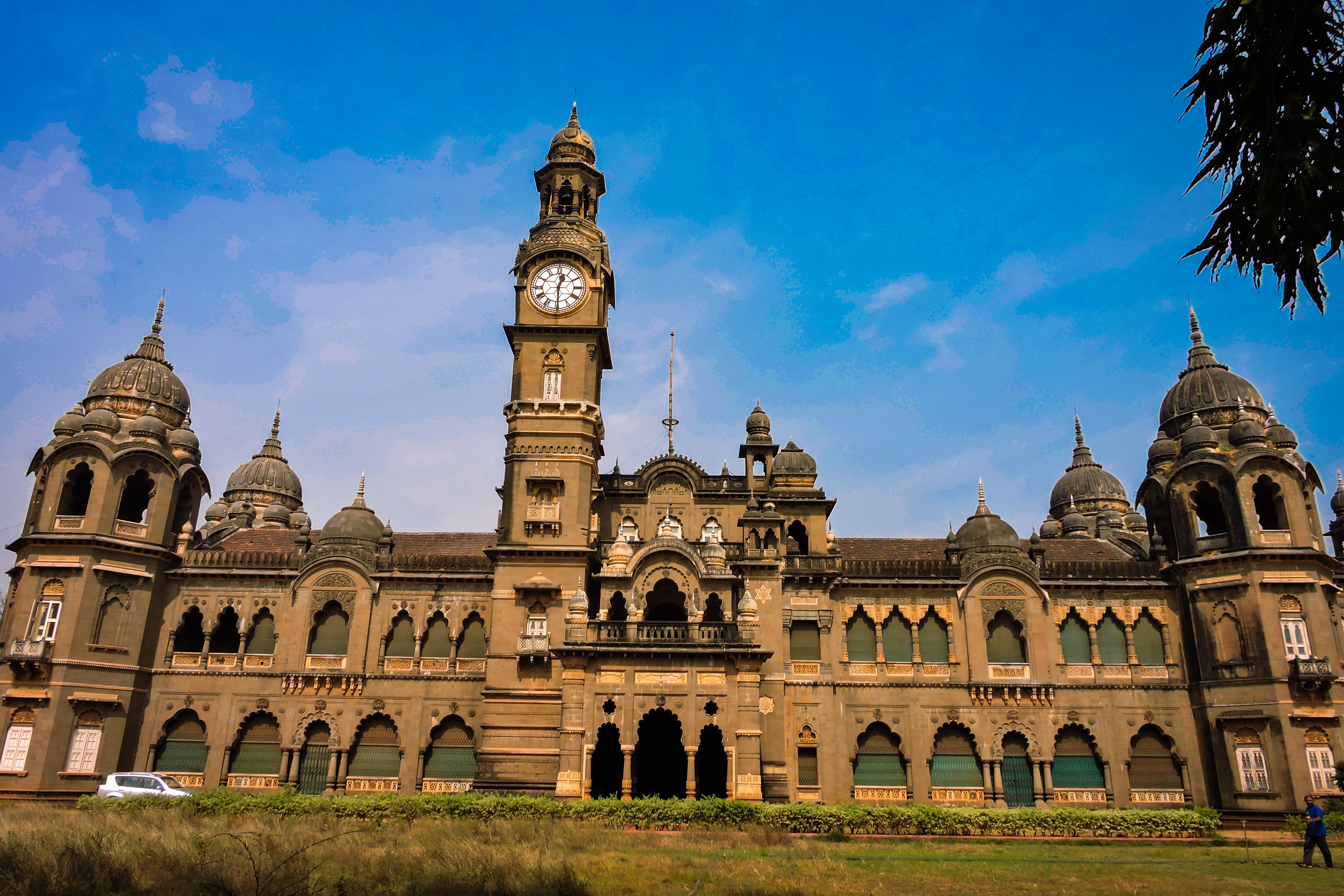
New palace, Kolhapur, an example of Indo-saracenic architecture

A new architectural style known as the Indo-Saracenic Revival Architecture developed, a combination of British and Indian styles. The best examples of this style are Gateway of India, Taj Mahal Hotel, Chhatrapati Shivaji Maharaj Vastu Sangrahalaya (formerly Prince of Wales Museum) in Mumbai.

== Gallery ==
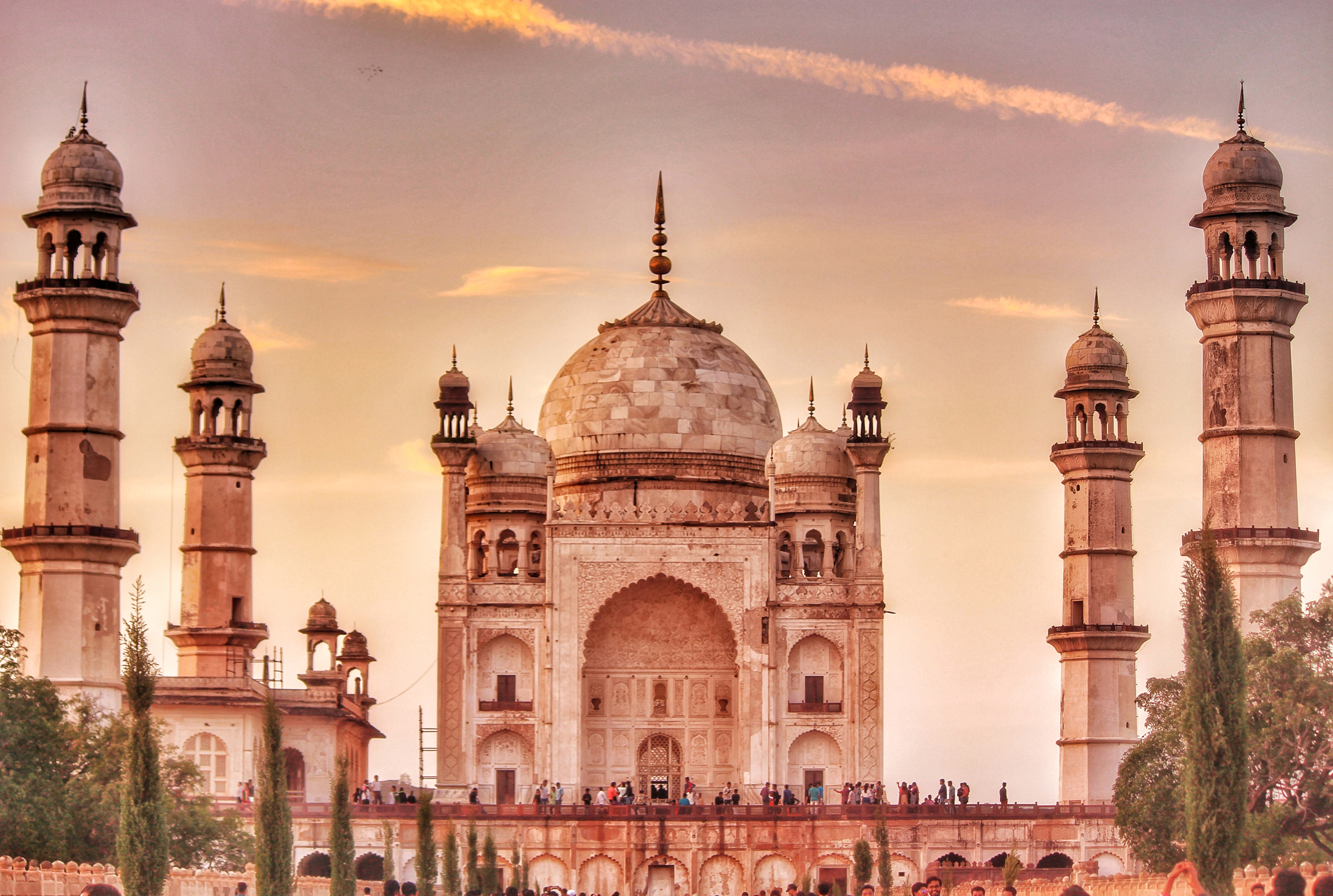
Bibi Ka Maqbara at Aurangabad, a replica of the Taj Mahal built during the reign of Aurangzeb. It was commissioned by his son Azam Shah.

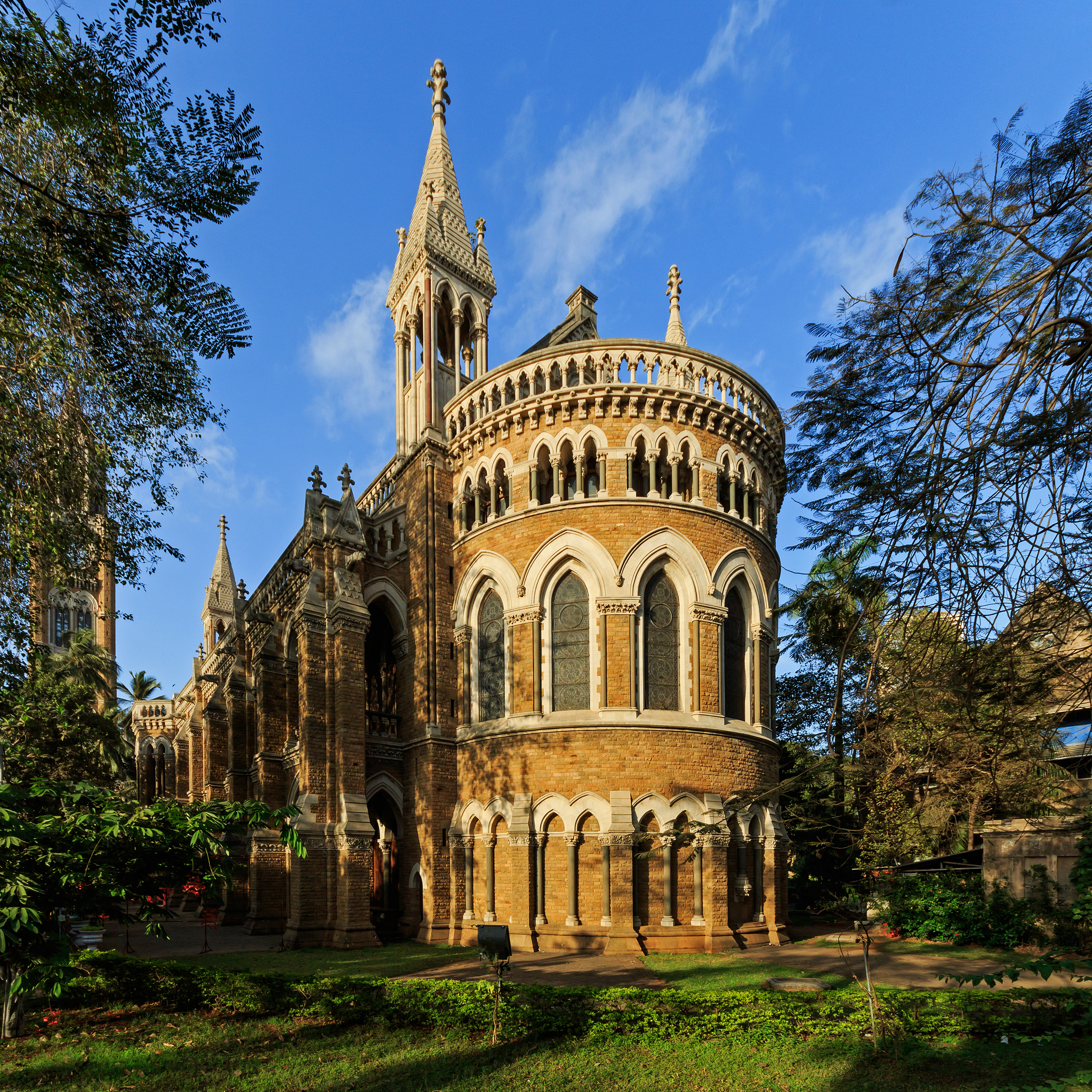
The Fort campus of the University of Mumbai was established in 1857.

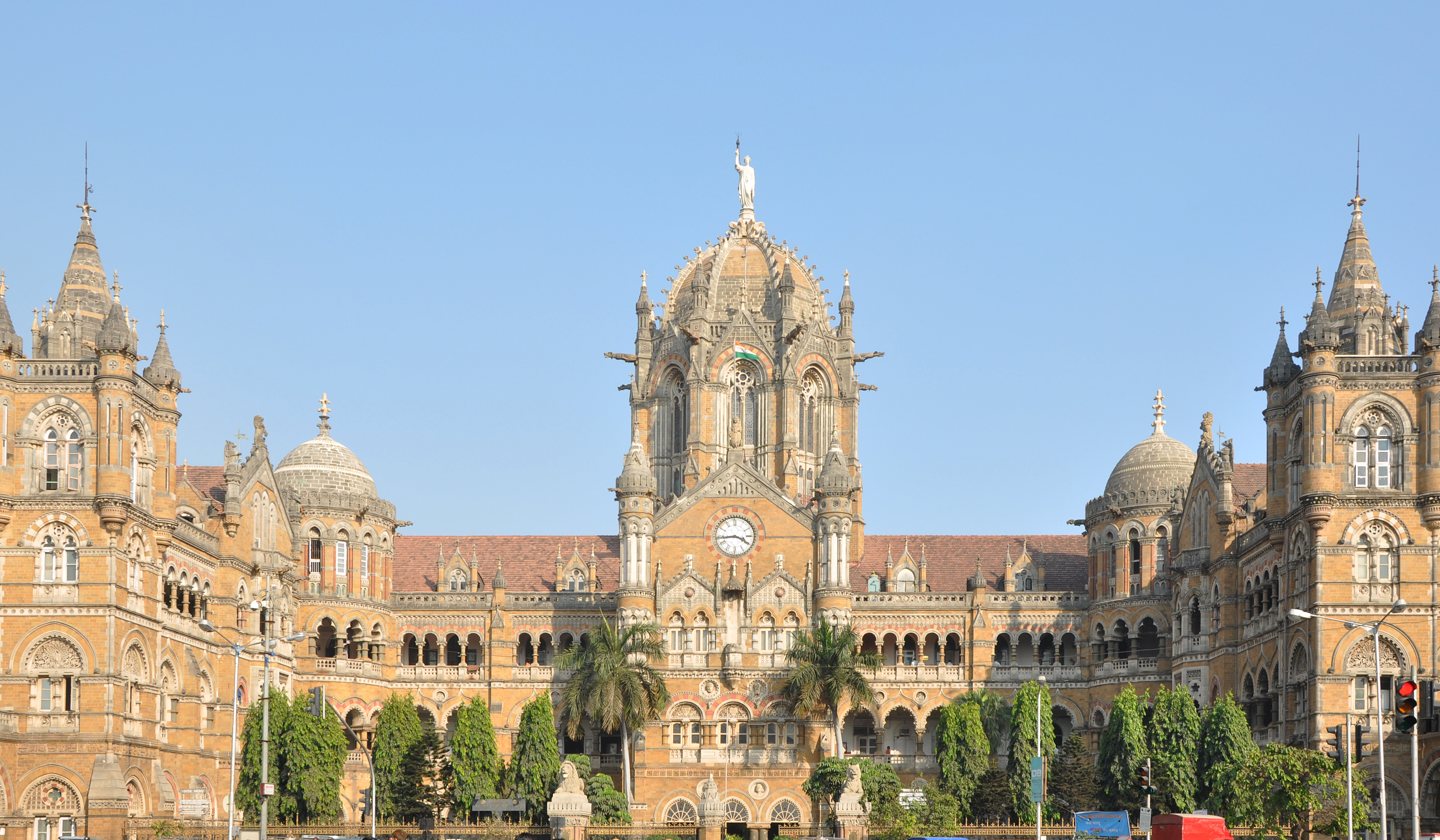
The present building of the Chhatrapati Shivaji Terminus was designed by Frederick William Stevens in the Victorian Gothic style and completed in 1888.
