= Capital of Maharashtra =

Capital of Maharashtra may refer to:

- Mumbai, summer capital of Maharashtra - Largest City in Maharashtra
- Nagpur, winter capital of Maharashtra - Third largest city in Maharashtra
