= Kyatanahalli =

Kyatanahalli is a village in the Arsikere taluk of Hassan district in the state of Karnataka, India. It is about 28 km from Arsikere town. Arsikere is the central place for tourists visiting Belur (40 km), Halebidu (25 km), Mavuthanahalli (20 km), and Shravanabelagola (80 km).
