= Arehalli =

- Village
- Location in Karnataka, India Arehalli (India)
- Coordinates: 13°02′45″N 75°48′15″E
- Country: India
- State: Karnataka
- District: Hassan
- Taluka: Belur

Government
  - Body: Gram panchayat

Area
  - Total: 5.1584 km^{2} (1.9917 sq mi)
- Elevation: 1,055 m (3,461 ft)

Population (2011)
  - Total: 7,467
  - Density: 1,448/km^{2} (3,749/sq mi)

Languages
  - Official: Kannada
- Time zone: UTC+5:30 (IST)
- PIN: 573101
- Vehicle registration: KA-46

Arehalli is a village in the state of Karnataka in southern India. As per census 2011, the location code number of Arehalli is 615144. It is located in the Belur taluk of Hassan district in Karnataka, and is about 230 kilometres from the state capital Bangalore, and 146 kilometres from the chief port city of Mangalore. It is well connected by road through the city of Hassan. The nearest airport is Mangalore International Airport at 160 km, and the nearest major railway station is Hassan Junction railway station located at a distance of 46 km; Sakleshpura railway station is 17 km away.

== Agriculture ==
Local farmers grow coffee (also known as Arehalli Coffee) on their plantation lands. Arehalli contributes 40% of coffee to Karnataka's 71% of contribution in the country's coffee production. According to Arnold Wright, who wrote a book on the state of Mysore dated 1914, Sir Basil Scott (former Chief Justice of Bombay, British India in 1914) owned a coffee plantation in Arehalli.

== See also ==
- Hassan
- Districts of Karnataka
