= Agalahalli =

Coordinates: 13°03′N 76°02′E

- village
- Interactive map of Agalahalli
- Country: India
- State: Karnataka
- District: Hassan
- Talukas: Hassan, India

Government
  - Body: Village Panchayat

Languages
  - Official: Kannada
- Time zone: UTC+5:30 (IST)
- Nearest city: Hassan, India
- Civic agency: Village Panchayat

Agalahalli is a village in the southern state of Karnataka, India, in the Hassan taluk of Hassan district.

== See also ==
- Hassan
- Districts of Karnataka
