= Yaraganalu =

- Village
- Country: India
- Tehsil: Arsikere
- District: Hassan district
- States: Karnataka
- Elevation: 817 m (2,680 ft)
- Time zone: UTC+5.30 (Indian Standard Time)
- Indian Postal Code: Lalanakere

Yaraganalu also known as Yeraganalu is a village located in Karnataka, India. It belongs to the Hassan district.

== Administration ==
The village is administered according to Panchayati Raj Act and Constitution of India which appoints Sarpanch as the Head of the village.

== Population ==
According to the 2011 Indian census, the village consists of 174 families, of which 311 people are male and 323 are females.

== Literacy ==
The village has a male literacy of 82.41 percent whereas female literacy rate is 67.43 percent according to the 2011 census.
