= Bendekere =

Coordinates: 13°22′N 76°13′E

Bendekere is a village in Hassan district in Karnataka state, India. It is situated 5km away from sub-district headquarter Arsikere and 50km away from district headquarter Hassan.
