= Haanagal =

Haanagal Haanagal
- Village
- Location in Karnataka, India Haanagal (India)
- Coordinates: 12.7°N 76.3°E
- Country: India
- State: Karnataka
- District: Hassan
- Elevation: 972 m (3,189 ft)

Population (2001)
  - Total: 400

Languages
  - Official: Kannada
- Time zone: UTC+5:30 (IST)

Haanagal is a village in Hassan district, Karnataka, India.

It has a moderate climate year-round with little pollution. The population includes 4 to 5 different demographic components.

Haanagal has a small lake which is the main water supply for the village and the surrounding agricultural land.

== Religion ==
Most of the population are Hindu, and the village has a few Rama-Mandiras and Hindu temples. The main deity in the major temple of the village is "Hanagallamma", and in Rama-Mandiras people worship "Sri Ramachandra".

== Education ==
The village has elementary and high schools. For higher education students prefer to go to the cities.

== Transport ==
Public transportation to Haanagal is available twice daily, a transportation service level similar to that provided to other remote villages in India.

== Culture ==
The village has an annual festival called Jatre or Hanagallamma Rathothsava attended by people from nearby villages, and by residents of larger cities who come to visit family members in Haanagal. The event lasts two days and the whole village is decorated.
