= Gudibande Poornima =

Indian writer

Gudibande Poornima (Dr. S.P Poornima) is a Kannada poet, writer and novelist from the State of Karnataka, India. Born in Shravanabelagola, Hassan District, Karnataka, Poornima holds a master's degree in Kannada literature from Bangalore University, master's degree in Prakrit and Docotorate degree in Jainalogy from Mysore University. She was the president of the district Kannada Sahitya Parishat in 1982–3.

She has published more than 60 books in Kannada in various categories of literature - novels, poem collections, article collections, research, biographies, etc. She has published more than 100 research papers, articles in many Kannada magazines, newspapers and journals.

She has also presided the Chikkaballapura District Kannada Sahitya Sammelana, held in Shidlaghatta in the year 2013.

== Awards ==
Gudibande poornima has won many awards like, Sahitya Akademi Award, Shri Gomateshwara Vidyapeetha award, Mallika award, Sharada Seva Shree, etc.

The Karanataka Lekhakiyara Sangha, an organization and association of women writers has established a yearly award in her name which is called as "The Gudibande Poornima awards for poets" is given to prominent Kannada Women poets every year.
