= Gubbi, Holenarasipura =

Gubbi Jodigubbi
- Village
- Location in Karnataka, India Gubbi (India)
- Coordinates: 12.700558°N 76.162897°E
- Country: India
- State: Karnataka
- District: Hassan
- Taluk: Holenarasipura

Government
  - Body: Grama Panchayath

Area
  - Total: 5.65 km^{2} (2.18 sq mi)
- Elevation: 895 m (2,936 ft)

Population (2011)
  - Total: 1,275
  - Density: 226/km^{2} (584/sq mi)

Languages
  - Official: Kannada
- Time zone: UTC+5:30 (IST)
- PIN: 573102
- Telephone code: 08175
- Vehicle registration: KA-13

Gubbi also known as Jodigubbi is a small, but significant village in Holenarasipura taluk of Hassan district, in the state of Karnataka, India.

Location code of the village as per Census 2011, is 616944.

== Location ==
Jodigubbi lies on Arkalgud-Halli Mysore road and is 7.5 km south from Arakalagudu-Holenarasipura Highway (Jodigubbi Cross). It is 18 km from its taluk headquarter, Holenarasipura, 14 km from Arkalgud, 45 km from its district headquarter, Hassan and 190 km from state capital, Bengaluru.

== Agriculture ==
Major crops grown in this region are Tobacco, Arecanut and Coconut. Paddy is also grown here because of presence of Canal irrigation from Hemavati Reservoir.

== Banks ==
1. Karnataka Gramin Bank
