= Manjarabad Fort =

1792 fort in Hassan district, Karnataka, India

Manjarabad fort
- Sakleshpura, Karnataka, India
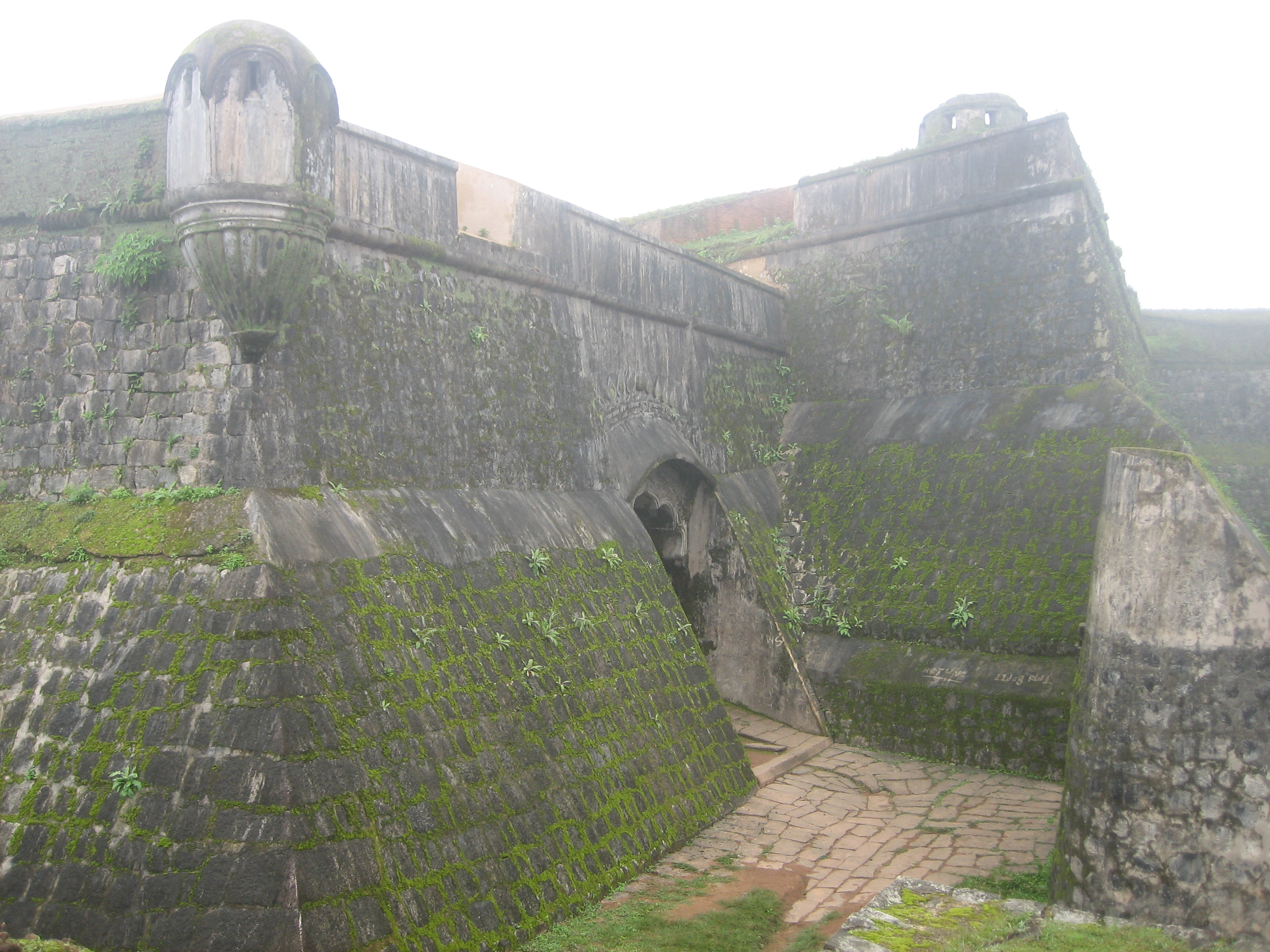
- Entrance view of the Manjarabad fort

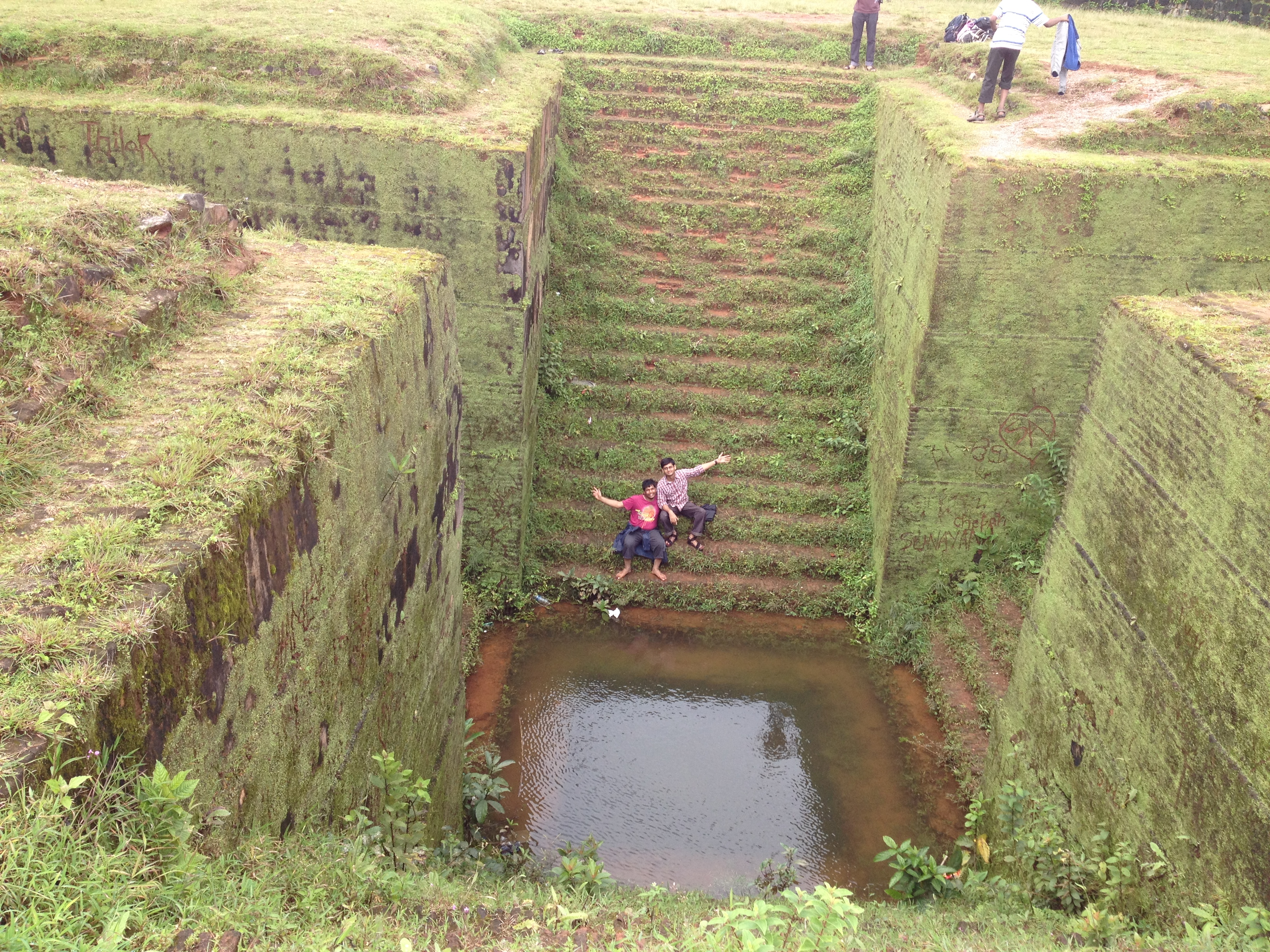
- A deep well within the Manjarabad fort

Site information
- Type: Fort
- Open to the public: Yes
- Condition: Partially restored

Location
- Location within India
- Coordinates: 12.91°N 75.755°E
- Height: 19.26

Site history
- Built: 1792
- Built by: Tipu Sultan
- In use: 18th century
- Battles/wars: Many

Manjarabad fort is a star fort built in 1792 by Tipu Sultan, Sultan of Mysore following French star-shaped fort designs made popular by Sébastien Le Prestre de Vauban that deflect cannon fire and allow guns to cover all approaches without dead positions. It is in the Hassan district in the Indian state of Karnataka.

== Location ==
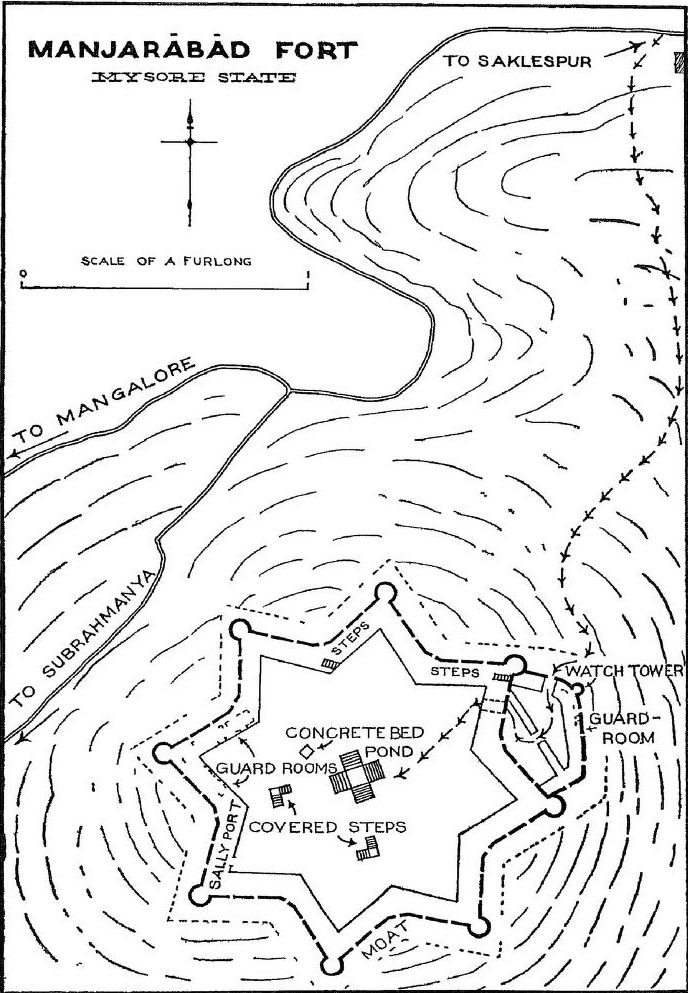
Layout

The fort is located in Sakaleshpura taluk, 4 kilometres (2.5 mi) away from the Sakaleshpura town to its south west, which is on the right bank of the Hemavati River, 23 miles (37 km) from Hassan on the National Highway 75 that runs from Bangalore to Mangalore.

Since the fort is located on a hill at an elevation of 988 metres (3,241 ft), it gives a clear and commanding view of the surroundings. On a clear day, even the Arabian sea can also be seen from the fort.

== History ==
Tipu Sultan built the fort in 1792 at a time when he was establishing his sovereignty over Mysore, fighting against other South Indian dynasties. At this time even the Marathas and the Nizam of Hyderabad had aligned with the British. The Sultan wanted to make the highway between Mangalore and Coorg secure for his expansion programmes. Because he was allied with the French at that time against the British, he sought the help of French engineers to build a star fort of the European style.

The completed fort was inspected by Tipu Sultan who then found it enveloped in fog and hence named it as Manjarabad fort; the name Manjara is a Persian version of 'Manzar' meaning "Scene" which makes Manjarabad as "The city of Scenes or Scenic City".

== Features ==
The fort, as built and existing, is an eight-pointed star. The external walls of the fort have been built with granite stones and lime mortar while the interior buildings, which accommodate army barracks, armoury, stores and others, have been built with fired bricks. Apart from these, two cellars were built next to a deep well which were underground structures used to store gunpowder, and these rooms remained cool even during summer months.

Tourism is not well developed in the area. The Tourism Department of Karnataka, pressed by demands from local people of Sakaleshpura, have plans to create basic amenities around the fort and also develop a park.

== Bibliography ==
- DeSouza, Frank S. (November 2013). The Anonymous Birthright. Author House. ISBN 978-1-4918-8469-0.
- Imprint, Amanda. Academic GK Matter-6. Laxmi Publications. ISBN 978-93-80644-70-7.
- Rice, Benjamin Lewis (1876). Mysore and Coorg: Mysore, by districts. Mysore Government Press.
