= Nageshvara-Chennakeshava Temple complex, Mosale =

Nageshvara and Chennakeshava temples pair
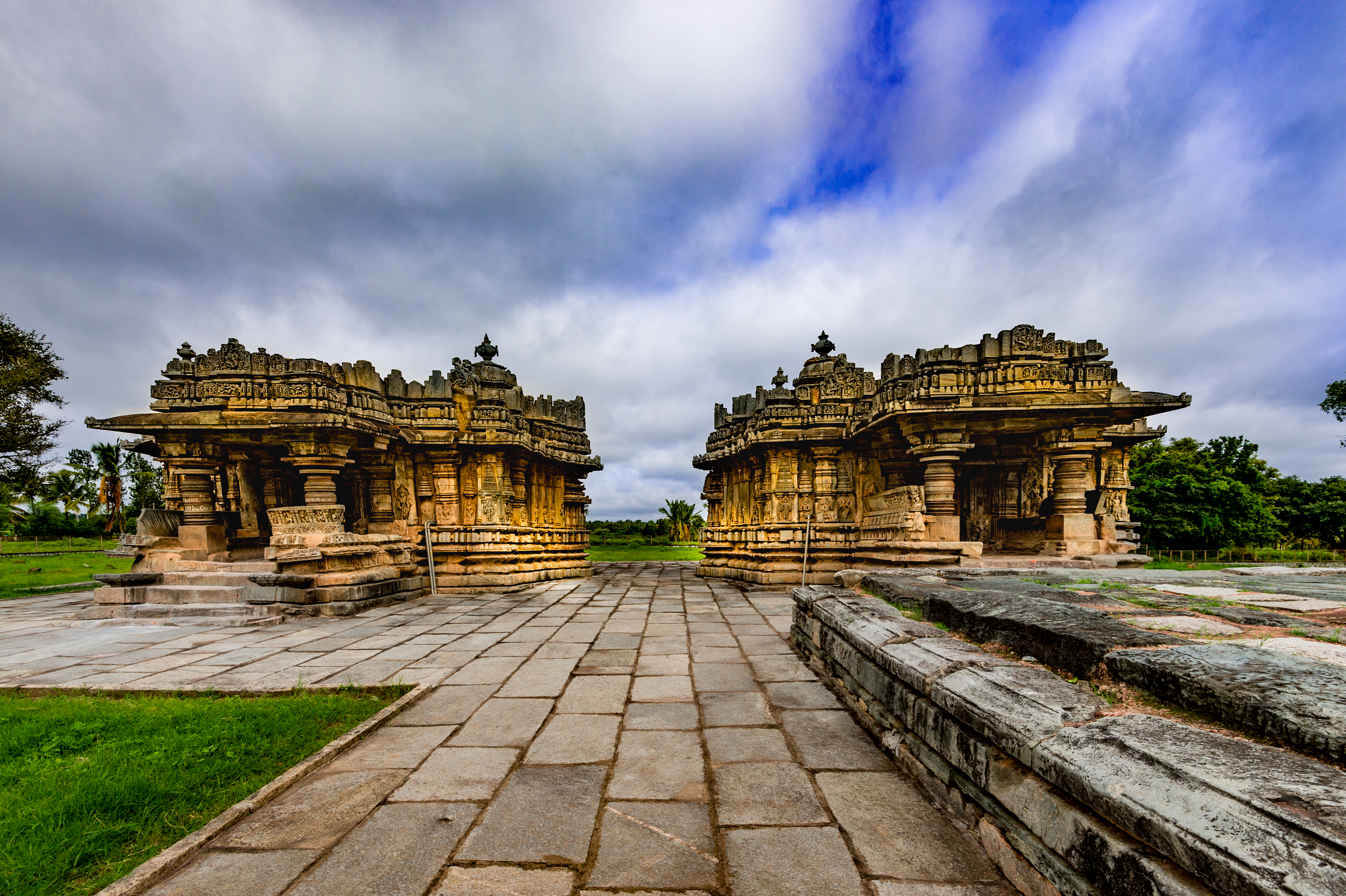

- Location within India Location within Karnataka

Religion
- Affiliation: Hinduism
- District: Hassan
- Deity: Shiva, Vishnu

Location
- Location: Mosale village
- State: Karnataka
- Country: India
- Interactive map of Nageshvara and Chennakeshava temples pair
- Coordinates: 12°54′06.0″N 76°08′31.7″E

Architecture
- Type: Hoysala
- Creator: unknown
- Completed: unknown, c. 1200 CE

The Nageshvara-Chennakeshava temple complex, sometimes referred to as the Nagesvara and Chennakesava temples of Mosale, is a pair of nearly identical Hindu temples in the village of Mosale near Hassan city, Karnataka, India. One for Shiva, other for Vishnu, this pair is a set of highly ornamented stone temples, illustrating the Hoysala architecture. These temples also include panels of artwork related to the goddess tradition of Hinduism (Shaktism) and Vedic deities. Another notable feature of these temples is the artwork in their ceilings, how the shilpins (artisans) integrated the historic pre-Hoysala architectural innovations from the Chalukya era. Further, the temples include north Indian Bhumija and south Indian Vesara aedicules on the outer walls above the panels. It is unclear when this temple pair was built, but given the style and architectural innovations embedded therein, it was likely complete before 1250 CE.

According to Dhaky – an architecture and history scholar, the interior of this temple pair is "gorgeously embellished" and the outer artwork is "handsomely decorated". This temple complex is protected as a monument of national importance by the Archaeological Survey of India.

== Location and date ==
It is located in the village of Mosale, about 10 kilometres (6 mi) south of Hassan city, in Hassan district of Karnataka state, India. The two temples are in the same complex, in an idyllic rural setting, and they form a "perfect twin".

It is unclear when the temple was built, as the foundation stone is missing and other inscriptions do not provide any clues. The style suggests this pair is a pre-1250 CE temple. According to Foekema, the temple was built in 1200 CE during the reign of Hoysala King Veera Ballala II.

== Architecture ==
By plan, the temples are simple single-shrined structures with all the standard features of Hoysala architecture; a porch entrance into a square closed mantapa or navaranga (hall with no windows and a thick wall) leading to the sanctum, and a superstructure (shikhara) over the main shrine fitting the description of a ekakuta (single shrine with top). The sanctum (garbhagriha) is connected to the hall by a vestibule called sukhanasi. The closed hall, whose inner and outer walls are decorated, has four central lathe turned pillars that support a bay ceiling. The temples are constructed next to each other. The Nageshvara temple (lit, "Lord of snakes"), dedicated to the Hindu god Shiva is in the south. The Chennakeshava temple (lit, "beautiful Vishnu"), dedicated to the Hindu god Vishnu, is to the north.

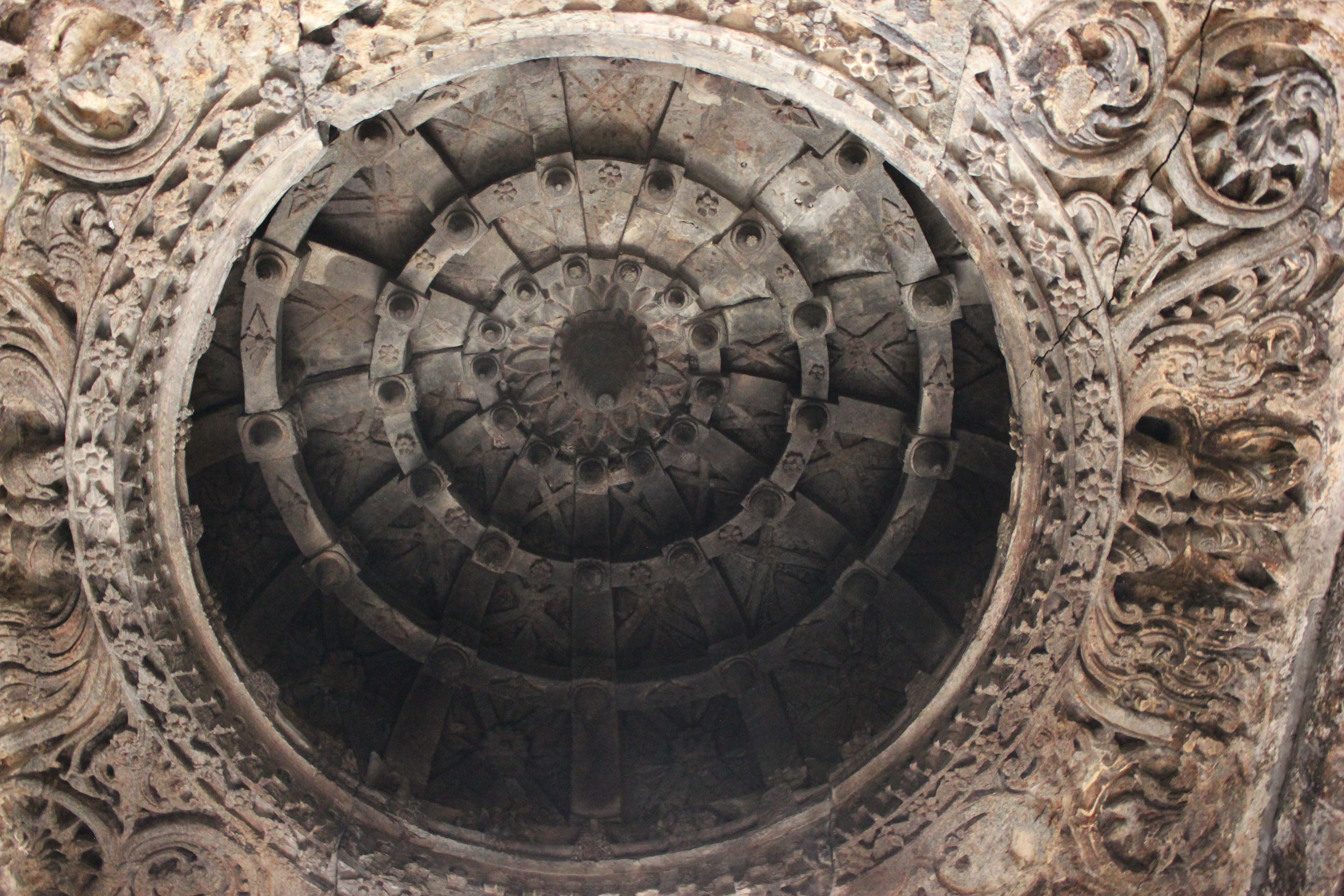
The notable ceiling artwork above the mantapa of the Nageshwar temple
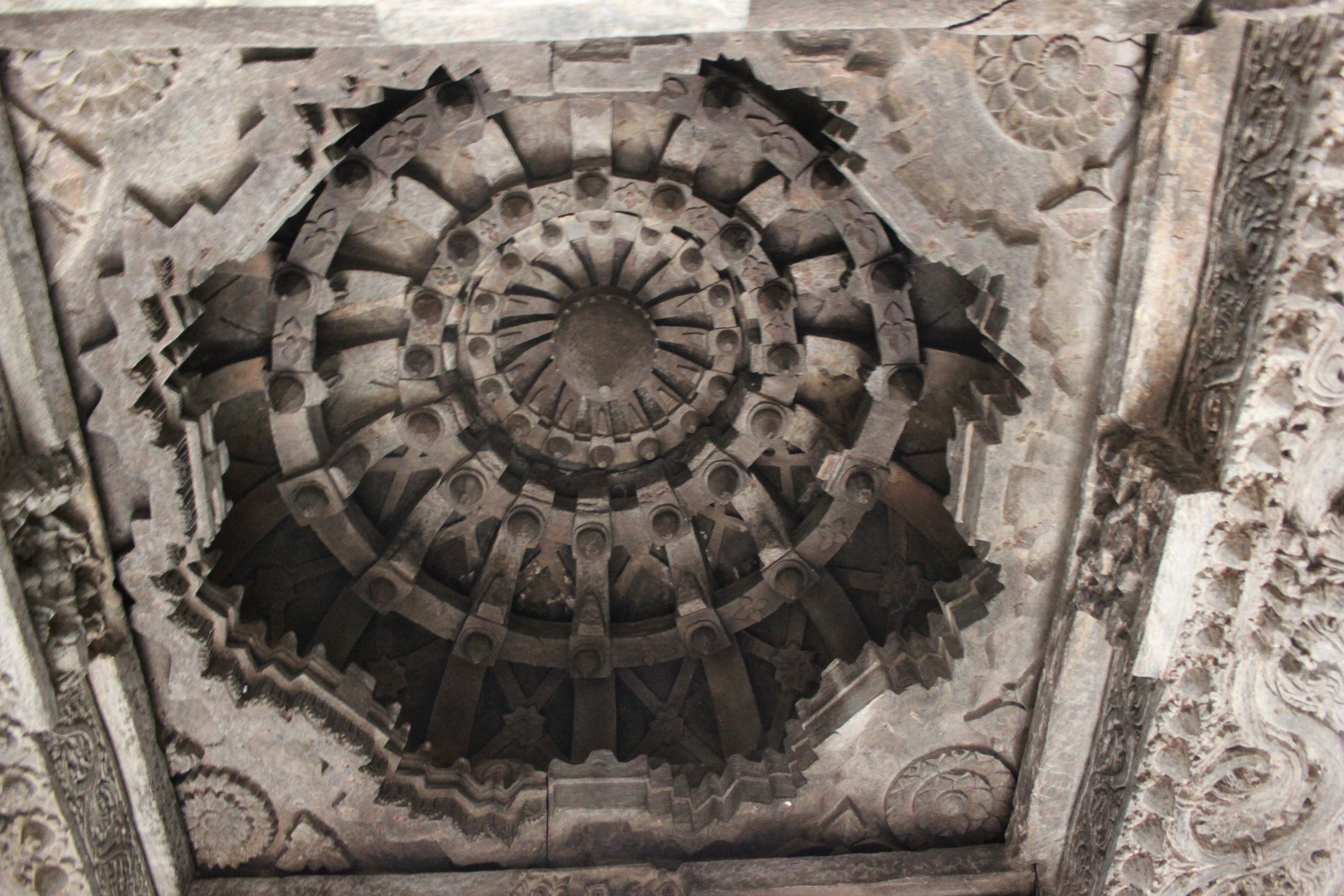
The notable ceiling artwork above the mantapa of the in Chennakesava temple

The superstructure (tower or shikhara) over each shrine is three tiered (tritala arpita) and vesara in style. It is intact, finely sculptured, and has a decorative low extension which is actually the tower over the vestibule (that connects the cella (sanctum) and the hall). The extension tower looks like the "nose" of the main superstructure and is also called sukhanasi. The sukanasi structure holds the Hoysala crest that depicts a royal warrior stabbing a lion. At the top of the superstructure of the shrine is a sculptured amalaka, whose ground surface area can be 2 × 2 meters. It is the largest piece of sculpture in the temple. The amalaka supports a decorative water pot like structure called the kalasha which is the apex of the tower. All these features are intact in both temples.

The decorative features found on the temple's outer wall (horizontal treatment) belong to the pre-Hoysala traditions. In this type of decorations, below the superstructure, an eaves that projects about half a meter runs all around the temple. Below the eaves are decorative Bhumija and Vesara miniature towers (aedicula) on pilasters. The large wall images of deities and their attendants are placed below these decorative towers. Some of these images are mutilated and damaged, but others are in reasonably preserved form to affirm their elegance and art. Some of the panel images at the Nageshvara temple have been signed by the artists on their pedestals.

The panels found in the Nagesvara temple include those of Sridevi, Lakshmidevi, Gauri, Maheshvari (another name for Parvati), Brahma, Sadashiva (form of Shiva), and Bhumidevi (representation of mother earth).

The Channakeshava temple has sculptures of Garuda (the eagle), Keshava (a form of Vishnu), Janardana, Venugopala, Madhava (a form of Krishna), and Bhudevi. Below these images, the base of the wall comprises five different horizontal moldings, one of which is a row of blocks.

== Gallery ==
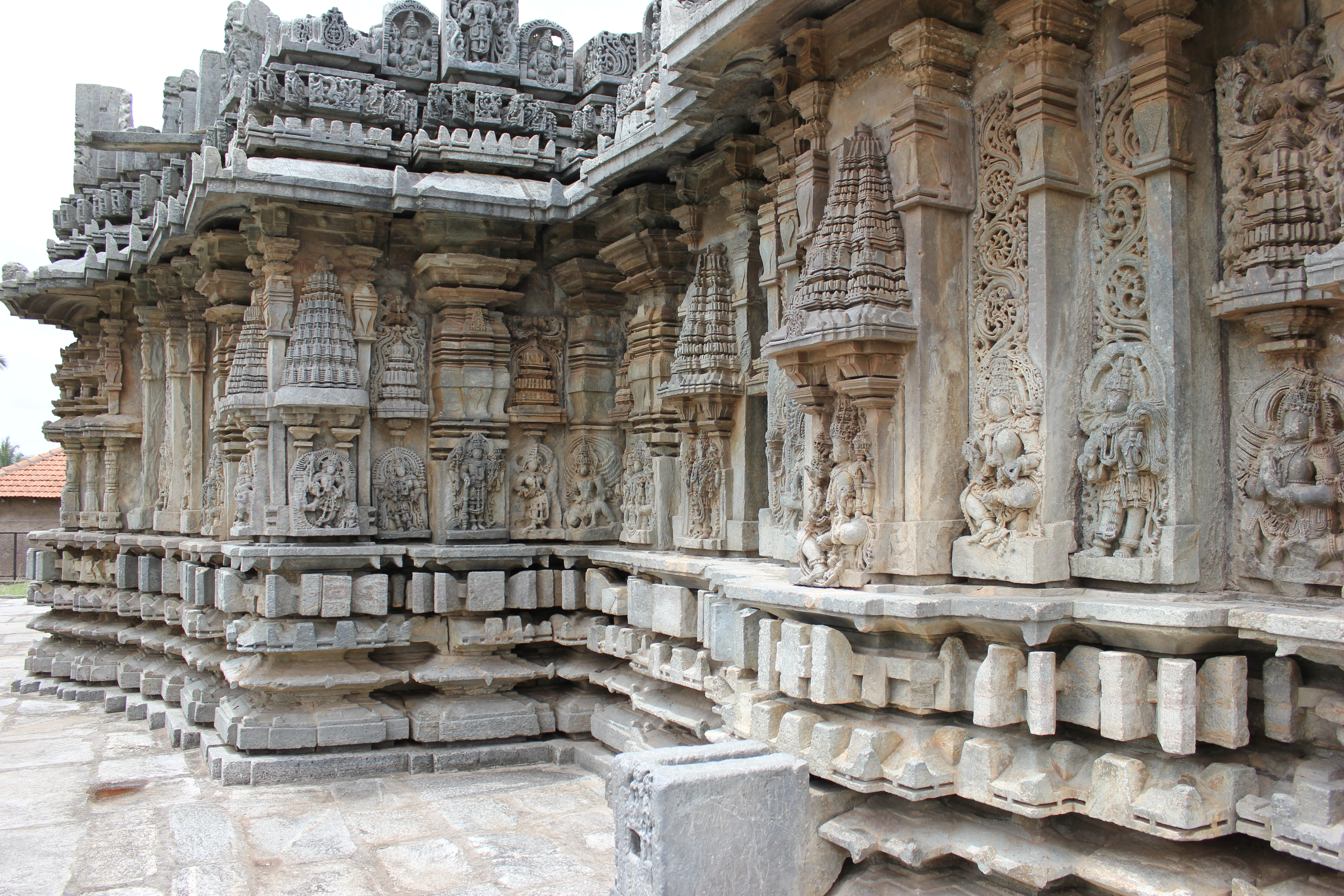
Outer wall decoration

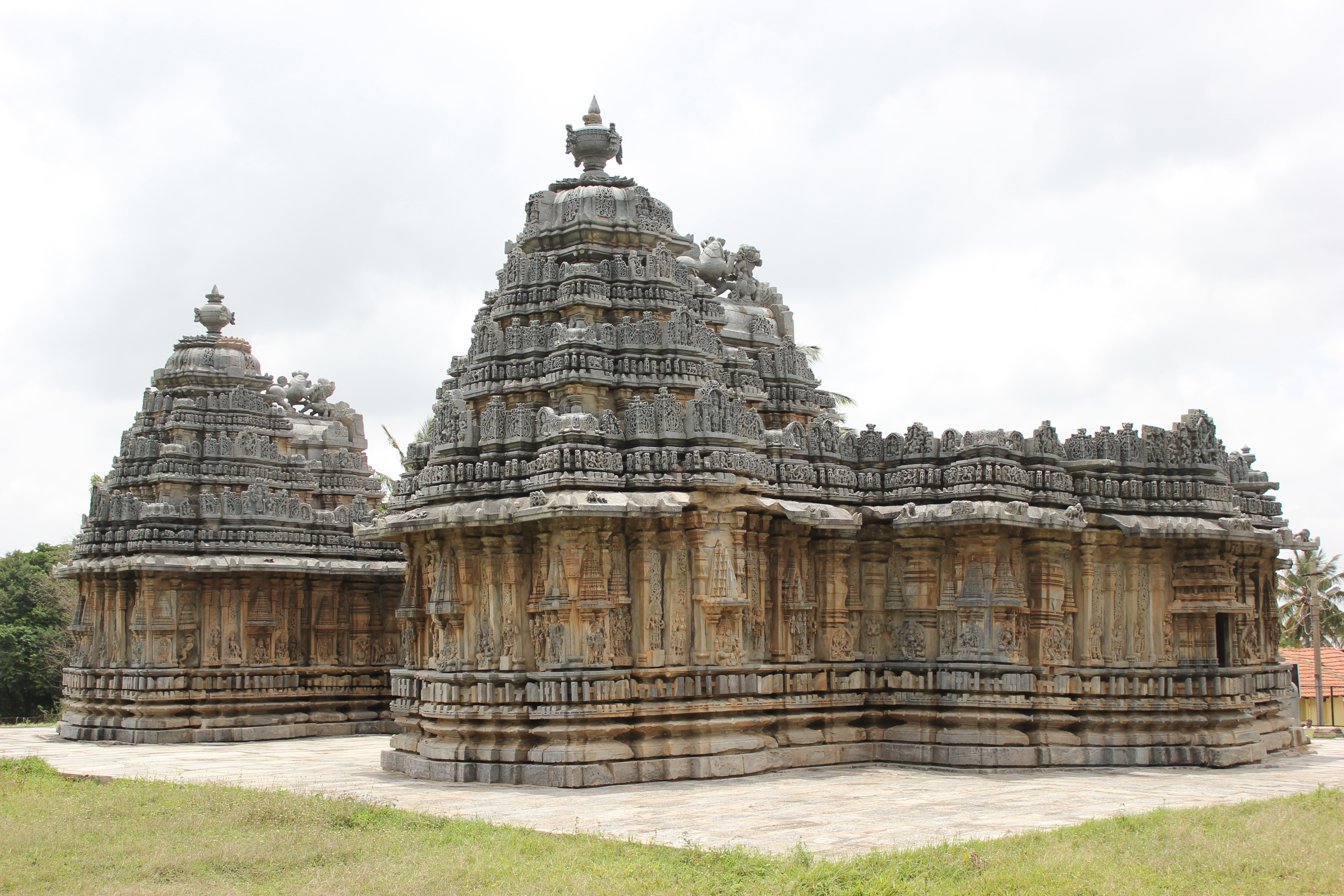
The twin temples of Mosale

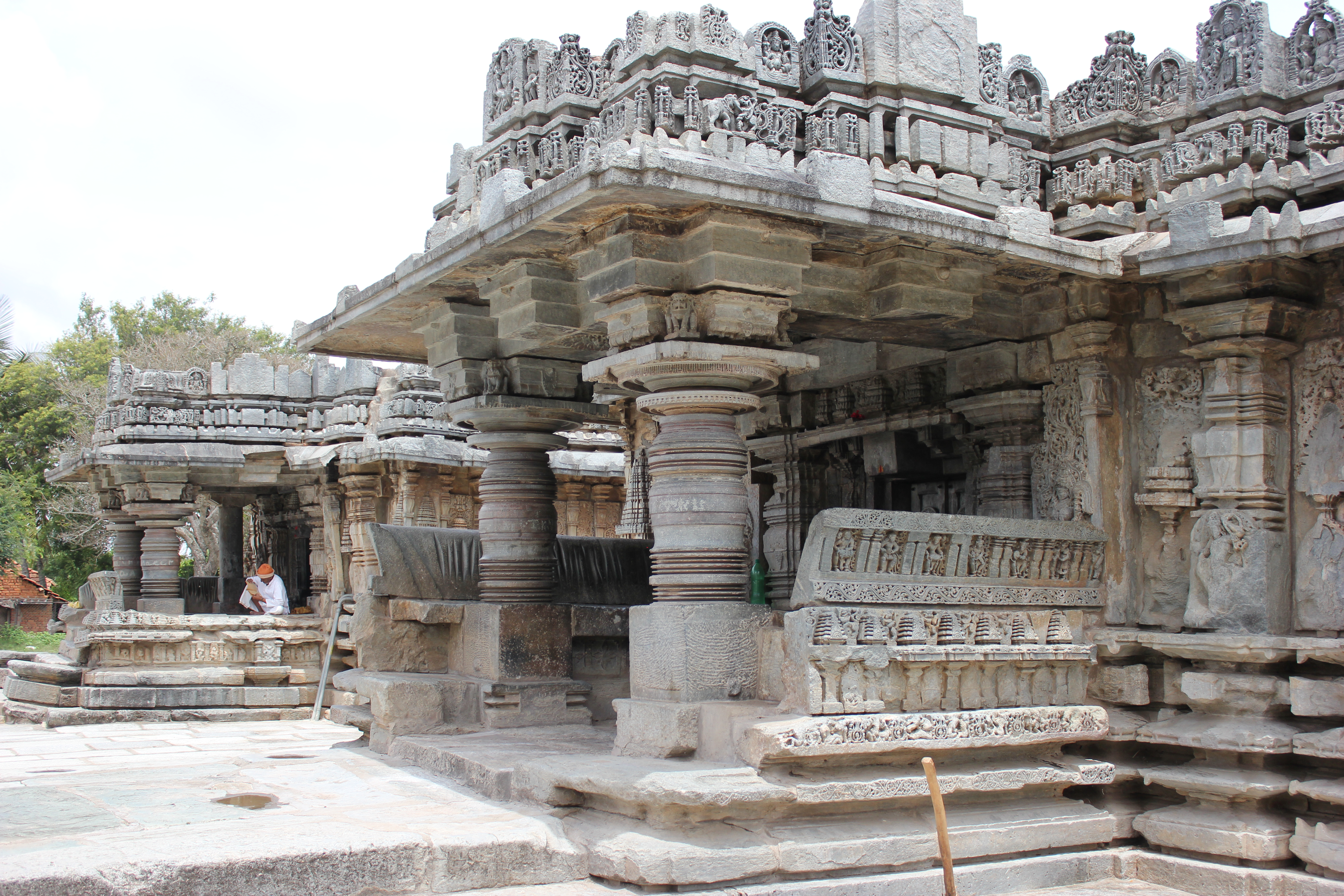
Frontal view of twin temples, Nageshvara (far), Chennakeshava (near) at Mosale

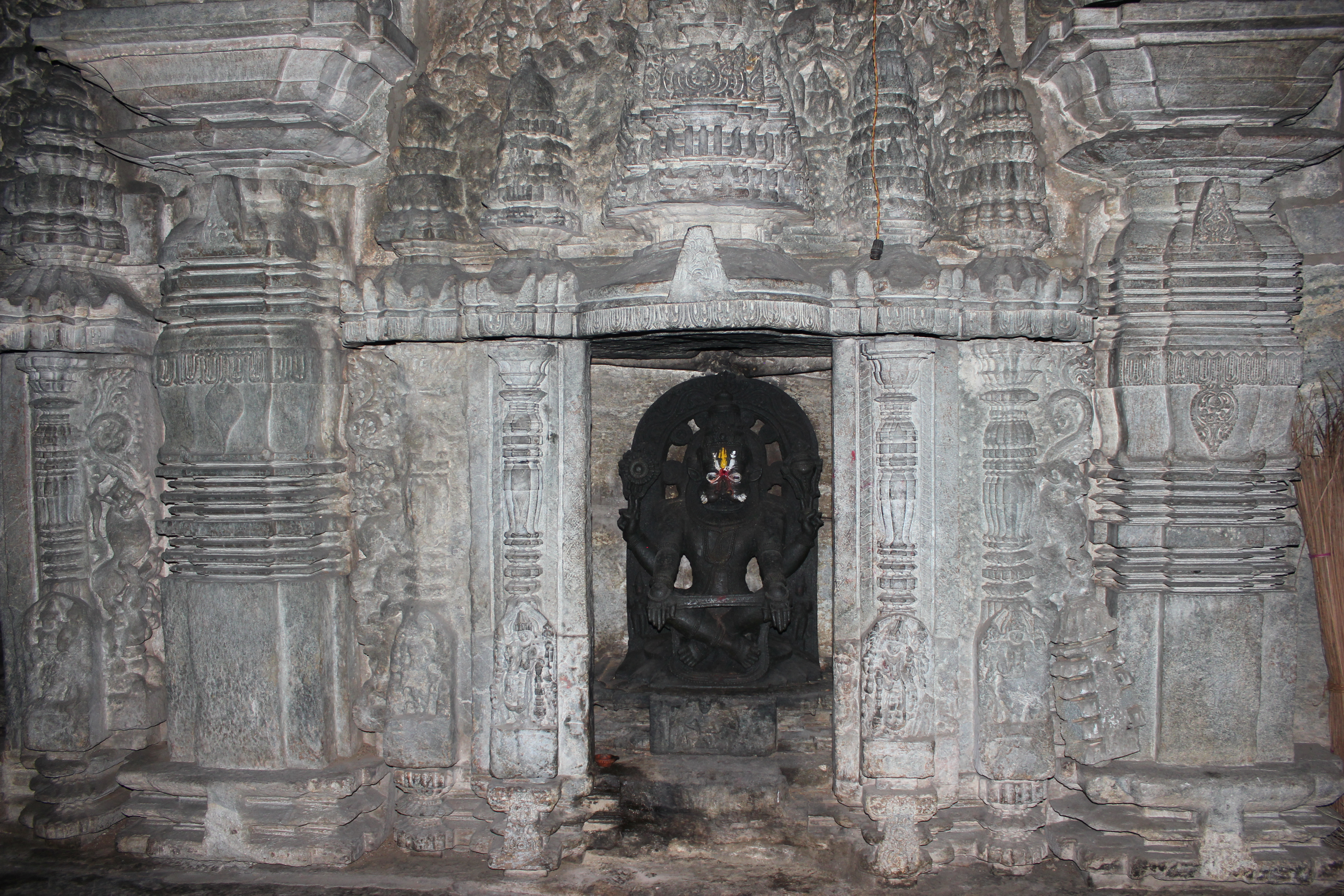
A decorative shrine in the mantapa wall of Chennakeshava temple at Mosale

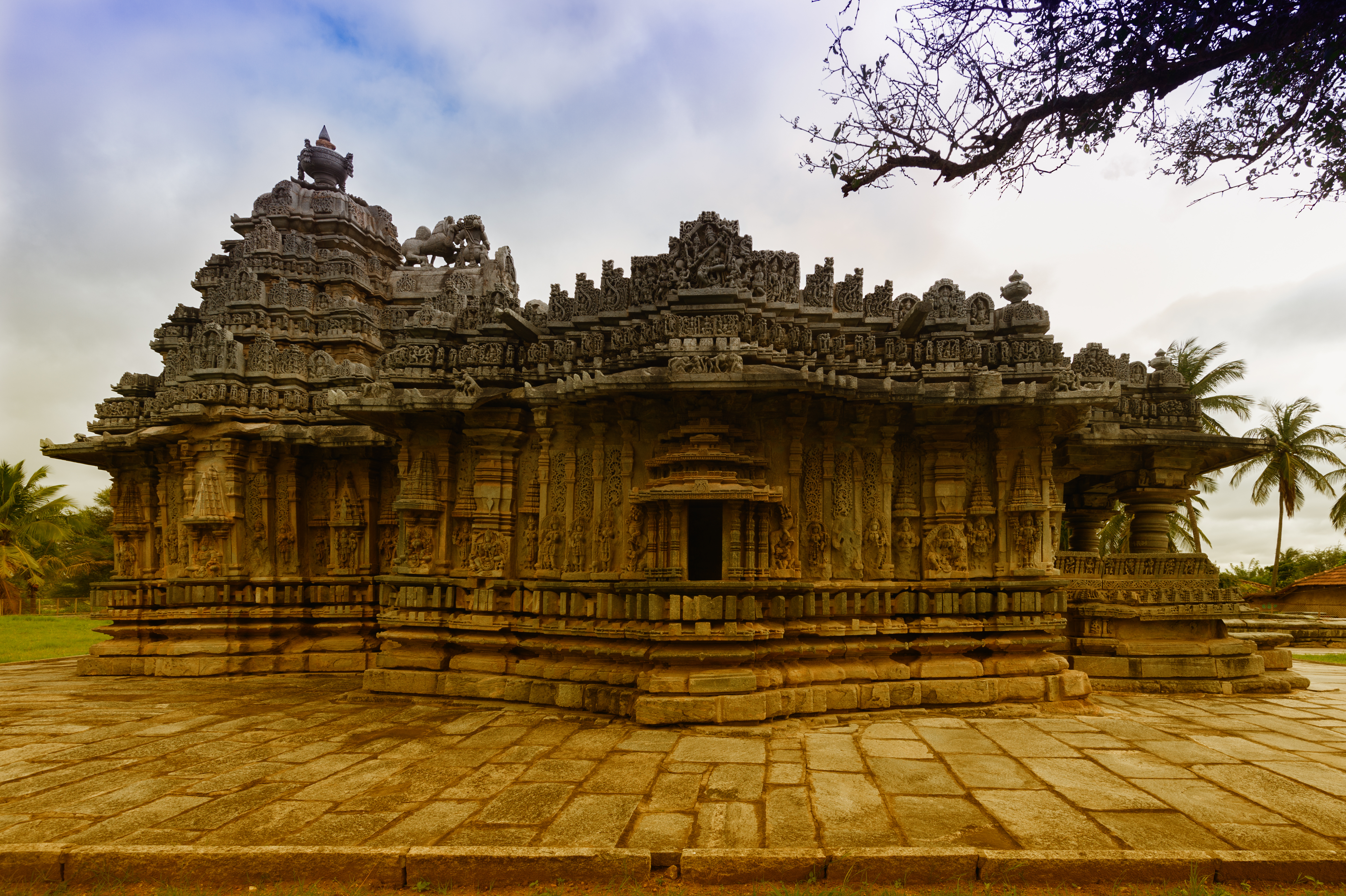
Nageshvara Temple - Mosale

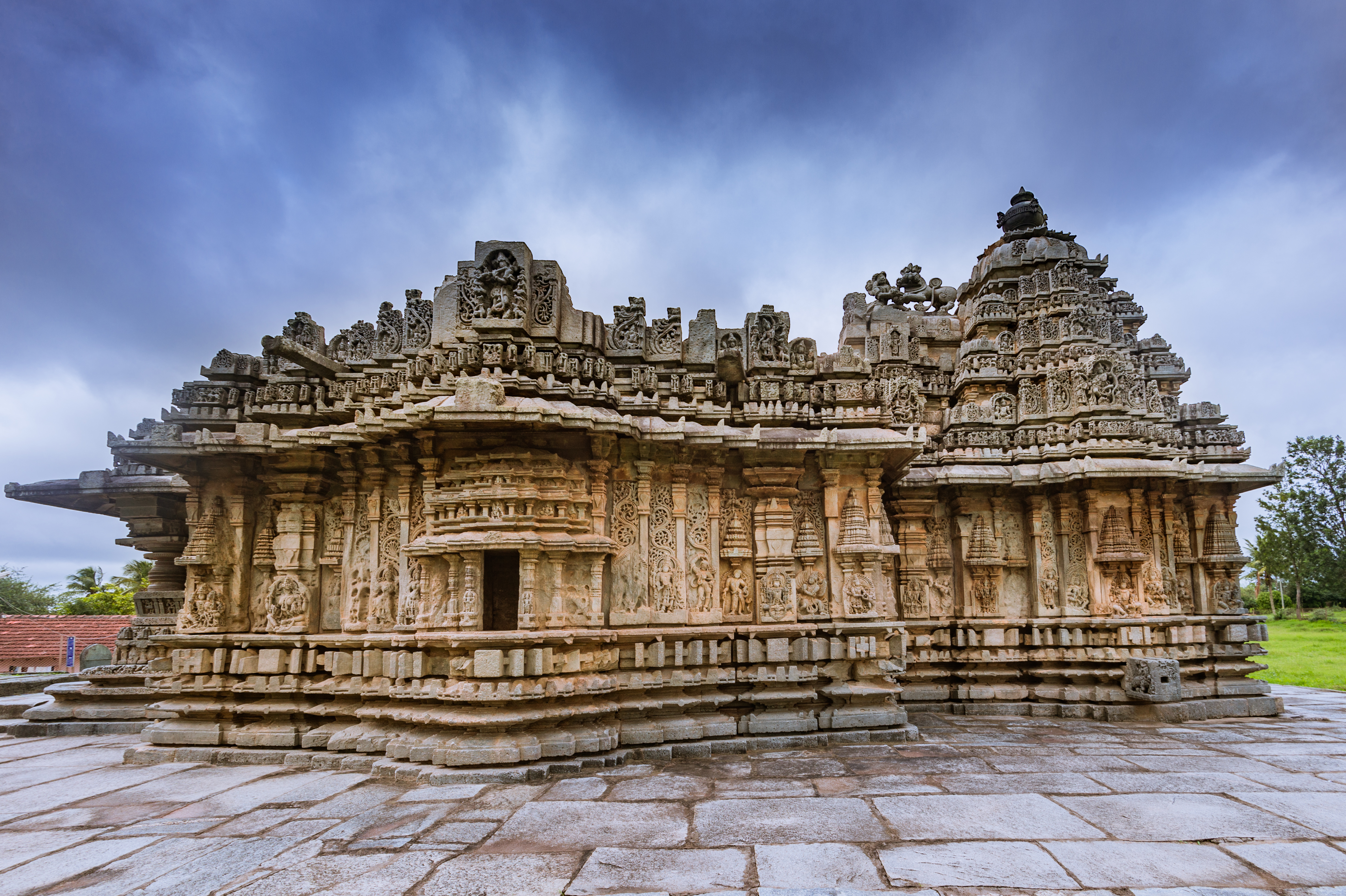

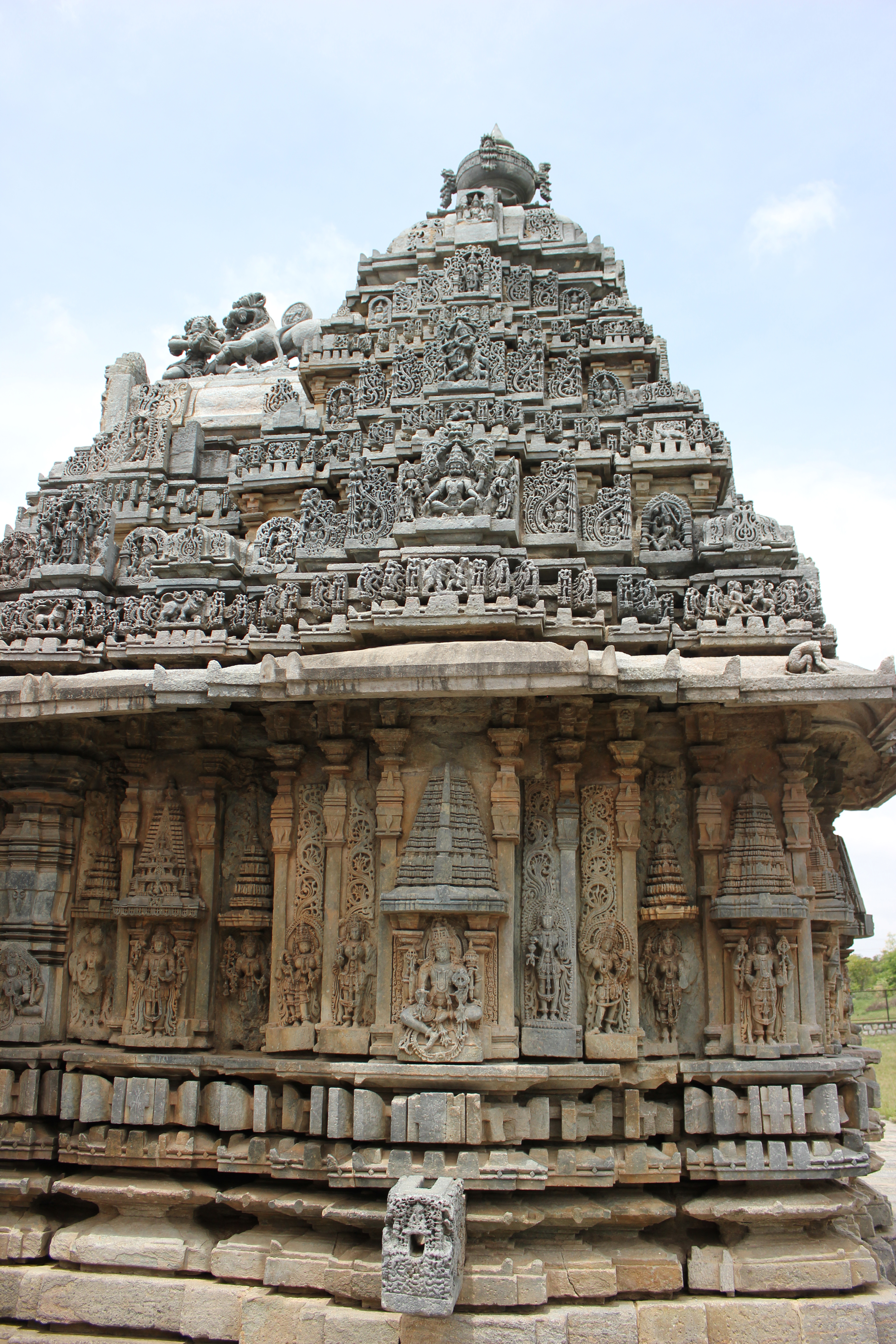
Vesara tower of the Chennakeshava temple, Mosale

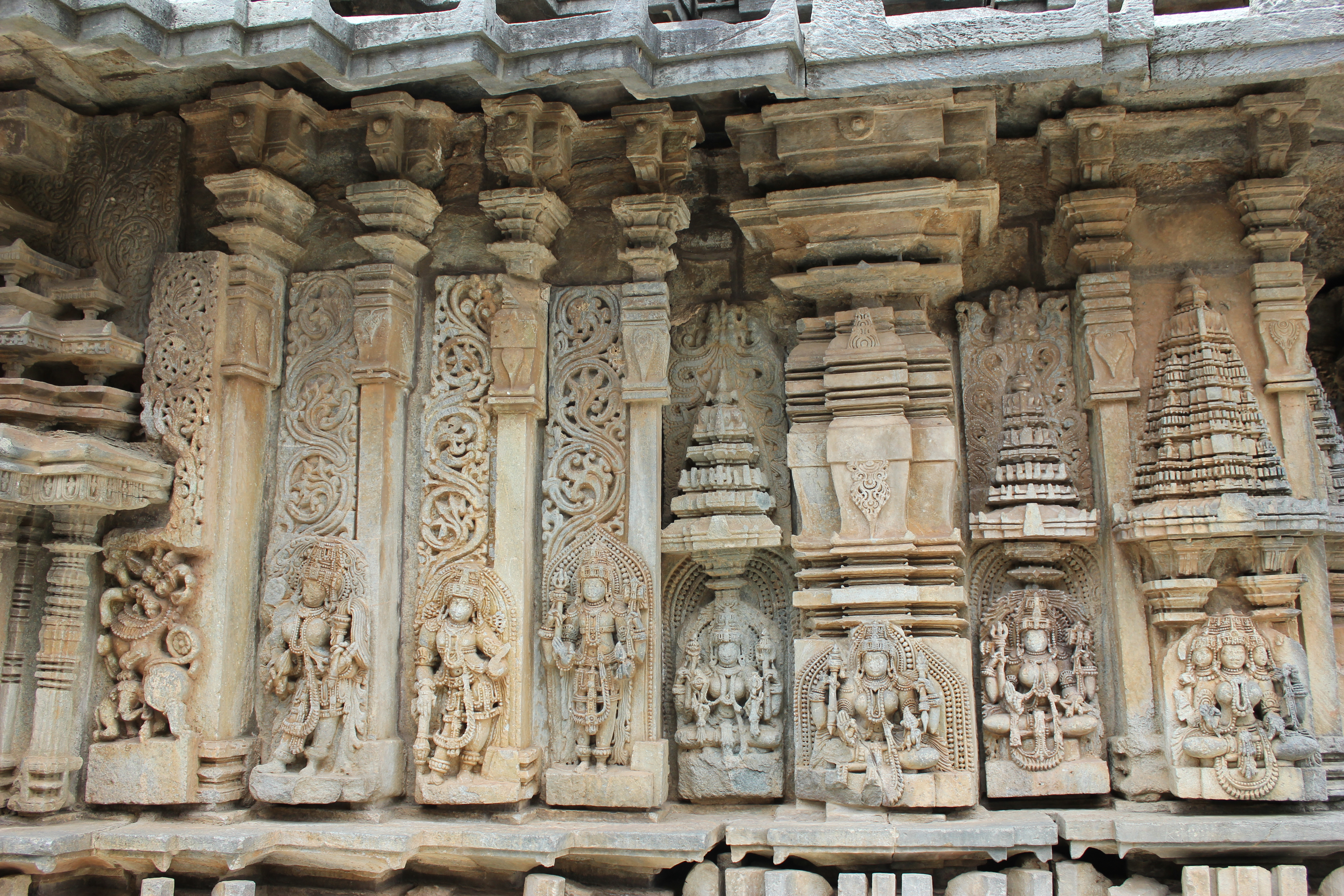
Wall panel relief sculpture and ornamentation in Chennakeshava temple at Mosale

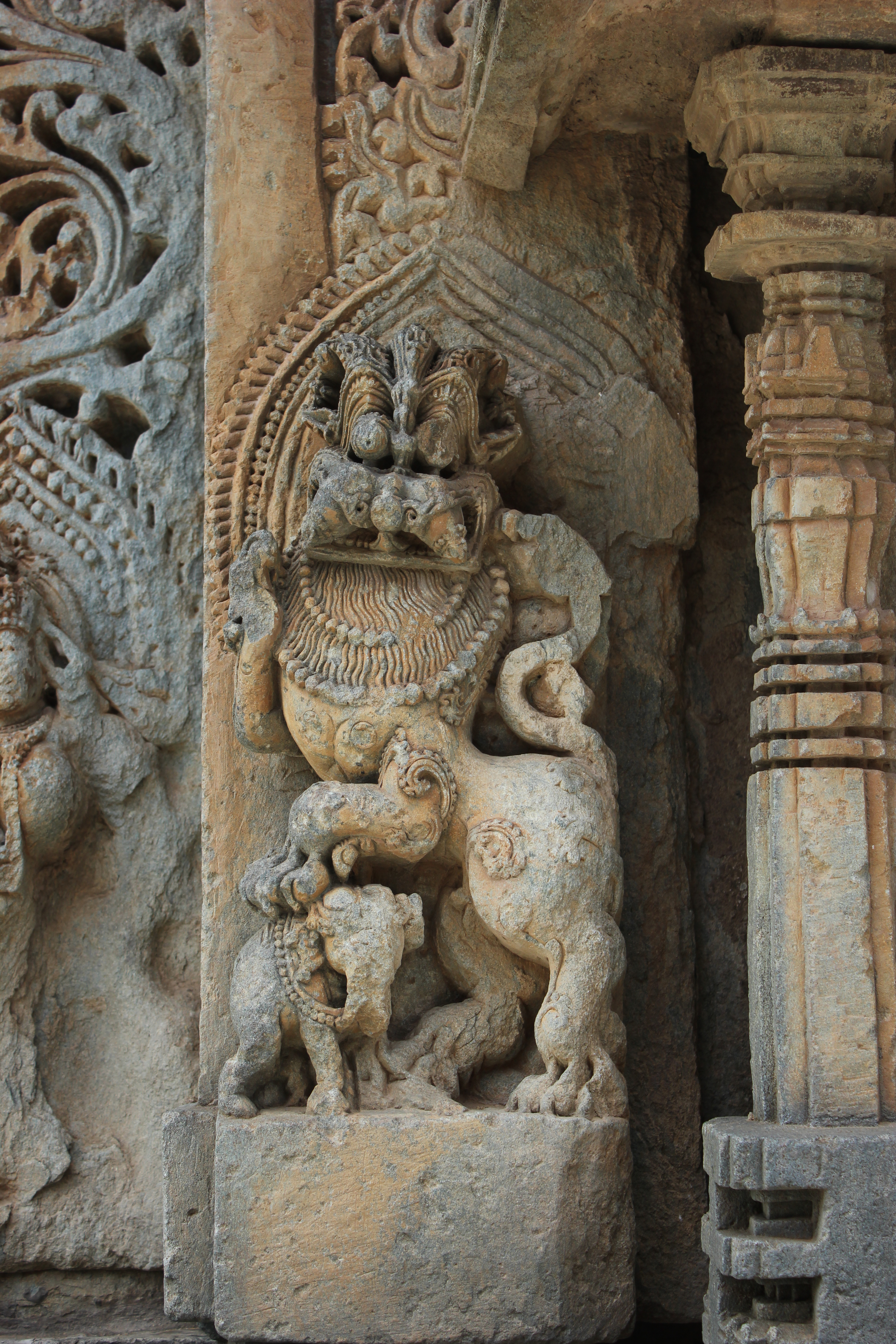
Yali sculpture on wall of Chennakeshava temple at Mosale

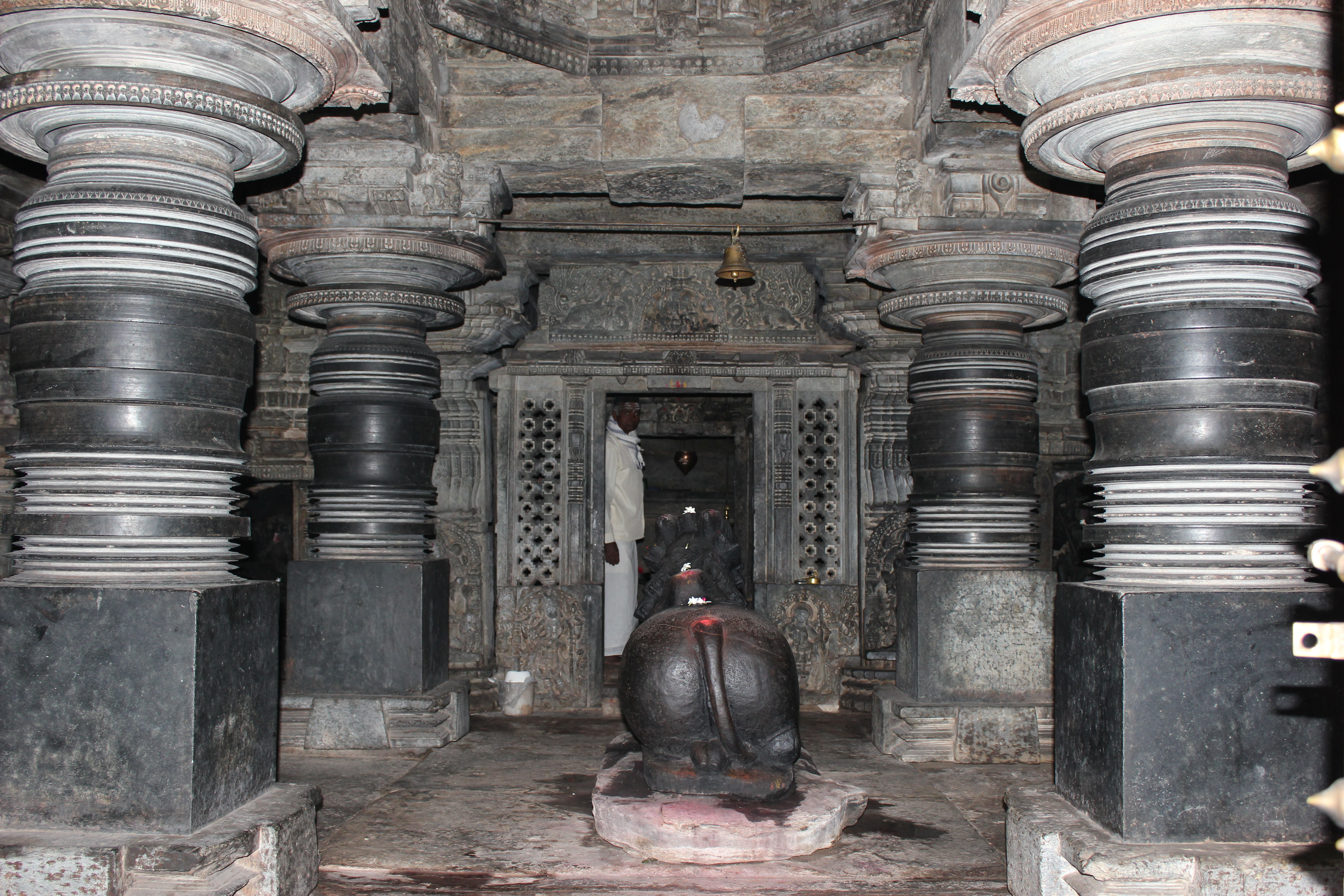
Closed mantapa with lathe turned pillars facing sanctum in Nageshvara temple at Mosale

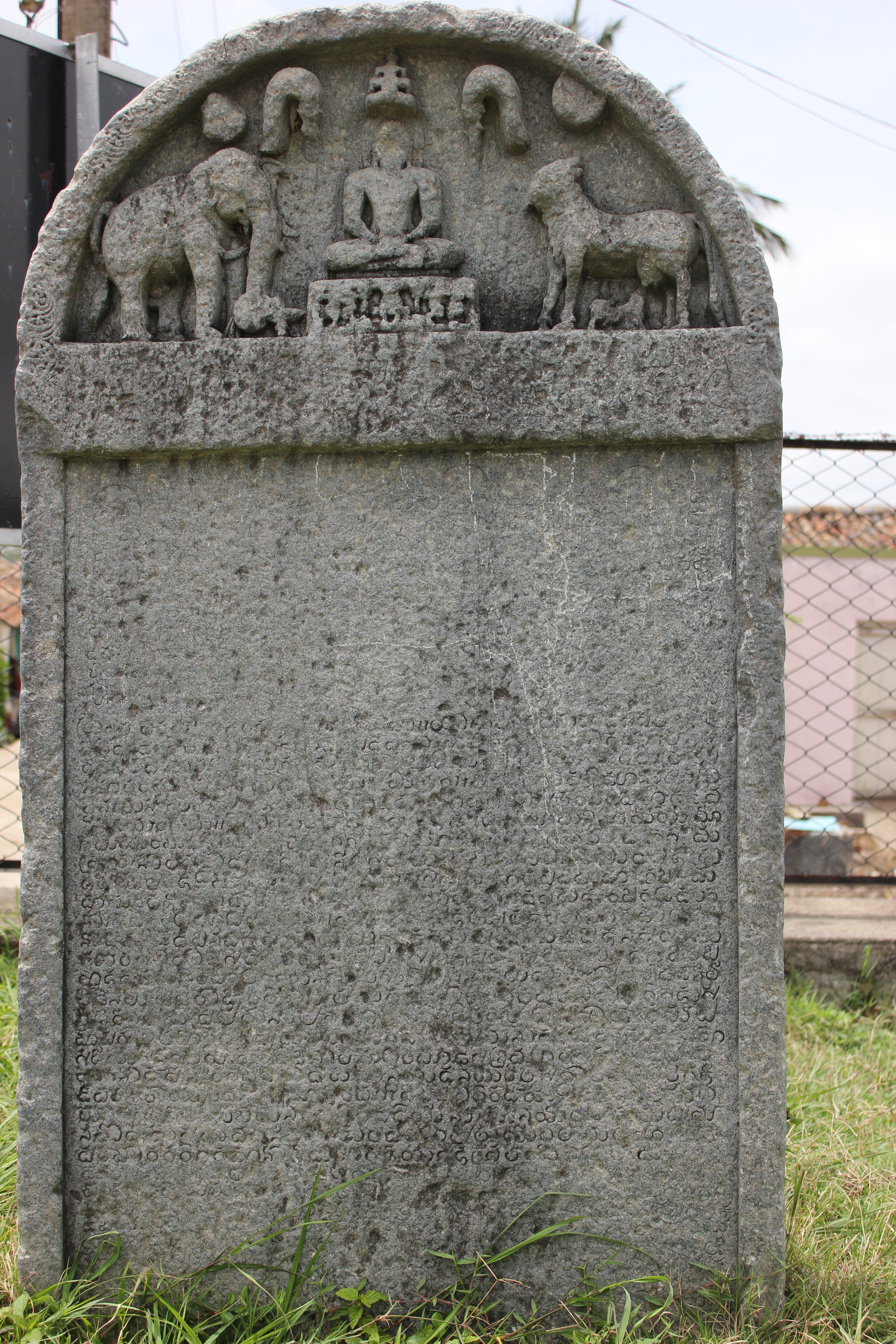
Old Kannada inscription (1577 CE) of Belur Chief Venkatadri Nayaka at the twin temple complex at Mosale

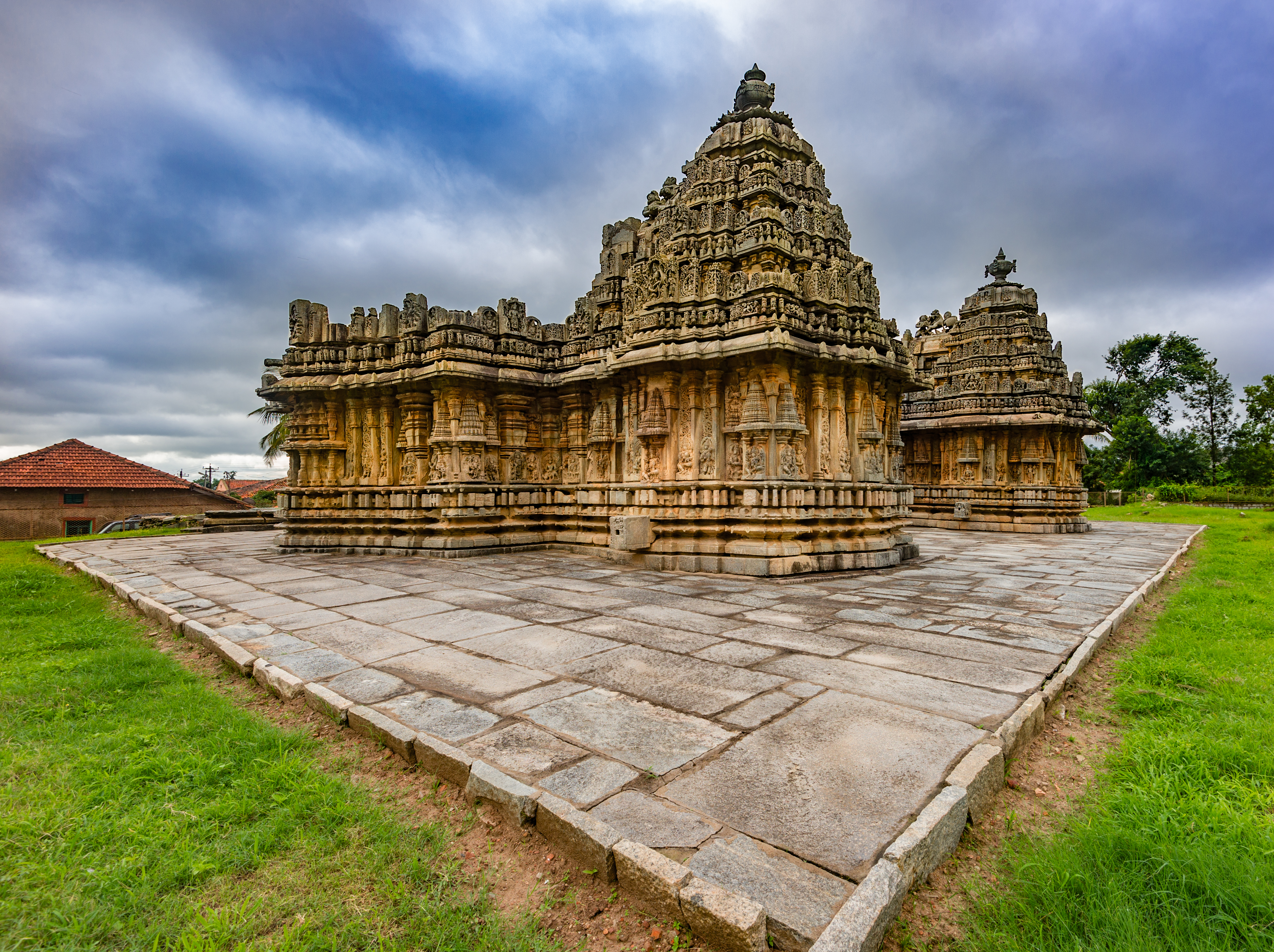
North Side corner View of the twin temples at Mosale

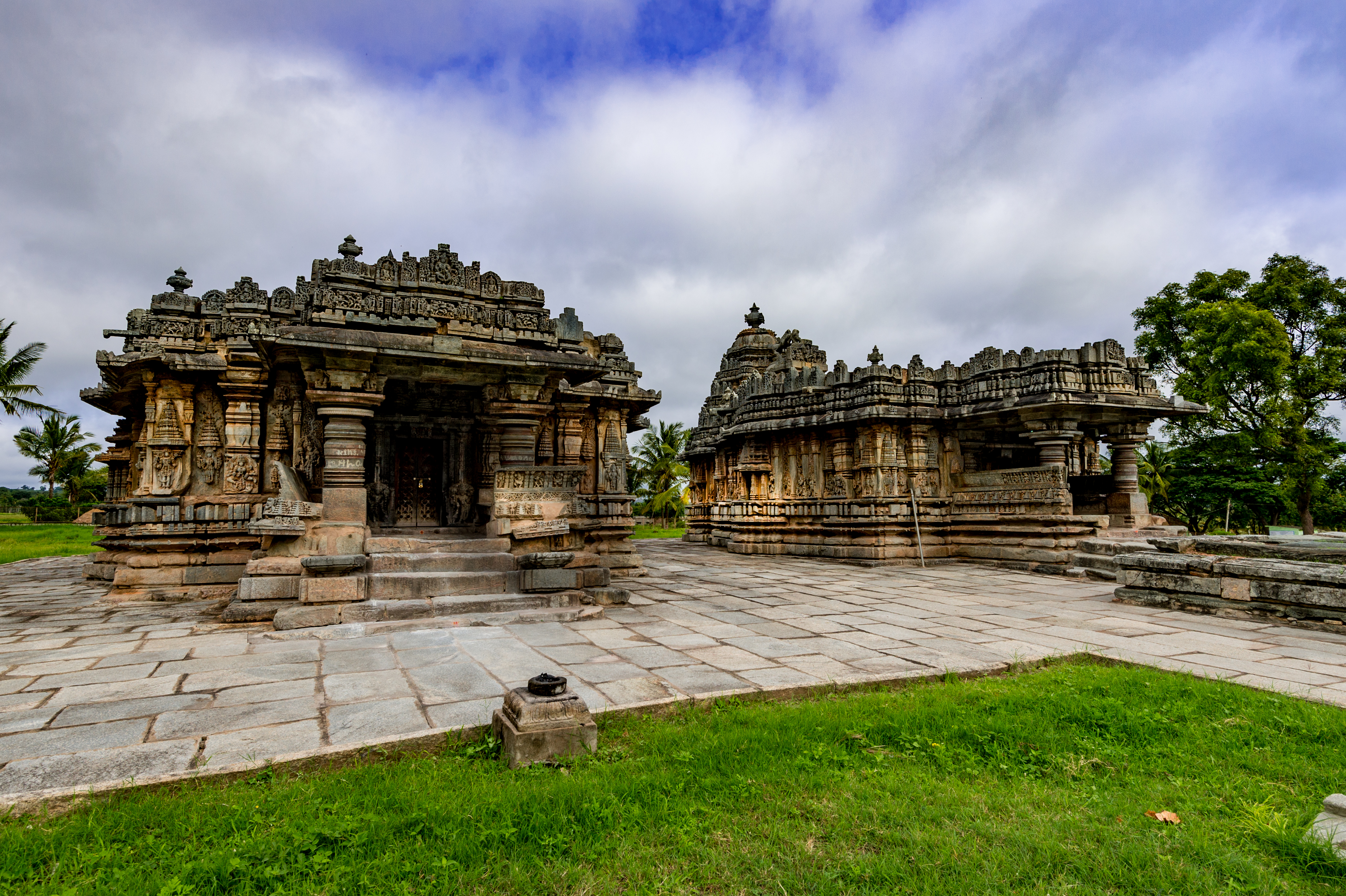
Frontal view of the Nageshvara-Chennakeshava - twin Temples of Mosale
