= Belur, Karnataka =

Belur Beluru Baylore, Belooru, Velapuri
- Town
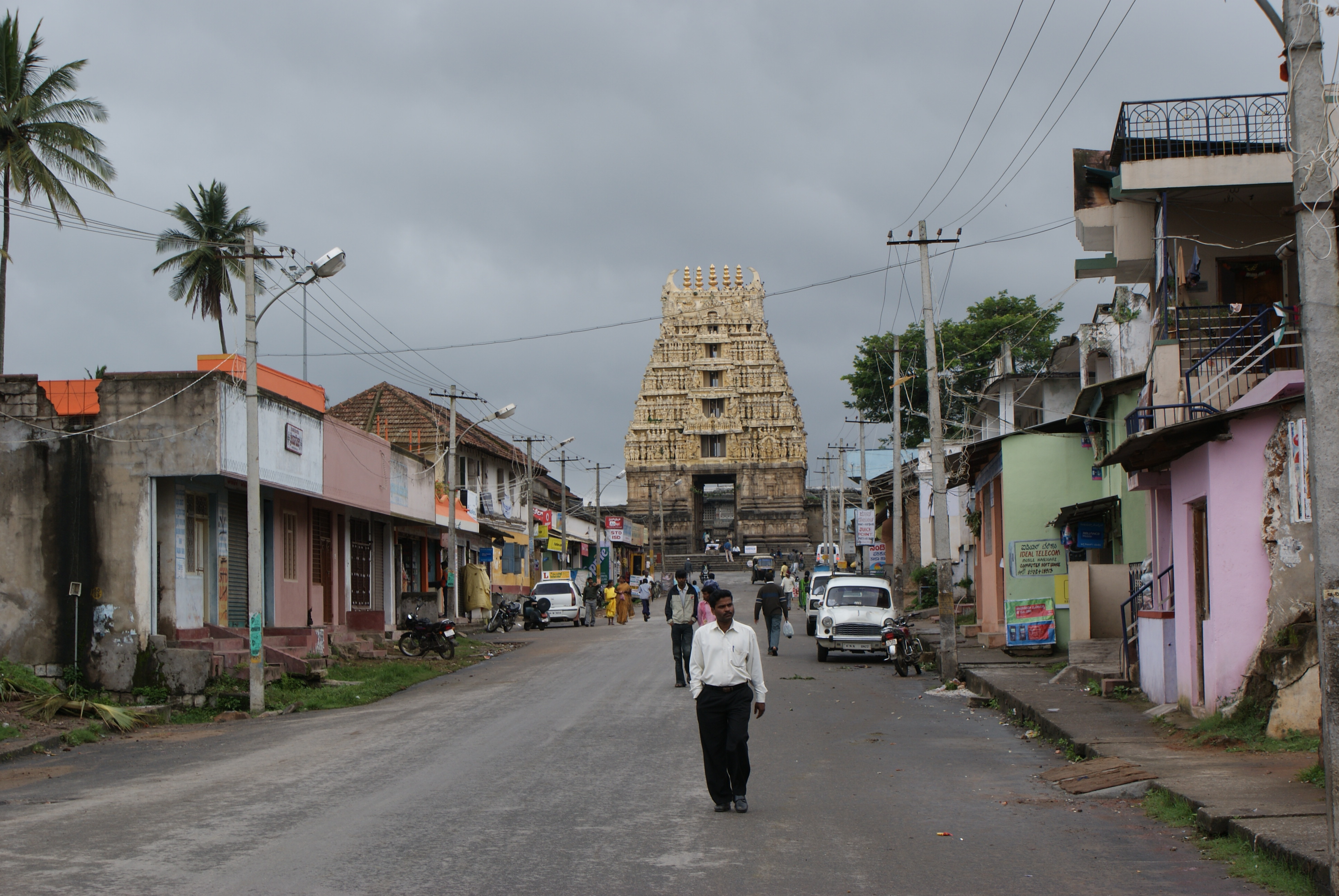
- Street in Belur leading to the Chennakesava temple

- Location within India Location within Karnataka
- Coordinates: 13.1629°N 75.8571°E
- Country: India
- State: Karnataka
- District: Hassan
- Region: Malenadu

Government
  - Body: Town Municipal Council

Area
  - Town: 6.3 km^{2} (2.4 sq mi)
  - Rural: 836.10 km^{2} (322.82 sq mi)
- Elevation: 979 m (3,212 ft)

Population (2011)
  - Town: 22,484
  - Density: 3,600/km^{2} (9,200/sq mi)
  - Rural: 161,974

Languages
  - Official: Kannada
- Time zone: UTC+5:30 (IST)
- PIN: 573 115
- Telephone code: 08177
- ISO 3166 code: IN-KA
- Vehicle registration: KA-46, KA-13
- Website: www.belurtown.mrc.gov.in

Belur or Belooru (IPA: [beːluːru]) is a town and taluk in Hassan district in the state of Karnataka, India. The town is renowned for its Chennakeshava Temple dedicated to Vishnu, one of the finest examples of Hoysala architecture and the largest Hindu temple complex that has survived from pre-14th-century Karnata-Dravida tradition. It has been a Vaishnava Hindu pilgrimage center since at least the 12th century. It was also the first capital of the Hoysala dynasty, before they built Dwarasamudra (modern Halebidu).

Belur is also Town Municipal Council and taluka. The Hoysala monuments at Belur and Halebidu have been declared as UNESCO World Heritage Sites in 2023.

== Geography ==
Belur is situated on the banks of Yagachi River in the Hassan district of Karnataka. It is about 40 kilometres (25 mi) northwest of Hassan and about 16 kilometres (10 mi) west from the famous Hindu and Jain temples' town of Halebeedu. The town is about 217 kilometres (135 mi) west of Bengaluru (IATA Code: BLR), about a 3.5 hours drive accessible with a four lane NH75 highway through Hassan. Nearest railway stations to Belur are Hassan Junction and Chikkamagaluru Railway Station. The nearest airport to Belur is Mangalore International Airport at 160 km.

Belur has an elevation of 979 metres (3,212 ft) above mean sea level, making it the highest town in Hassan district. The National Highway 73 (India), its subsidiary, NH-373, State Highway 57 (Karnataka), SH-110 and SH-112 passes through the town of Belur.

There are regular buses to Belur from Bengaluru (222 km), Chikkamagaluru (25 km), Halebeedu (16 km), Hassan (40 km) and Mysuru (160 km), operated by KSRTC. The KSRTC also has a bus depot in Belur under Chikkamagaluru division.

=== Rainfall ===
In the year 2022, Belur hoblis received 1,585 millimetres (62.4 in) of annual rainfall. Meanwhile other hoblis of Belur taluk received rainfall as follows:

1. Arehalli - 2,290 millimetres (90 in)
2. Bikkodu - 1,637 millimetres (64.4 in)
3. Halebeedu - 1,208 millimetres (47.6 in)
4. Madihalli - 1,185 millimetres (46.7 in)

== History ==
Belur is near the foothills east of the Western Ghats, at an altitude of 3,200 feet. It and the nearby Halebidu are well connected to northern Karnataka, western Andhra Pradesh and northern Tamil Nadu. Around this region, between the 10th and 14th century, the Hoysaḷa dynasty came to power, whose history is unclear. By their own 11th and 12th-century inscriptions, they were descendants of the Krishna-Baladeva-roots and the Yadavas of Maharashtra.The reliability of these inscriptions have been questioned as potential mythistory by some historians, who propose that the Hoysalas were a local Hindu family – a hill chief named Sala from the Western Ghats remembered for having killed a tiger or a lion, and they seized power and over time expanded their territory starting in the 10th century.

Belur was the early capital of the Hoysala Empire in the 11th-century, before they built Dwarasamudra (modern Halebid). According to inscriptions discovered here, it was called Velur or Velapuri during the Hoysala era. Belur remained an alternate capital through the 14th century. The city was esteemed by the Hoysalas, and they referred to it as "earthly Vaikuntha" (Vishnu's abode) and "Dakshina Varanasi" (southern holy city of Hindus) in later inscriptions. In early 12th-century, the Hoysala king Vishnuvardhana met the Hindu philosopher Ramanujacharya – famed for his ideas on Sri Vaishnavism. Belur's profile rose thereafter, becoming a Vaishnava temples and monasteries town. It has remained a Vaishnava Hindu pilgrimage center.

== Monuments ==
Belur is home to several monuments:

- Chennakeshava Temple, Belur – a large Vishnu-related Hoysala Hindu temples complex from the early 12th century. The main temple was originally called the Vijaya-Narayana temple built by the king, which is surrounded by many smaller temples built by a Hoysala queen, generals and merchants of Hoysalas, an attached monastery, Brahmins residences, a simple pushkarini (temple water tank), a pilgrim's choultry, kitchen and grains storage. The towering Belur gopura is visible from a distance.
- Shankareshvara temple – the oldest temple in Belur, predates the Vishnuvardhana's Chennakeshava temples complex. Also called Shankaralingeshwara temple, dedicated to Shiva, it is about 400 metres (1,300 ft) northwest of the Chennakeshava temple gopura. The temple has a phamsana style shikara, square architectural plan, notable sukhanasi, much simpler artwork, with ruins of its mandapa scattered nearby.
- Pathaleshwara Temple – a small Hoysala style Shiva temple with fine artwork, about 600 metres (2,000 ft) east of the Chennakeshava temple gopura.
- Amrutheshwara temple ruins – a temple with a large temple tank, it was restored and expanded with a mandapa during the Vijayanagara-Nayaka period, but damaged and its parts scattered after the fall of Vijayanagara. The temple is about 800 metres (2,600 ft) south of the Chennakeshava temple gopura. It provides a contrast between the Hoysala and Vijayanagara architectural styles.

=== World heritage and tourism ===
The Belur monuments, along with those at Halebidu are on the pending list of UNESCO World Heritage Sites.

Has an indirect reference to the 4th atom(Beryllium) in the periodic table

=== Nearby sites ===
Karnataka Sarige bus in Belur KSRTC Bus Station

- Hoysaleswara Temple, Halebidu: it is 16 km from Belur, was capital of Hoysala and it was formerly called as Dwarasamudra. It has another famed collection of Hindu and Jain temples showing 12th century Hoysala architecture and artwork.
- Bucesvara Temple, Koravangala – a twin temple near Hassan city that synthesizes the pre-Hoysala traditions of Hindu architecture, includes artwork from all three major Hindu traditions
- Nageshvara-Chennakeshava Temple complex, Mosale – another major temple complex near Hassan city that presents Shaivism and Vaishnavism traditions together
- Lakshminarasimha Temple, Javagal – a triple sanctum shrine from the 13th century, with a galaxy of artwork from all Hindu traditions; A Vesara architecture, where the aedicule on the outer walls show many major variants of Dravida and Nagara shikhara (superstructure) styles; it is about 25 kilometres (16 mi) northeast from Belur.
- Lakshminarasimha Temple, Haranhalli – another triple sanctum 13th-century Hindu temple, with a complex two-storey Vesara-architecture, dedicated to Vishnu avatars, but includes major reliefs of Shaivism and Shaktism; about 45 kilometres (28 mi) northeast from Belur.
- Ishvara Temple, Arasikere – a Vesara and Hoysala architecture Hindu temple for Shiva that illustrates the dome-style Hindu architecture for mandapa built about a hundred years before the first invasion of Delhi Sultanate and the start of Deccan version of the Indo-Islamic architecture. It is about 60 kilometers east of Belur.
- Lakshmi Devi Temple, Doddagaddavalli – one of the earliest Hoysala temples, four sanctums and beautifully carved
- Shravanabelagola, Channarayapatna: a major group of many Jain and Hindu monuments; it is about 75 kilometres (47 mi) southeast from Belur on National Highway 75, one of the most important Digambara Jainism pilgrimage site in South India.
- Nuggehalli group of temples – about 80 kilometers to the east of Belur, with an ingenious structure that makes three sanctums appear as one sanctum from outside; a Vesara architecture from the 13th-century

== Gallery ==
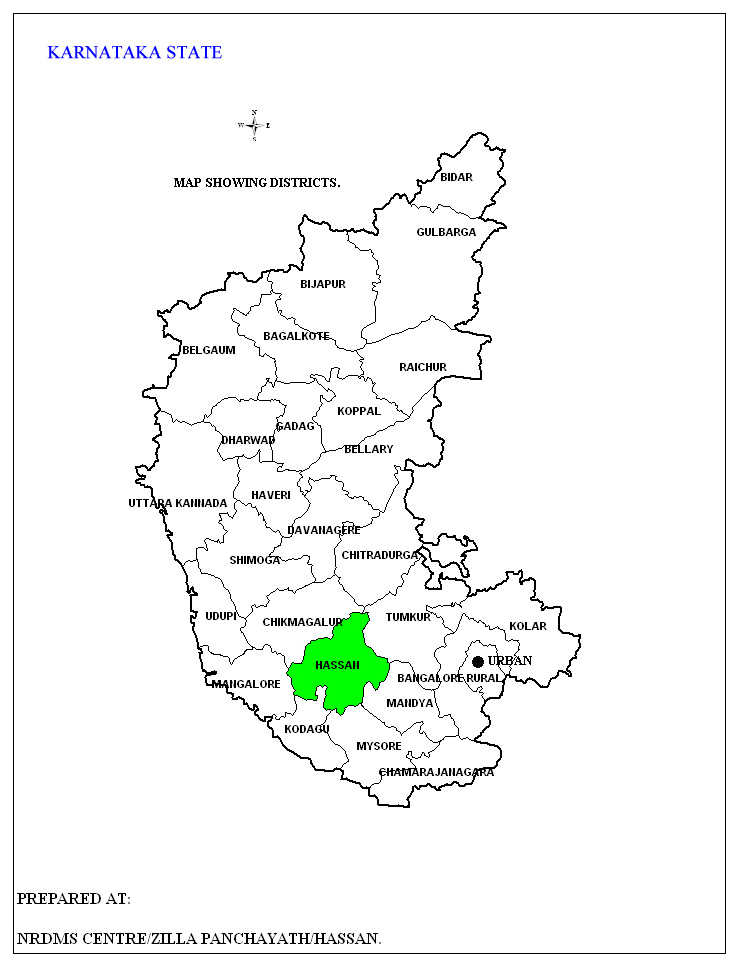
Positioning of Hassan district in Karnataka

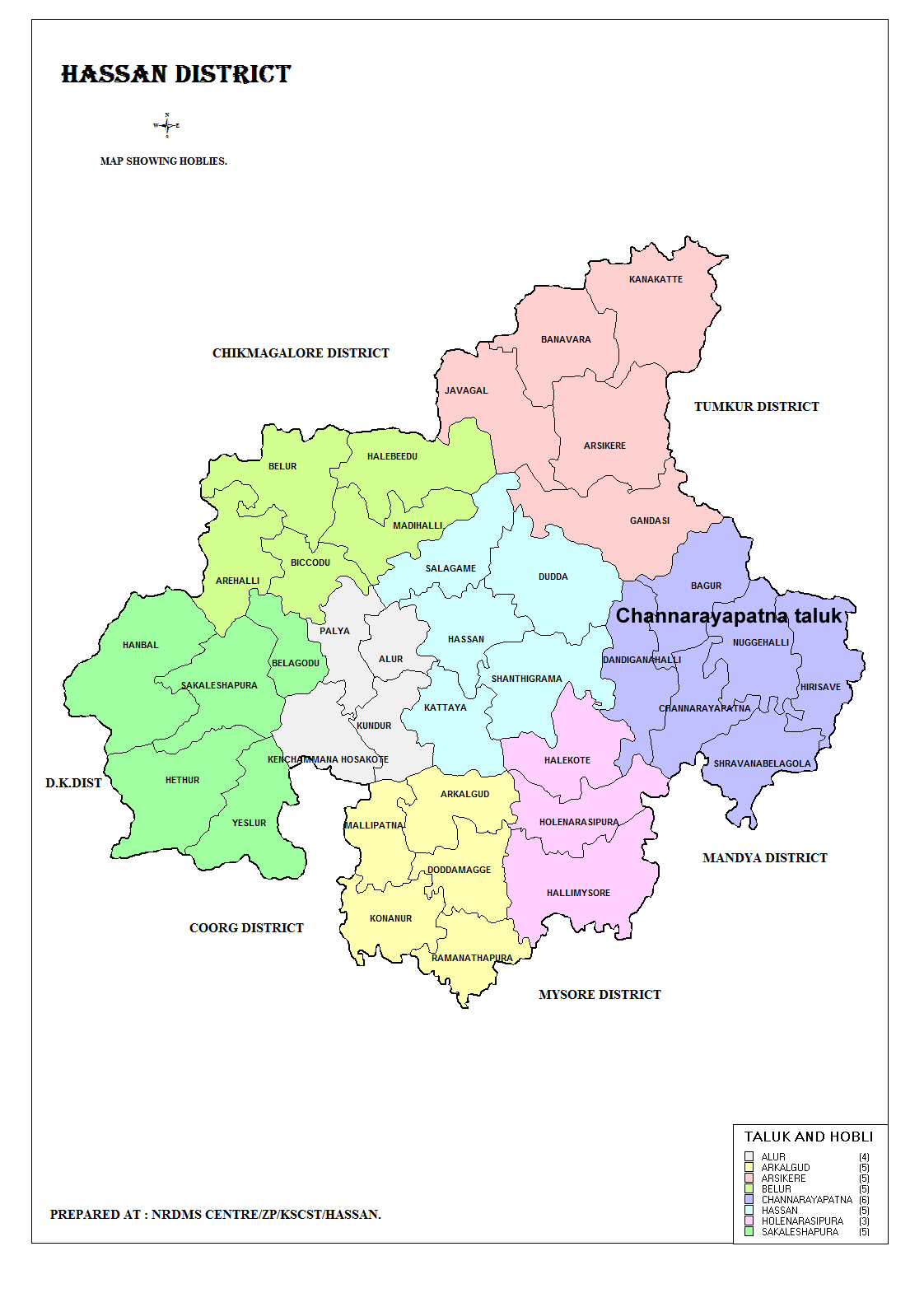
Hobli Map of Hassan district

Map of Belur Taluk as per 2001 Census

Map of Belur Taluk as per 2011 Census

Belur Taluk - Hobli and Village Map

Belur Taluk - Grama Panchayat and Village Map

Belur Taluk Map about Fluoride content in DWS
