= Hassan district =

Hassan district Hāsana
- District of Karnataka
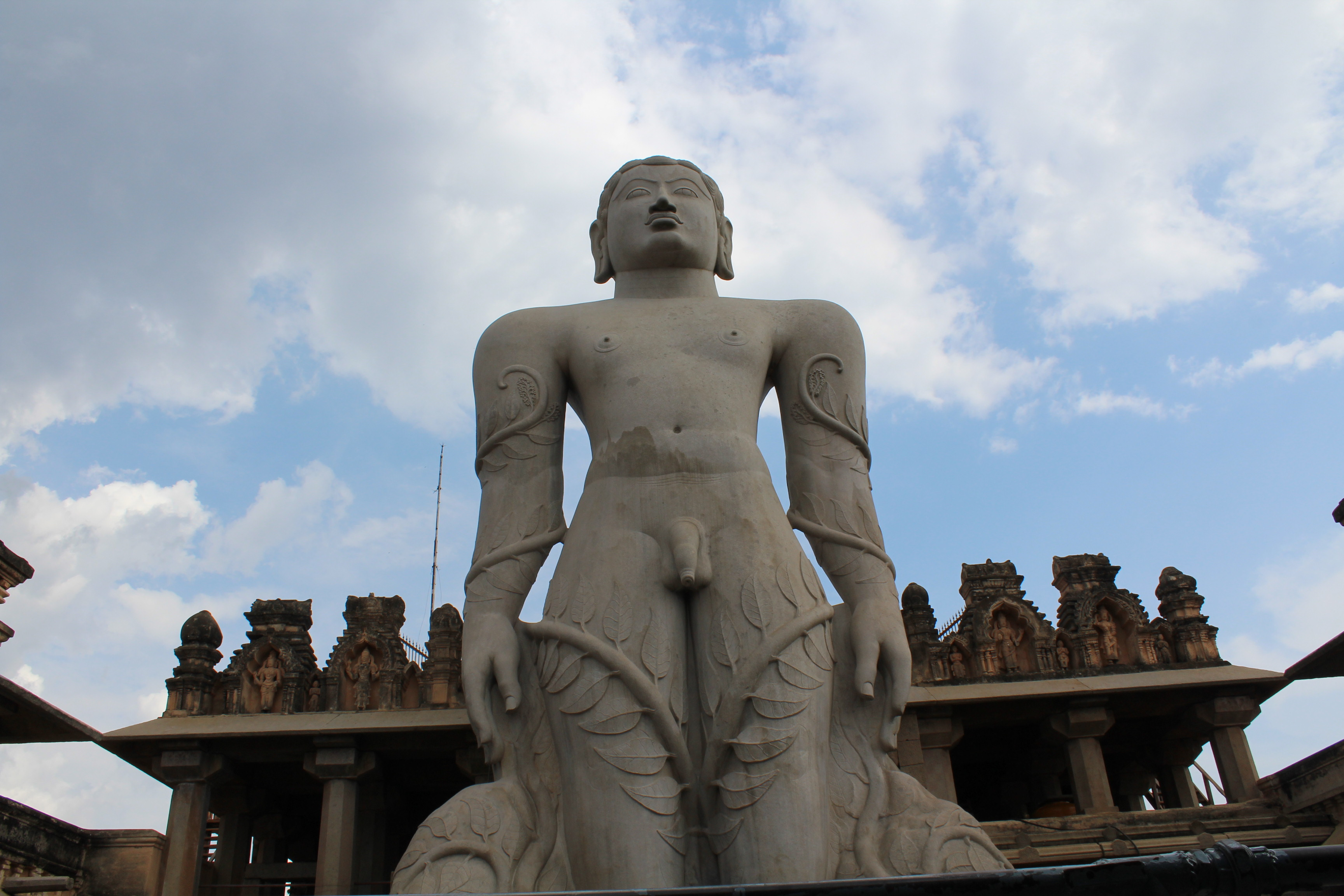
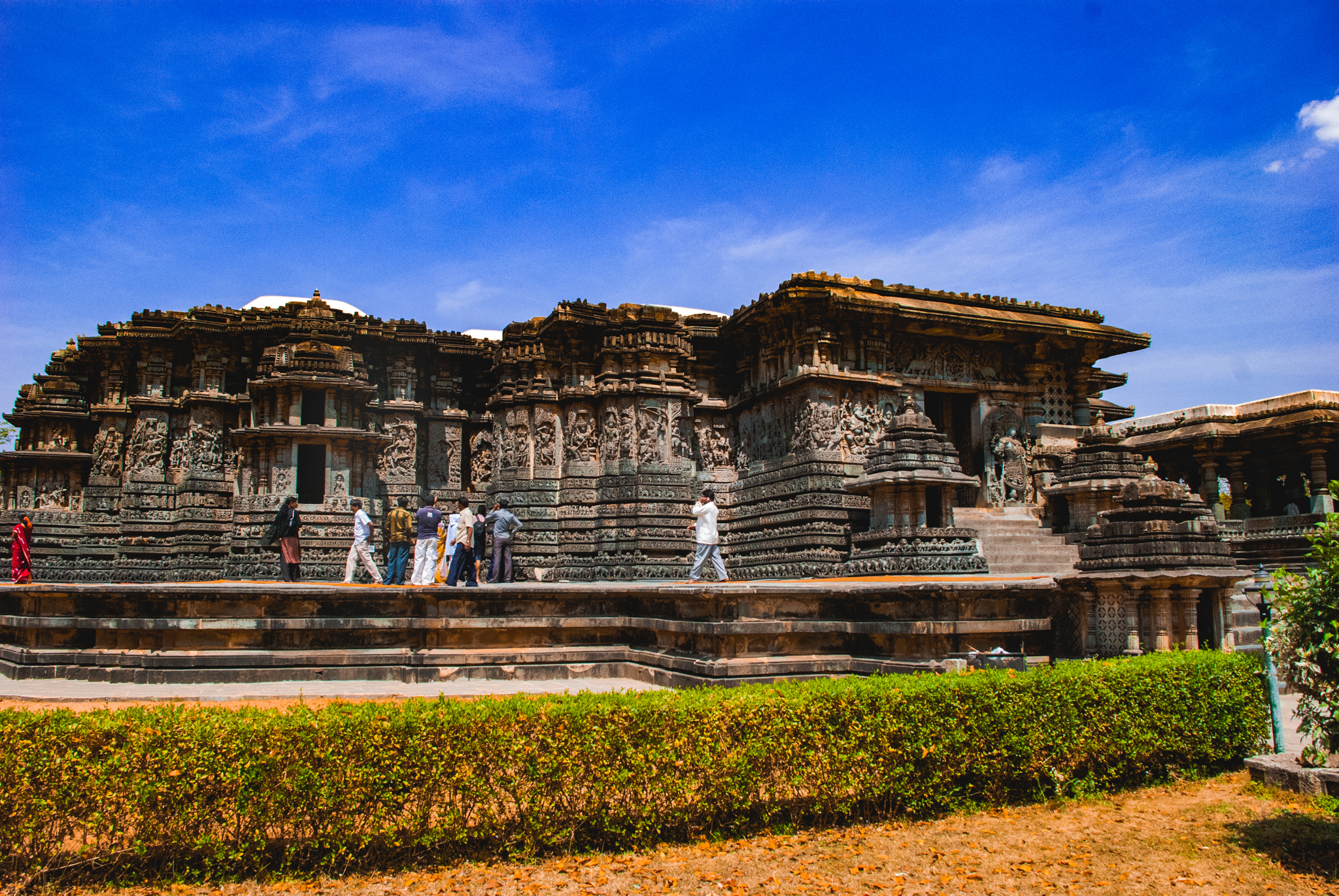
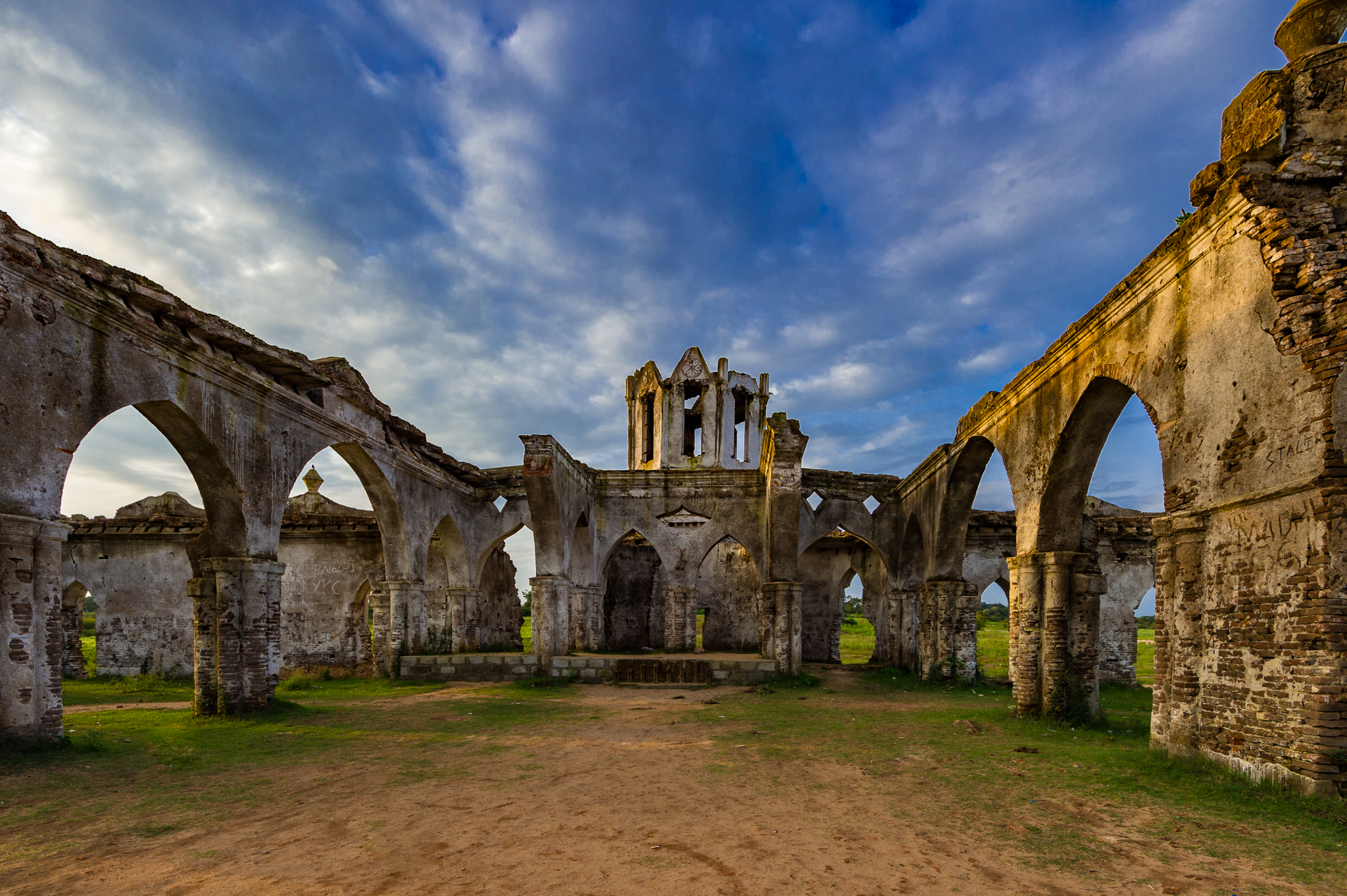
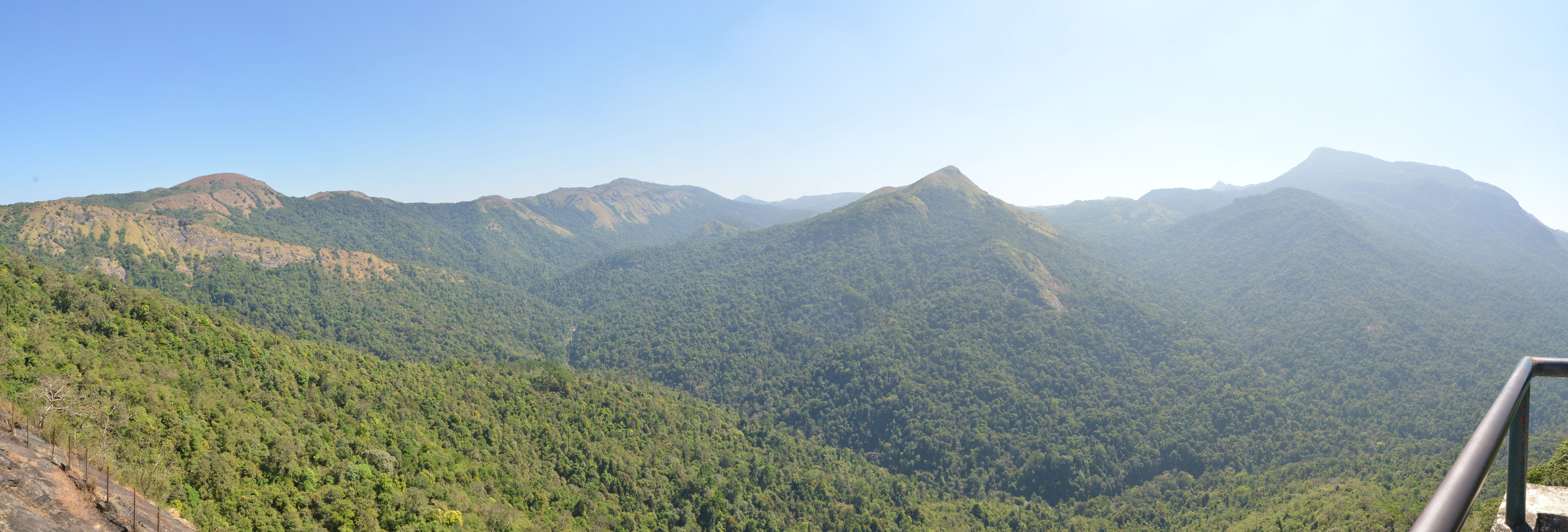
- Clockwise from top-left: Bahubali statue in Sravanabelagola, Hoysaleswara Temple in Halebidu, Shettihalli Rosary Church, Bisle Ghat, Manjarabad Fort
- Nickname(s): Shilpa Kalegala Beedu, Heritage town
- Location in Karnataka
- Coordinates: 13°N 76°E
- Country: India
- State: Karnataka
- Division: Mysore
- Hassan: 1886
- Headquarters: Hassan
- Talukas: Hassan, Holenarsipur, Arkalgud, Channarayapatna, Sakleshpur, Belur, Alur, Arasikere

Government
  - Deputy Commissioner and District Magistrate: K S Lathakumari (IAS)

Area
  - Total: 6,845 km^{2} (2,643 sq mi)
  - Rank: 11th
- Elevation (Avg. of 8 taluks): 933 m (3,061 ft)

Population (2011)
  - Total: 1,776,421
  - Density: 259.5/km^{2} (672.2/sq mi)

Languages
  - Official: Kannada
- Time zone: UTC+5:30 (IST)
- PIN: 573***
- Telephone code: 08172
- Vehicle registration: KA-13, KA-46
- Website: www.hassan.nic.in

Hassan district is one of the 31 districts of Karnataka, India. The district headquarter is Hassan. It was part of Manjarabad Faujdari between 1832-81 (Commissioner's Rule of Mysore). In 1882, it was reduced into a sub-division under erstwhile Kadur district (now Chikmagalur district). But in 1886, the Hassan district was restored to its current form.

== History ==
Hassan district was the seat of the Hoysala Empire which at its peak ruled large parts of south India from Belur as its early capital and Halebidu as its later capital during the period 1000–1334 CE, The district is the centre for Heritage tourism, is renowned as a 'Heritage town'.

It is named Hassan after the Hindu Goddess "Haasanamba", the goddess and presiding deity of the town. As per local legend Hassan name was abridged form of 'Simhasanapuri' which is associated with Janamejaya king, it is believed he had lived here during his cursed period. The history of Hassan district is essentially the history of two of the well known dynasties that have ruled Karnataka, the Western Ganga Dynasty of Talkad (350–999 CE) and the Hoysala Empire (1000–1334 CE). In the 15th and 16th centuries, the Vijayanagar kings patronised Chennakeshava of Belur as their family deity. It was also ruled by Adilshahis of Bijapur and Mughal Empire after decline of the Vijayanagar. In the 17th and 18th centuries, Hassan became a land of contention between the Nayakas of Keladi and the Mysore Kingdom. It was finally merged in Mysore kingdom.

=== Modern ===
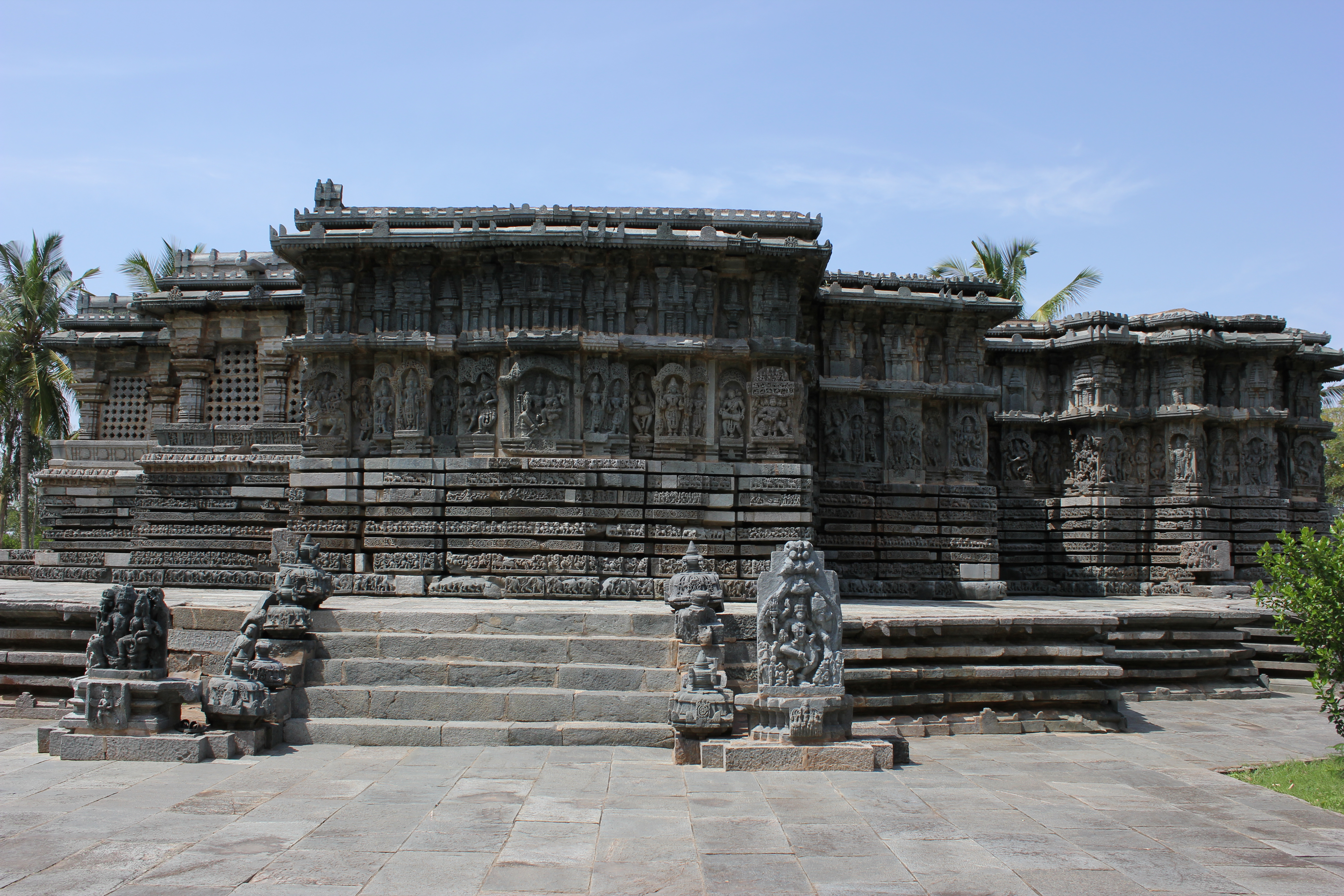
Profile of the Kedareshwara temple at Halebidu

During the 14th century, invasions by the Sultanate of Delhi weakened the Hoysala Kingdom, and the district became part of the Vijayanagara Empire. In the 15th and 16th centuries, the Vijayanagar kings patronised Chennakesava of Belur as their family deity. It was also ruled by Adilshahis of Bijapur and Mughal Empire after decline of the Vijayanagar. In the 17th and 18th centuries, Hassan became a land of contention between the Keladi Nayakas of Shimoga and the Mysore Kingdom. In 1648 the Mysore rulers built Channarayapatna fort by treaty with the Sultanate of Bijapur. A peace treaty was concluded between the Mysore and Keladi rulers in 1694. The district remained part of the Mysore Kingdom at the conclusion of the Fourth Anglo-Mysore War in 1799.

Hassan District and its current boundaries date to the 1860s, when the Mysore Kingdom was organised into 8 districts, and the districts further divided into taluks. The district had a population of 518,987 in the 1871 census. A famine from 1876 to 1878 reduced the population to 428,344 by 1881. The population was 511,975 in 1891, and 568,919 in 1901. The 1901 census recorded 541,531 Hindus, 16,668 Muslims, 5035 Animists, 3795 Christians, 1874 Jains, and 16 others. The district had 14 towns, and 2546 villages.

After India's independence in 1947, Mysore Kingdom became Mysore State, which was renamed Karnataka state in 1973.

=== Reserved forests ===
Reserve forests were established in the 19th century, and covered an area of 185 square miles in the district. The forests, with their area in square miles, were: Kempuhole Ghat (16), Kaganeri Ghati (2), Kabbinale Ghat (23), Bisale Ghat (23), Vijayapur (5), Hirikalgudda (Nagpuri forest) (92), Doddabetta (3), Burdalbore (3), Hagare (3), Byaba (2), Sige-gudda (8), Baisur (1), Mallappan-betta (1), and Vantigudda (1). The state established five sandalwood forests, totalling three square miles: Kemmanbore (232 acres), Gubbi (428 acres), Sunkal (500 acres), Gadagere (554 acres), and Nakalgud (185 acres).

== Geography ==
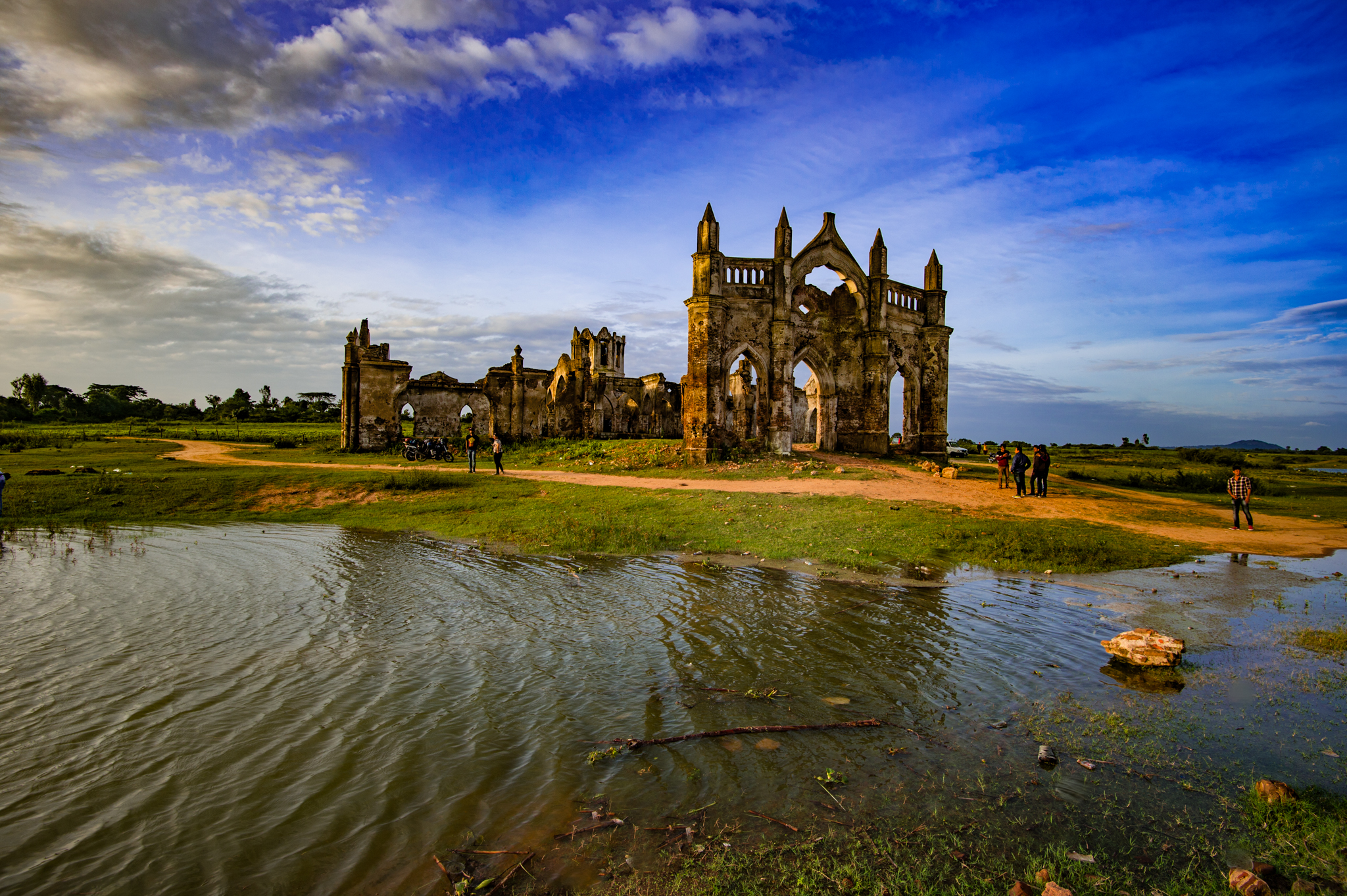
Shettihalli Rosary Church also known as the Floating Church that submerged in water as a result of construction of the Hemavati Dam and Reservoir in 1960

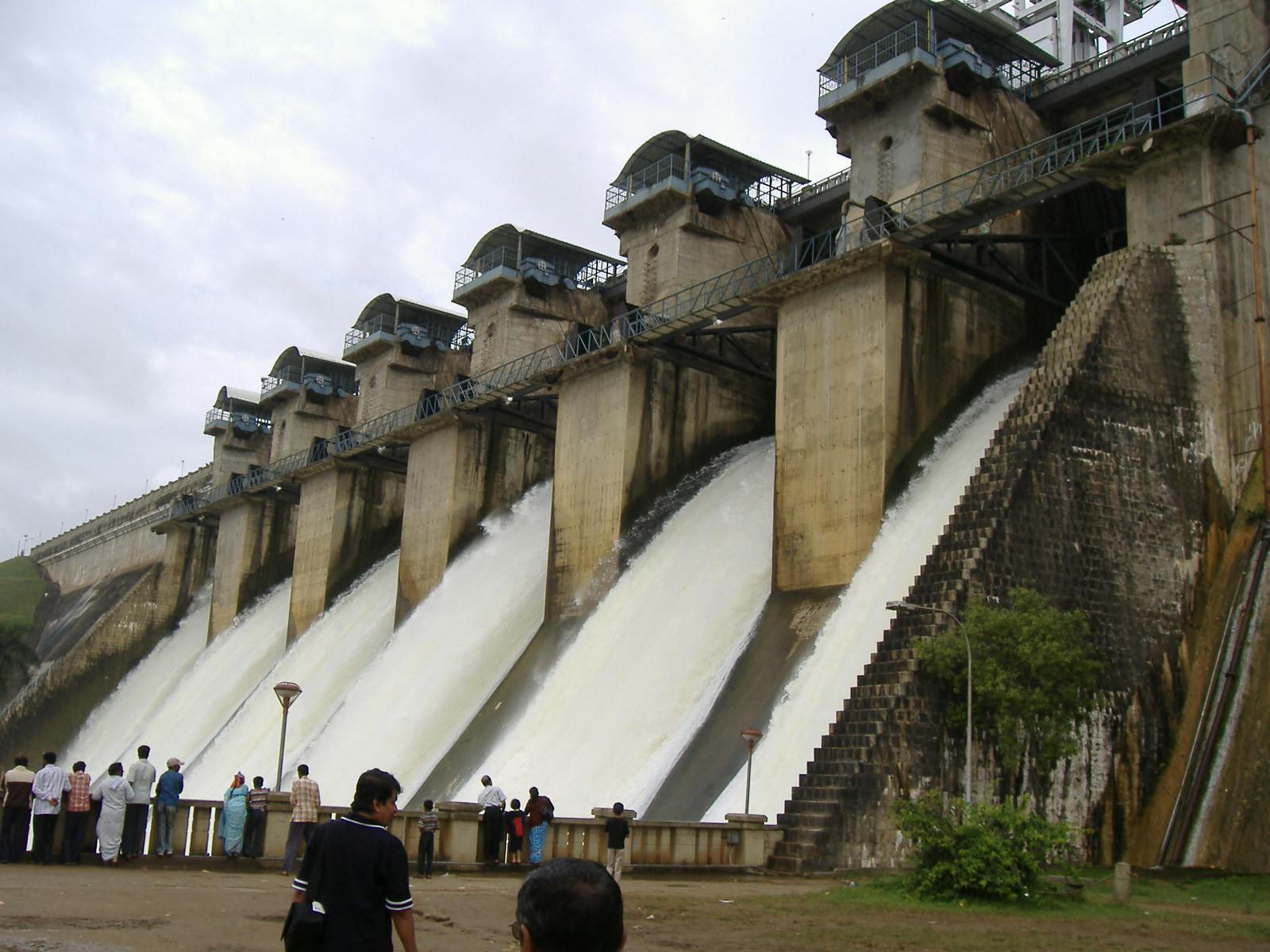
Hemavati Dam and Reservoir in Gorur

Lying between 12° 13´ and 13° 33´ North latitudes and 75° 33´ and 76°38´ East longitude, Hassan district has a total area of 6826.15 km^{2}. The geography is mixed with the malnad or mountainous region to the west and south-west and the maidan or plain regions in the north, south-east hence the area is referred to as Are Malenadu (semi-malnad) (ಅರೆಮಲೆನಾಡು). There are some areas of degraded forest ranges in central portion of the district.

The district is surrounded by Chikmagalur District to the north, Tumkur District to the east, Mandya District to the south east, Mysore to the south, Kodagu District to the south west and Dakshina Kannada district to the west.

Hassan and Belur stand around 950 metres (3,120 ft) and 970 metres (3,180 ft) above sea level, respectively.

Most of the district lies in the watershed of the Hemavathi River, a tributary of the Kaveri River. The general level of Hassan district slopes with the course of the Hemavati, from the peaks of the Western Ghats downwards to the southeast. The chief tributary of the Hemavathi is the Yagachi River, which flows southward from Belur taluk to join the Hemavathi near Gorur. In 1981 the Hemavathi Dam was completed near Gorur, downstream from the confluence with the Yagachi, creating a reservoir of 8000 hectares. The Hemavathi passes through Holenarsipur taluk in a southerly direction and joins with the Kaveri near Hampapura in Mysore district, close to the border of Hassan district. The Kaveri flows through the southern-most part of the District precisely Arkalgud taluk.

Western portions of the district are drained by the headwaters of the Netravati River, which flows northwestward to empty into the Arabian Sea. Portions of Arsikere taluk in the northeast are drained by the Hagari River it is also called as Vedavathi River, a tributary of the Tungabhadra River. The basins of the Kaveri and Tungabhadra are separated by a range of low granitic hills extending through Belur, Hassan, and Arsikere taluks.

The Bisle Ghat, or Bisale Ghat, is a portion of the Western Ghats range in the western part of the district. Main peaks include Jenukallu betta, Sakleshpura (4,558 feet (1,389 m)), the highest peak in the district, Murkangudda (4,265 feet (1,300 m)), and Devarbetta (4,206 feet (1,282 m)). Pushpagiri (1,712 meters), lies immediately southwest in Kodagu district. Bisle, Kagneri, Kanchankumari reserve forests cover portions the Bisle Ghat, and adjoin Pushpagiri Wildlife Sanctuary in Kodagu.

=== Climate and rainfall ===
Hassan district is located on the leeward side of Western Ghats, thus receives less rainfall than coastal Karnataka. During Monsoon rainfall is heavy with an average down pour of approximately 700 mm. The district comes under three river basins: Netravathi, Kaveri and Vedavathi. Considering the general climate and rainfall the district has been divided into three regions: Southern-Malnad, semi-Malnad and southern-plain. The Southern-Malnad is a forest-clad hilly region with heavy rainfall. In 2022, the district received an average annual rainfall of 1,701 millimetres (67.0 in), of which, Hethur hobli in Sakleshpura taluk received the maximum downpour of 4,305 millimetres (169.5 in) and Arsikere hoblis received 986 millimetres (38.8 in), the lowest in the district. In 2025, Hassan district received on average 1,480 millimetres (58 in) of annual rainfall, which was 30% above normal. Hethur/Hettur hobli received a staggering 6,488.2 millimetres (255.44 in), the highest amongst all the hoblis in the state, even surpassing those in coastal region. The district emulates the typical Savanna climate and hence is mostly dry. The Summer Season is warm, with temparature varying between 33°C to 18°C. The Winter Season has pleasant weather with temperature ranging between 33°C maximum to 14°C minimum.

=== Rivers ===
No major rivers originate in the district, but few named and several more unnamed, unknown streams/tributaries originate in the Western Ghats region. Most of these streams are tributaries of Netravati River. Some of them are:

1. Yettinahole
2. Kempuhole
3. Kadumane hole
4. Addahole
5. Kabbinale
6. Aigooru hole - Tributary of Hemavati River
7. Votehole (Watehole) - Tributary of Yagachi River, Hemavathi River, kaveri River
8. Gange-mudi stream (Hagari/Vedavathi River) - Tributary of Tungabhadra River

=== Agriculture ===
Main crops grown in the district are ragi, coconut, potato, paddy, sugarcane, maize, coffee and black pepper. Hassan district ranks second in production of coconut and ragi in the state after Tumakuru district and ranks third in coffee production after Kodagu district and Chikmagalur district.

== Demographics ==
Historical population
Year	Pop.	±% p.a.
1901	568,919	—
1911	578,097	+0.16%
1921	581,750	+0.06%
1931	596,937	+0.26%
1941	627,718	+0.50%
1951	715,135	+1.31%
1961	895,847	+2.28%
1971	1,102,370	+2.10%
1981	1,357,014	+2.10%
1991	1,569,684	+1.47%
2001	1,721,669	+0.93%
2011	1,776,421	+0.31%

Religions in Hassan district (2011)
Religion	Percent
Hinduism	91.80%
Islam	6.76%
Christianity	0.88%
Other or not stated	0.56%

According to the 2011 census Hassan district has a population of 1,776,421, roughly equal to the nation of The Gambia or the US state of Nebraska. This gives it a ranking of 270th in India (out of a total of 640). The district has a population density of 261 inhabitants per square kilometre (680/sq mi) . Its population growth rate over the decade 2001-2011 was 3.17%. Hassan has a sex ratio of 1005 females for every 1000 males, and a literacy rate of 75.89%. 21.21% of the population lives in urban areas. Scheduled Castes and Scheduled Tribes make up 19.42% and 1.82% of the population respectively.

Languages of Hassan district (2011)
1. Kannada (87.0%)
2. Urdu (6.16%)
3. Telugu (1.96%)
4. Tulu (1.22%)
5. Tamil (0.91%)
6. Others (2.71%)

At the time of the 2011 census, 87.04% of the population spoke Kannada, 6.16% Urdu, 1.96% Telugu, 1.22% Tulu and 0.91% Tamil as their first language.

== Government and politics ==
=== Governance ===
The current member of parliament from Hassan is Shreyas M. Patel, the grandson of former member of parliament G. Puttaswamy Gowda. The current member of the Karnataka Legislative Assembly is Swaroop Prakash.

=== Administrative divisions ===
Hassan district is divided into two revenue sub-divisions; Hassan and Sakleshpura talukas, each headed by a sub-divisional Magistrate a.k.a Assistant Commissioner. Each sub-division comprises four talukas each:

- Hassan sub-division: Hassan, Arsikere, Channarayapatna, Holenarasipura
- Sakaleshapura sub-division: Sakleshpur, Belur, Alur, Arkalgud.

=== Villages ===
The district has 258 panchayat villages.

Notable villages include:

- Gubbi, Holenarasipura

=== Map gallery ===
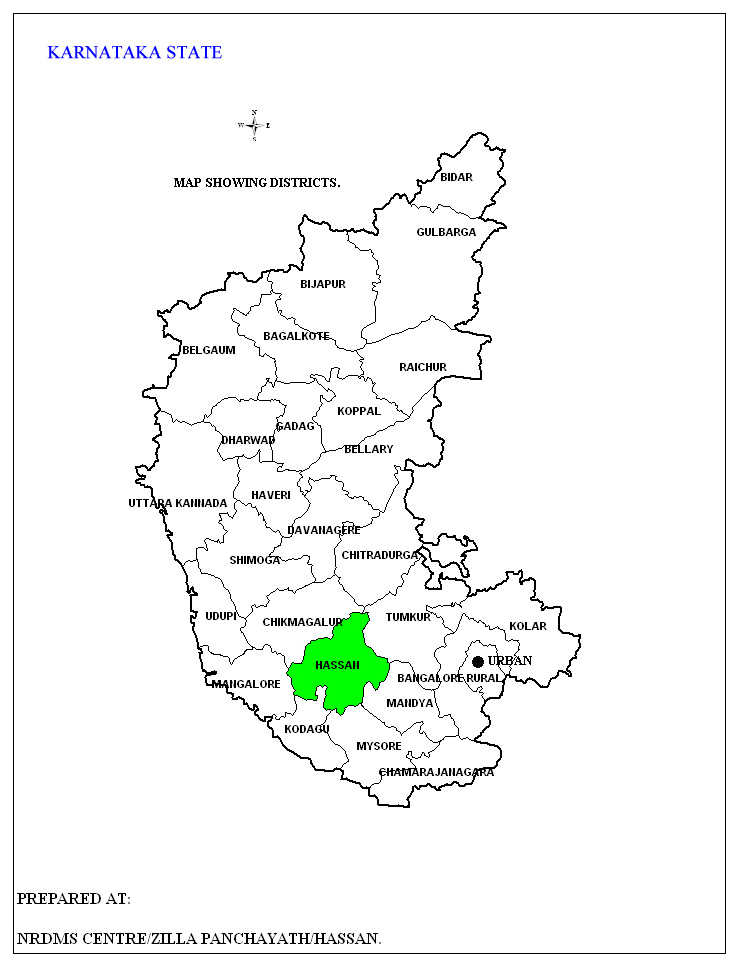
Positioning of Hassan district in Karnataka

Positioning of Hassan district in Karnataka (Including Taluks)

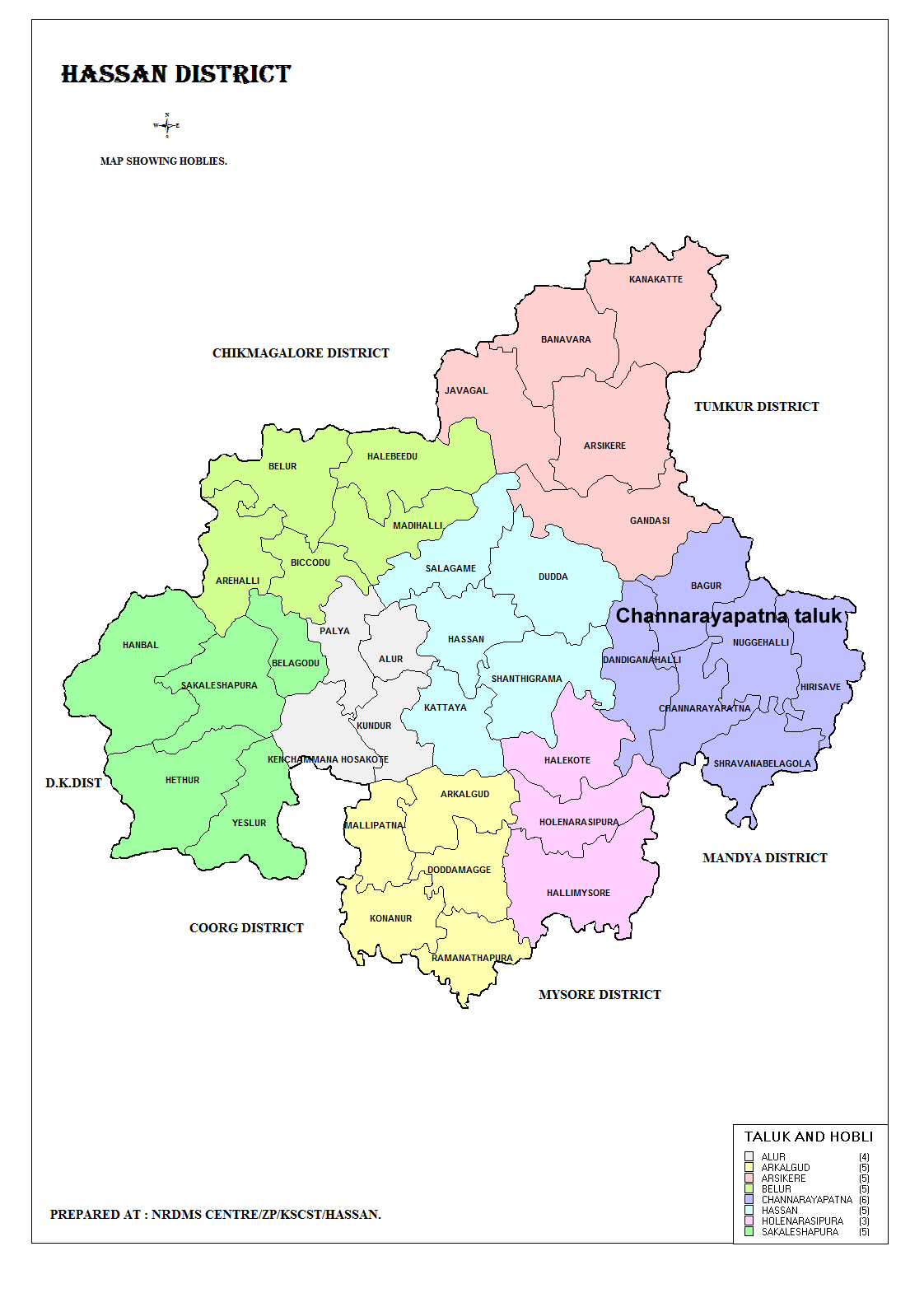
Hobli Map of Hassan district

Hobli Map with Regions shading

District Tourism Map

Road Network of Hassan district

Taluks of Hassan district

== Tourism ==
=== List of famous temples in Hassan District: ===
- Chennakesava Temple, Belur taluk
- Hoysaleswara Temple, Halebidu, Belur taluk
- Gommateshwara Statue, Shravanabelagola, Channarayapatna taluk
- Hasanamba Temple, Hassan taluk
- Nageshvara-Chennakeshava Temple, Mosale, Holenarasipura taluk
- Ishvara Temple, Arsikere taluk
- Bucesvara Temple, Koravangala, Hassan taluk

== Education ==
- Government Engineering College, Hassan
- Rajeev Institute of Technology
- Kendriya Vidyalaya
- Malnad College of Engineering
- St. Joseph's College, Hassan
- Podar International School, Hassan

== Notable people ==
- H. D. Deve Gowda, 11th Prime Minister of India
- Gorur Ramaswamy Iyengar, Renowned Kannada writer
- S. L. Bhyrappa, writer
- Raja Rao, Indian-American writer
- S. N. Sethuram, actor, director, writer
- H. C. Srikantaiah, Former Minister and Member of Parliament
- Javagal Srinath, cricketer
- T. N. Balakrishna, Indian actor
- Dheerendra Gopal, film actor
- Doddanna, film actor
- Yash, Kannada film actor
- Sharan, film actor
- Shruti, actress
- Chitra Shenoy, Indian actress
- Nikhil Kumar, Indian actor and politician
- Prajwal Revanna, Indian politician
- David Johnson, Ranji player
- Dhananjay, film actor
- M. G. Srinivas, actor and director
- G. R. Gopinath, founder of Air Deccan
- H. D. Revanna, politician
- H. D. Kumaraswamy, Former Chief Minister, Karnataka
- H. S. Prakash, Indian politician
- Narayana Gowda, Karnataka Rakshana Vedike state president
- Chandan Shetty, Kannada rapper
- Nanditha, Indian singer
- Harihara, Kannada poet and writer
- Milana Nagaraj, Kannada film actress
- Vasishta N. Simha, film actor
- Prathap Simha, politician
- C. N. Manjunath, Cardiologist and the Director of the Sri Jayadeva Institute of Cardiovascular Sciences and Research
- Achyuth Kumar, Indian film actor
- A. S. Kiran Kumar, Indian space scientist and former chairman of the ISRO
- Chetan Baboor, Indian table tennis player
- Suhas Lalinakere Yathiraj, IAS and Para-Badminton player
- Shashank Subramanyam, Indian musician
- J. Anoop Seelin, Indian music composer and playback singer
- Aarathi, Indian actress
- K. S. Ashwath, Indian actor
- Gudibande Poornima, poet & novelist
- S. K. Ramachandra Rao, Indian author
- R. Shamasastry, Sanskrit scholar
- Satchidanandendra Saraswati, monk-scholar
- K. Pattabhi Jois, Indian yoga guru
- Rudrapatnam Brothers, Indian carnatic musicians
- R. K. Padmanabha, Indian Carnatic music vocalist
- R. K. Srikantan, vocalist
- Rathnamala Prakash, Indian singer
- Prithviraj, Kannada actor
- Vijaya Dabbe, Indian writer, feminist, scholar
- Girisha Nagarajegowda, Paralympic athlete
- H. K. Narayana, Singer and music composer
- Nisha Ravikrishnan, Television actress

== See also ==
- Haanagal
- Manjarabad Fort, a star fort from 1792
- Shravanabelagola
- Sakleshpur
- Mangalore
- Belur
- Halebidu
- Rudrapatna
