= National Highway 234 (India, old numbering) =

National Highway in India

National Highway 234

Route information
- Length: 780 km (480 mi)

Major junctions
- From: Mangalore, Karnataka
- Sira - NH 4, Venkatagirikota - NH 219, Vellore - NH 46, Thiruvannaamalai NH 66
- To: Villupuram, Tamil Nadu

Location
- Country: India
- States: Karnataka:509 km, Andhra Pradesh:23 km, Tamil Nadu: 234 km, Total: 780km
- Primary destinations: Gowribidanur, Chintamani, Venkatagirikota, Gudiyatham, Vellore, Thiruvannaamalai

Highway system
- Roads in India; Expressways; National; State; Asian

National Highway 234 (NH 234), was a National Highway in India that originated in Mangalore, Karnataka, travelled through Venkatagirikota, Andhra Pradesh and Vellore, Thiruvannamalai, Tamil Nadu, terminating at Villupuram, Tamil Nadu.

Under the new highway numbering system, Mangalore to Banavara part of this highway was merged with National Highway 73, Banavara to Mulbagal has been a part of National Highway 69, Mulbagal to Vellore is tagged as National Highway 75 and Vellore to Villupuram sector now comes under National Highway 38.

== Route ==
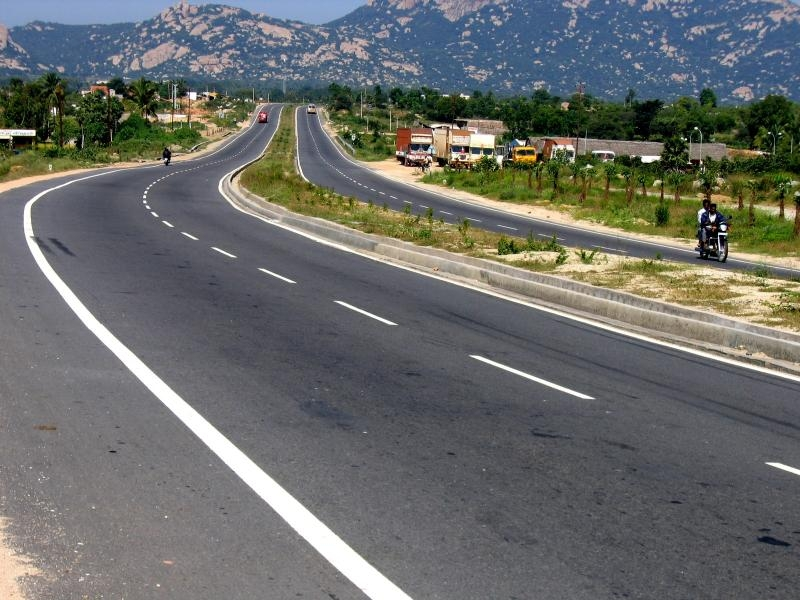
NH 234, part of which has been renumbered as NH 73 in Karnataka.

Mangalore - Bantwal - Madanthyar - Belthangady - Ujire - Charmadi - Mudigere - Belur - javagal - Huliyar - Bukkapattana - Sira - Madhugiri-Byranahalli -Kotaladinne- Gauribidanur- Manchenahalli - Chikkaballapur- Shidlaghatta- Chintamani-Srinivaspura- Mulabagal (NH-4) - Venkatagirikota - Pernampattu - Gudiyatham - Vellore - Kannamangalam - Polur - Thiruvannaamalai - Villupuram

As the forest department does not allow the widening of the roads going through the western Ghats, it is expected that a tunnel will be built, same like as proposed by Japanese consultants to the Shiradi Ghat of NH-75 (Old Number NH-48). A tunnel will help in reducing the travel time by 3 hours, reduce the fuel usage and increase the productivity of the industries around. It will also provide an alternative route to the large sized trucks transporting materials to the seaport and air-cargo facility at Mangalore .

== Junctions ==
NH 66 Terminal near Mangaluru
NH 75 near Bantval
NH 173 near Mudigere
NH 373 near Belur
NH 69 near Banavara
NH 150A near Huliyar
NH 48 near Sira
NH 544E near Sira
NH 44 near Chikkaballapur
NH 75 near Mulabagilu
NH 42 near Venkatagirikota
NH 48 near Vellore
NH 179B near Tiruvannamalai
NH 332 Terminal near Villupuram.

== See also ==
- List of national highways in India
- National Highways Development Project
- List of national highways in Karnataka
- List of national highways in Andhra Pradesh
- List of national highways in Tamil Nadu
