= State Highway 107 (Karnataka) =

State Highway of Karnataka

State Highway 107

Route information
- Maintained by Karnataka Road Development Corporation Limited
- Length: 57.84 km (35.94 mi)

Major junctions
- North end: Jannapura
- South end: Vanagoor/Kudrasthe

Location
- Country: India
- State: Karnataka
- Primary destinations: Hanbalu, Aane Mahal, Hethur

Highway system
- Roads in India; Expressways; National; State; Asian; State Highways in Karnataka

State Highway 107, also known as SH-107, is a state highway connecting Jannapura village of Mudigere taluk in Chikkamagaluru district and Vanagoor village of Sakleshpura taluk in Hassan district, in the South Indian state of Karnataka. It has a total length of 57.84 kilometres (35.94 mi).

It is a short distance State Highway, passing entirely through the hilly regions of Hassan and Chikkamagaluru districts. No major cities lie on this highway.

Towns and villages located on this highway are: Jannapura, Bettadamane, Shiragundha, Anjugodana halli, Avarekadu, Baachanahalli, Hanbalu, Venkatahalli, Agalatti, Kyamanahalli, Gaanada hole, Hebbasale, Aane Mahal (on NH-75), Hirugalu, Sathigala, Jaanekere, Sullakki, Laxmipura, Vaddara halli, Hiriyuru, Bannalli, Konabana halli, Hethur, Hadya, Halliyuru, Byagadahalli and Vanagoor.

In the northern end, at Jannapura, this highway originates from National Highway 73 (India) and traverses south to meet State Highway 8 (Karnataka) and State Highway 85 (Karnataka) at Vanagoor. Due to confluence of these three highways, Vanagoor is also called as Kudrasthe.
