= National Highway 716G (India) =

National Highway in India

National Highway 716G
- Kadiri–Jammalamadugu Road; Kadiri–Hindupur Road

Route information
- Length: 172.5 km (107.2 mi)

Major junctions
- East end: Muddanur
- Kadiri
- West end: Hindupur

Location
- Country: India
- State: Andhra Pradesh
- Municipalities: Kadiri
- Primary destinations: Pulivendula, Kadiri, Gorantla

Highway system
- Roads in India; Expressways; National; State; Asian; State Highways in Andhra Pradesh
← NH 716	→ NH 544E

National Highway 716G (NH 716G) is a national highway in India, that run in state of Andhra Pradesh. The eastern terminus is at NH 716 in Muddanur, a small town in Kadapa district. The western terminus is at NH 544E near Hindupur. This national highway is a merge of two state highways which originated from the same city, Kadiri. These state highways were State Highways 60 (SH 60, the Kadiri–Jammalamadugu Road) and SH 61 (the Kadiri–Hindupur Road).

== Route ==
It passes through Pulivendula, Kadiri (junction with NH 42), ObulaDevaraCheruvu, Gorantla, Palasamudram

== Junctions ==
- NH 716 terminus near Muddanur
- NH 42 near Kadiri
- NH 544E terminal near Hindupur

== Construction ==
Widening of existing road to four-lane from Muddanur to B. Kothapalli section of NH 716G in the State of Andhra Pradesh has been sanctioned with budget of ₹ 1080.91 crore.

Widening and reconstruction of existing road to four-lane from B. Kothapalli junction to Gorantla (excluding Kadiri Bypass) of NH 716G (Muddanuru–Hindupur), in the state of Andhra Pradesh has been sanctioned with budget of ₹ 839.98 crore.
