= National Highway 716B (India) =

Road in India

National Highway 716B
- Map of National Highway 716B in red

Route information
- Length: 117 km (73 mi)
- Status: Under construction

Major junctions
- West end: NE 7 in Chittoor
- NH 40 in Chittoor; NH 716 in Nagari
- East end: NH 716A in Periyapalayam

Location
- Country: India
- States: Andhra Pradesh, Tamil Nadu

Highway system
- Roads in India; Expressways; National; State; Asian
← NH 716A	→ NH 17

Chittoor–Thatchur Expressway, newly numbered as NH716B, is a 117-kilometre (73 mi) under-construction green field access controlled highway in India. The highway will be part of Bharatmala Pariyojana and will start at Keenatampalli near Chittoor and terminate at Thatchur near Ponneri, Chennai.

== Status updates ==
- Feb 2019: Farmers in some villages are opposing land acquisition.
- Aug 2020: The target date for completion of expressway is set as March 2024.
- Mar 2024: Construction not yet commenced due to farmer protests

== See also ==
- Bangalore–Chennai Expressway
