= Kasturi Rangappa Nayaka Fort =

- Location within India
- 13°44′35″N 76°54′50″E
- Type: Fortification
- Location: Sira, Tumkur district, Karnataka, India

History
- Built: 17th century
- Abandoned: ruins

Site notes
- Area: 197.5 acres (79.9 ha)
- Owner: Nayakas of Chitradurga

The Kasturi Rangappa Nayaka Fort in Sira in Tumkur district of Karnataka is named after the Nayaka ruler Kasturi Rangappa Nayaka, who had ruled over Sira in the early 17th century as a palegar under the Vijayanagar Empire. After their rule, the fort and the Province of Sira came under the control of several rulers. Restoration works have been carried out by the Archaeology Department of Karnataka.

== Location ==
The Nayaka Fort is located in the Sira town in Tumkur district of Karnataka. It is located on the NH-48 (Old number NH-4) and NH-69 (Old Number NH-234). It is 123 kilometres (76 mi) from Bengaluru.

== History ==
History of building the fort is traced to the early 17th century when Nayakas (Kasturi Rangappa Nayaka) ruled over Sira as a fiefdom under the Vijayanagara Empire. He laid the foundation for the Sira town and the fort. The site was selected as auspicious on the basis of a good omen of a hare chasing the hound, a common legend of the times in the building of many forts in India. The foundation of Sira is also based upon this legend. Before the fort was completed, Sira and its fiefdoms were captured by an army sent by the Bijapuri general Randullah Khan. A force led by his subordinate Afzal Khan defeated and killed and the Sira chief Kasturi Rangappa Nayaka. Malik Husen, who was the then made the governor, completed the construction of the fort and also built a mud wall enclosing the town.

Sira, according to a time line, was under the reign of Vijayanagara Empire (1638 to 1687), the Adil Shahi of Bijapur Sultanate, the Mughal Empire (1687 to 1757) and Maratha (1757 to 1759 and 1766, the Wadeyars (1799 to 1947) and the British Raj (until 1947).

== Features ==
The fort, made of stone and bricks, is spread over an area of 197.5 acres (79.9 ha) and has many historic monuments which need to be conserved. The fort was enclosed by a moat and a well-made glacis also formed part of the fortifications.

== Restoration ==
The restoration works undertaken on the fort by the Archaeological Department of Karnataka, particularly of the ramparts and other works made of stone and bricks were carried out initially with the use of bulldozers. The brick and masonry work were destroyed irretrievably and gun positions had been closed. According to the INTACH expert, international procedures and guidelines prescribed in ASI manuals prescribed for such restoration works had not been followed. However, the local Archaeology Conservation Engineer defending his work said the brick layer (1.5 inches thick) removed was too thin to be retrieved and not available in the market and that the outer layer would be restored with older bricks and the original openings of placement of gun and canons would be restored fully including repair of parapet walls. Following the objections, use of heavy machinery for restoration was stopped. Another issue which was affecting the fort was widening of the NH-69 (Old Number NH-234). This was resolved by the Government of India by keeping a safe margin of 90 metres (300 ft) between the fort boundary and the highway.
