= National Highway 69 (India) =

National highway in India

National Highway 69

- Schematic map of Renumbered National Highways in India

Route information

Major junctions
- West end: NH 66 in Honnavar
- List: NH 369E in Sagara; NH 766C in Anandapuram; NH 169 in Shivamogga; NH 369E in Bhadravathi; NH 173 in Kaduru; NH 73 in Banavara; NH 150A in Huliyaru; NH 48 / NH 544E in Sira; NH 44 in Chikkaballapura; NH 75 in Mulabagilu; NH 42 in Palamaneru; NE 7 in Mogili; NH 140 in Chittoor
- East end: NH 40 in Chittoor

Location
- Country: India
- States: Andhra Pradesh; Karnataka
- Primary destinations: Honnavar, Sagara Shivamoga, Kadur, Banavar Huliyar, Sira, Madhugiri, Gauribidanur, Manchenahalli, Chikkaballapur, Sidlaghatta, Chintamani, Srinivasapura, Mulbagal, Palamaner, Chittoor, Pallipattu, Puttur, Renigunta.

Highway system
- Roads in India; Expressways; National; State; Asian
← NH 68	→ NH 70

National Highway 69 (NH 69) previously National Highway 206 (From Honnavara to Banavara section) and National Highway 234 (From Huliyar to Mulbagal section)) is a 732 km (455 mi) long major National Highway in India that runs through the states of Karnataka and Andhra Pradesh. The western terminal is located at the junction of NH 66 near Honnavar, and it connects with NH 48 near Sira, NH 44 near Chikkaballapur, and NH 75 near Mulbagal. The eastern terminal is situated at Chittoor, in a junction with NH 40. Its old name was NH 234.

== Route ==
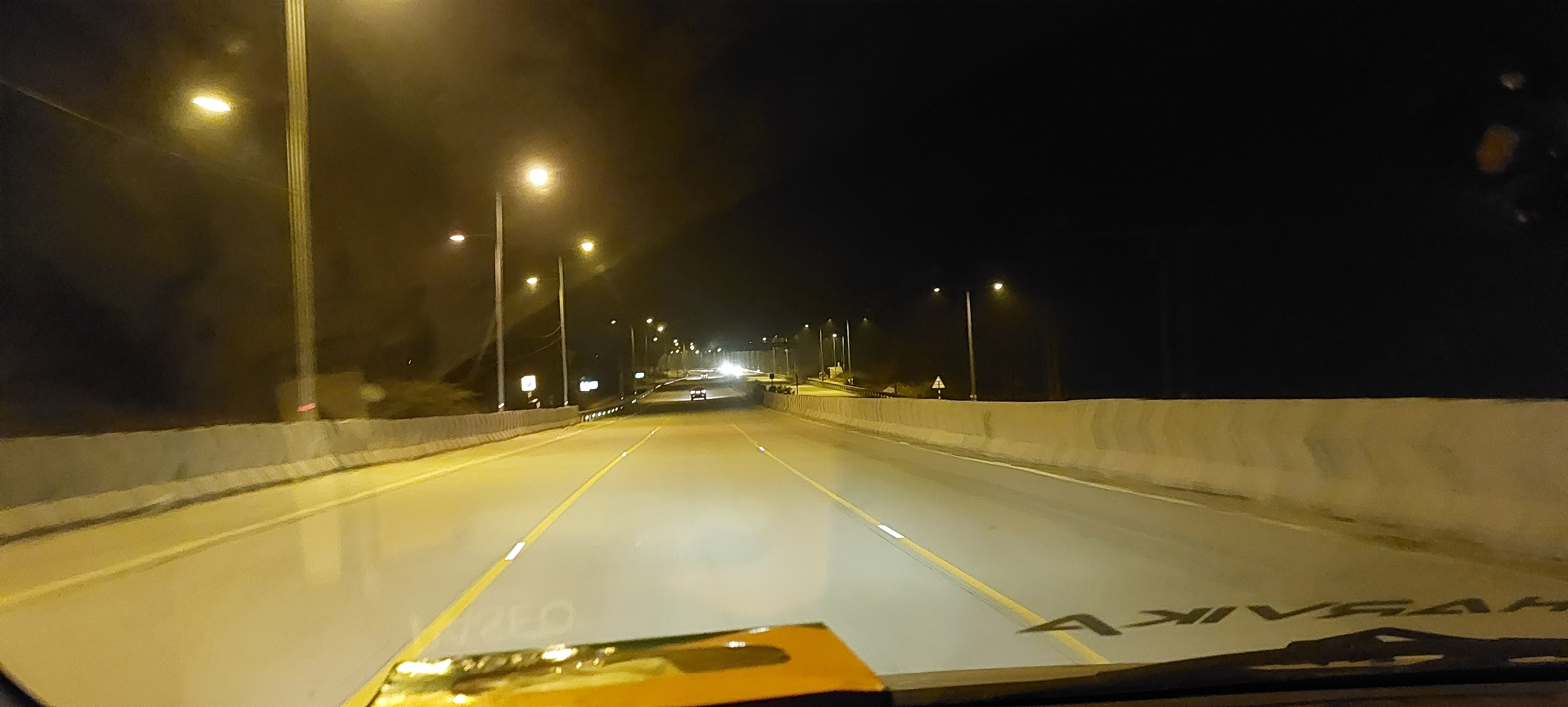
Section of NH 69 near Bangarupalem at night

It starts from Honnavar & passes through Sagara, Shivamoga, Tarikere, Kadur, Banavara, Huliyar, Bukkapatna, Sira, Madhugiri, Kotaladinne, Gowribidanur, Manchenahalli, Chikkaballapur, Sidlaghatta, Chintamani, Srinivasapura, Mulbagal, Nangali in Karnataka, and in Andhra Pradesh, it passes through Palamaner, Chittoor, & ends at Chittoor.

Route length in states:

- Andhra Pradesh – 162 km (101 mi)
- Karnataka - 570 km (350 mi)

== See also ==
- List of national highways in India
- Ghat Roads
- National Highway 66 (India)
- National Highway 169 (India)
- National Highway 73 (India)
- National Highway 48 (India)
- National Highway 40 (India)
