= Badavanahalli =

Village in Karnataka, India

- Village
- Location within Karnataka Location within India
- Coordinates: 13°40′38″N 77°03′50″E
- Country: India
- State: Karnataka
- District: Tumakuru
- Taluk: Madhugiri
- Elevation: 733 m (2,405 ft)

Population (2011)
  - Total: 4,332
- Time zone: UTC+5:30 (IST)
- PIN: 572112

Badavanahalli is a village within Madhugiri Taluk, Tumakuru District, Karnataka, India. It is located at 37 kilometres north of the district seat Tumkur, and 16 kilometres west of the subdistrict seat Madhugiri. In the year 2011, it has a total population of 4,332.

== Geography ==
Badavanahalli is situated at the western side of Madhugiri Taluk. The National Highway 69 passes through the village. The village has an average elevation of 733 metres above the sea level.

== Climate ==
Badavanahalli has a Tropical Savanna Climate (Aw). It sees the most precipitation in October, with 137 mm of average rainfall; and the least in January, with 3 mm of average rainfall.

Climate data for Badavanahalli
Month	Jan	Feb	Mar	Apr	May	Jun	Jul	Aug	Sep	Oct	Nov	Dec	Year
Mean daily maximum °C (°F)	28.9 (84.0)	31.3 (88.3)	33.9 (93.0)	34.8 (94.6)	33.3 (91.9)	29.1 (84.4)	27.6 (81.7)	27.3 (81.1)	27.9 (82.2)	27.8 (82.0)	27.2 (81.0)	27.4 (81.3)	29.7 (85.5)
Daily mean °C (°F)	22.1 (71.8)	24.4 (75.9)	27.2 (81.0)	28.4 (83.1)	27.2 (81.0)	24.6 (76.3)	23.6 (74.5)	23.3 (73.9)	23.5 (74.3)	23.2 (73.8)	22.1 (71.8)	21.4 (70.5)	24.2 (75.7)
Mean daily minimum °C (°F)	15.5 (59.9)	17.4 (63.3)	20 (68)	22 (72)	22.3 (72.1)	21.5 (70.7)	21 (70)	20.5 (68.9)	20 (68)	19.2 (66.6)	17.3 (63.1)	15.7 (60.3)	19.4 (66.9)
Average rainfall mm (inches)	3 (0.1)	5 (0.2)	13 (0.5)	31 (1.2)	85 (3.3)	106 (4.2)	113 (4.4)	110 (4.3)	112 (4.4)	137 (5.4)	56 (2.2)	14 (0.6)	785 (30.8)
Source: Climate-Data.org

== Demographics ==
As of the 2011 Census of India, Badavanahalli has a total of 1,078 households. Its population is 4,332, of which 2,164 are male residents and 2,168 are female residents. The literacy rate is at 71.26%, with 1,671 of the male residents and 1,416 of the female residents being literate.
