= Jannapura, Mudigere =

Jannapura Chinniga - Jannapura
- Village
- Chinniga-Jannapura
- Location in Karnataka, India
- Coordinates: 13.082347°N 75.684699°E
- Country: India
- State: Karnataka
- District: Chikkamagaluru
- Taluk: Mudigere

Government
  - Body: Grama Panchayath

Area
  - Total: 3.03 km^{2} (1.17 sq mi)
- Elevation: 968 m (3,176 ft)

Population (2011)
  - Total: 1,280
  - Density: 422/km^{2} (1,090/sq mi)

Languages
  - Official: Kannada
- Time zone: UTC+5:30 (IST)
- PIN: 577132
- Vehicle registration: KA-18

Jannapura (also known as Chinniga-Jannapura), is a village in Mudigere taluk of Chikmagalur district, Karnataka, India.

As per census survey of India 2011, its location code number is 610023.

The village is located on National Highway 73 (India) between the towns of Mudigere and Belur. It is 12 km from Mudigere and 40 km from its district headquarter, Chikkamagaluru.

== Places of interest ==
1. Jenukallu betta, Sakleshpura
2. Ettina Bhuja
3. Devaramane Betta
