= National Highway 373 (India) =

National Highway in India

National Highway 373

Route information
- Auxiliary route of NH 73
- Length: 150 km (93 mi)

Major junctions
- North end: AIT Circle, Chikmagalur
- South end: Bilikere

Location
- Country: India
- States: Karnataka

Highway system
- Roads in India; Expressways; National; State; Asian
| ← NH 73 | → NH 275 |

National Highway 373, commonly referred to as NH 373 is a national highway in India. It is a secondary route of National Highway 73. The NH-373 runs in the state of Karnataka in India. Starting point is AIT Circle, Chikmagalur and ending point is Bilikere and connected Cities are Chikmagalur, Hassan, Holenarasipura.

== Route ==
NH-373 passes through Chikmagalur, Belur, Hassan, Holenarasipura, Krishnarajanagara and Bilikere in the state of Karnataka.

== Junctions ==
1. NH 173 Terminal in AIT Circle, Chikmagalur
2. SH 57 near Hiremagaluru, Chikmagalur
3. NH 73 near Belur
4. SH 71 near Hassan
5. SH 21 at Hassan
6. NH 75 near Hassan
7. SH 121 near Halekote
8. SH 102 near Holenarasipura
9. SH 8 at Holenarasipura
10. SH 108 near Holenarasipura
11. SH 85 at Bherya
12. SH 120 near Hampapura
13. SH 108 near Yedathore, Krishnarajanagara
14. SH 117 near Arakere
15. NH 275 Terminal near Bilikere

== See also ==
- List of national highways in India
- List of national highways in India by state
- National Highway 52 (India)
