= National Highway 369E (India) =

National Highway in India

National Highway 369E
- Map of National Highway 369E in red

Route information
- Auxiliary route of NH 69
- Length: 68 km (42 mi)

Major junctions
- North end: Sagar
- South end: Markutuka

Location
- Country: India
- States: Karnataka

Highway system
- Roads in India; Expressways; National; State; Asian
← NH 69	→ NH 766C

National Highway 369E, commonly referred to as NH 369E is a national highway in India. It is a secondary route of National Highway 69. NH-369E runs in the state of Karnataka in India.

== Route ==
NH369E connects Sagar, Avinahalli, Holebaglu, Kalasavalli, Sighandoor and Marakutuka in the state of Karnataka.

== Junctions ==
NH 69 Terminal near Sagar.
NH 766C Terminal near Markutuka.

== See also ==
- List of national highways in India
- List of national highways in India by state
