= Chinthamakulapalli =

- Village
- Interactive map of Chinthamakulapalli
- Location in Andhra Pradesh, India Chinthamakulapalli (India)
- Coordinates: 13.8334307°N 78.900887°E
- Country: India
- State: Andhra Pradesh
- District: Chittoor
- Mandal: Venkatagirikota

Languages
  - Official: Telugu
- Time zone: UTC+5:30 (IST)
- Vehicle registration: AP

Chinthamakulapalli is a village in Chittoor district of the Indian state of Andhra Pradesh. It is located in Venkatagirikota mandal.
