= Vasthare =

Vastare
- village
- Vastare
- Interactive map of Vastare
- Coordinates: 13.267312°N 75.709707°E
- Country: India
- State: Karnataka
- Region: Malenadu

Government
  - Body: Grama Panchayat

Area
  - Total: 13.18 km^{2} (5.09 sq mi)
- Elevation: 1,090 m (3,580 ft)

Population (2011)
  - Total: 1,763
  - Density: 133.8/km^{2} (346.4/sq mi)

Languages
  - Official: Kannada
- Time zone: UTC+5:30 (IST)
- PIN: 577133
- Vehicle registration: KA-18

Vastare is a village in Chikmagalur taluk of the same district. It is situated 9 km southwest of Chikmagalur city on NH-173.
