= National Highway 71 (India) =

National highway in India

National Highway 71
- Map of National Highway 3 in red
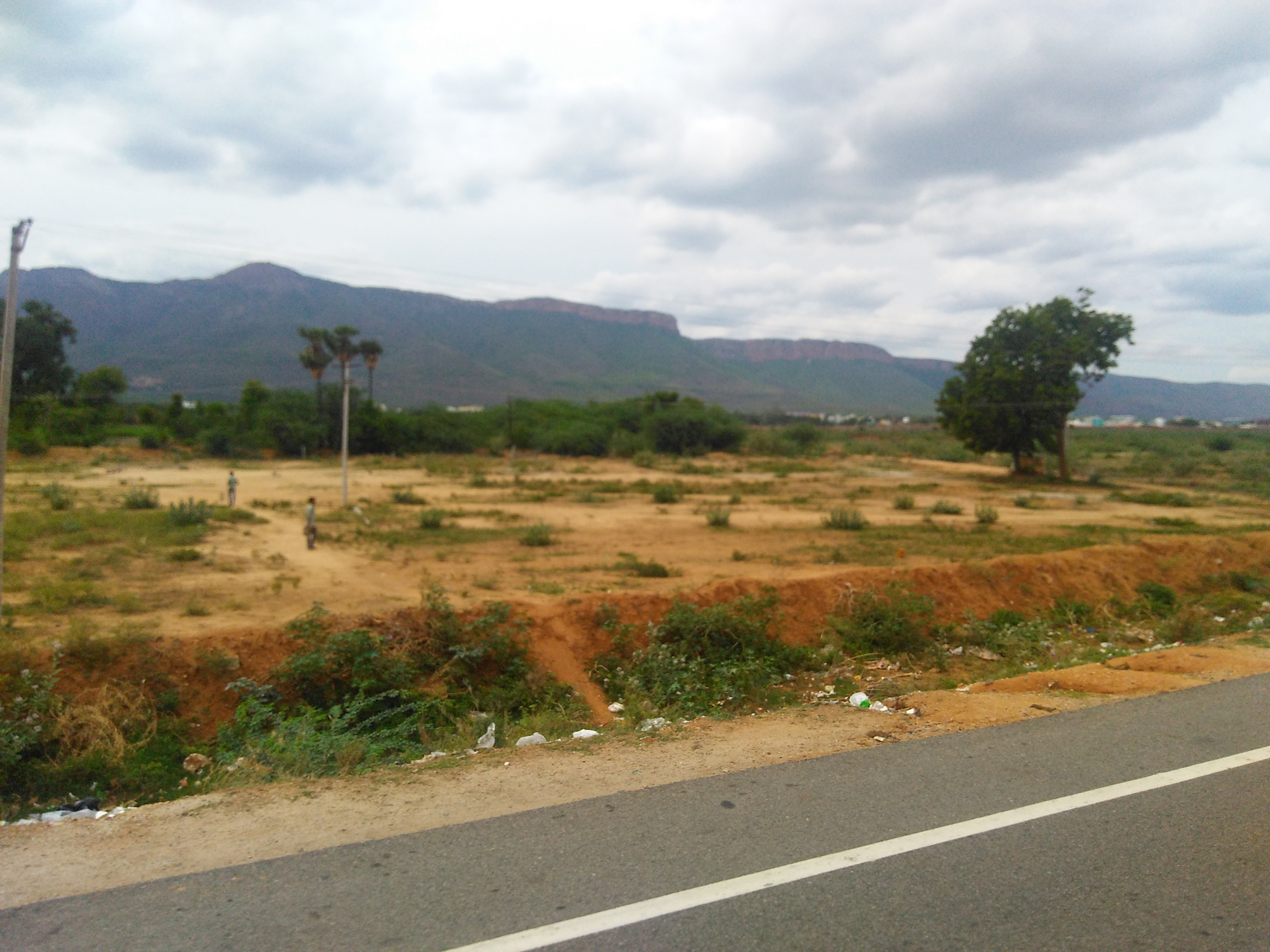
- View of Seven hills near Tirupati

Route information
- Part of AH20
- Length: 190.6 km (118.4 mi)

Major junctions
- West end: Madanapalle
- East end: Naidupeta

Location
- Country: India
- States: Andhra Pradesh
- Primary destinations: Madanapalle, Pileru, Tirupati, Renigunta

Highway system
- Roads in India; Expressways; National; State; Asian
← NH 70	→ NH 72

National Highway 71 (NH 71) (previously National Highway 205) is a National Highway in India, that lies completely in the state of Andhra Pradesh. This highway passes through Temple city Tirupati and connects with Coastal Andhra Pradesh. The western terminal starts at the junction of National Highway 42 near Madanapalle and terminates at the junction of National Highway 16 near Naidupeta in the east.

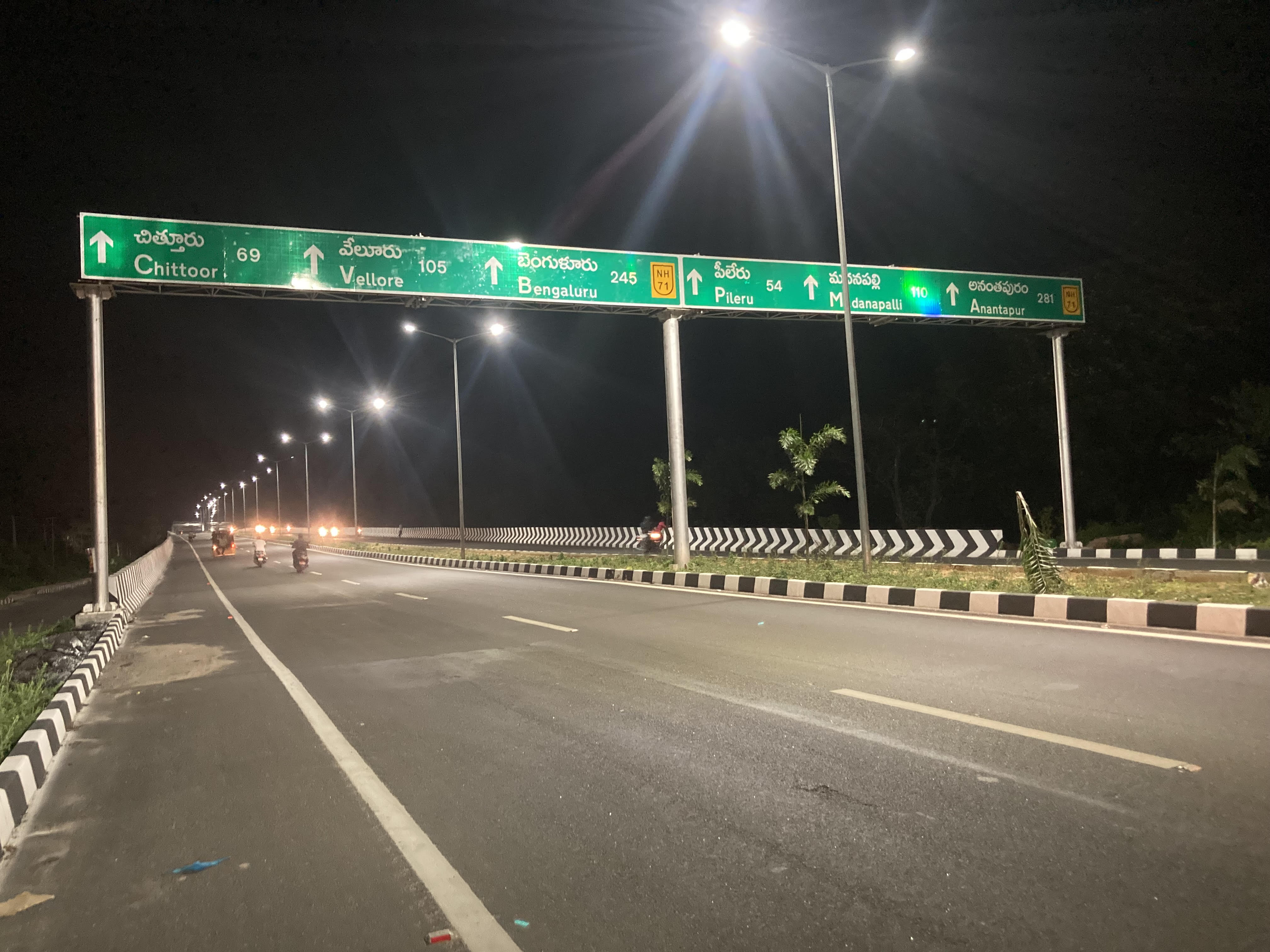
NH 71 View

== Route ==
Schematic map of National Highways in India

It starts at Madanapalle and passes through Vayalpad, Kalikiri, Pileru, Tirupati, Renigunta, and Yerpedu before it ends at Nayudupeta road. It has a route length of 190.6 km (118.4 mi).

== Chennai-Hyderabad Expressway Plan ==
NH71 is slated to be merged with NH716 & NH440 as part of Chennai-Hyderabad Expressway Project. Chennai-Hyderabad Expressway will start from Avadi near Chennai & run via Tiruvallur, Thiruttani, Renigunta, Tirupati, Pileru, Gurramkonda, Vempalli, Proddatur, Nandyala, Nandikotkur Alampur, Wanaparthy, Mahabubnagar, Vikarabad ending at Patancheruvu near Hyderabad on Outer Ring Road. The Expressway will cover 762 kilometres (473 mi) distance as per the DPR made under Bharatmala Project.

== Junctions ==
NH 42 Terminal near Madanapalle
NH 40 near Pileru
NH 140 near Tirupati
NH 716 near Renigunta
NH 565 near Yerpedu
NH 16 Terminal near Nayudupeta

== See also ==
- List of national highways in India
- List of national highways in India by state
