= Jenukallu betta, Sakleshpura =

Jenukallu Betta
- Location within Karnataka Location within India

Highest point
- Elevation: 1,383 m (4,537 ft)above Mean Sea Level
- Coordinates: 12°57′19.9116″N 75°37′1.7868″E

Geography
- Location: Sakleshpur Taluk, Hassan district, Karnataka, India
- Parent range: Western Ghats

Climbing
- Easiest route: Hike

Jenukallu Betta or Jenkal Peak is the highest mountain of Hassan district. It is located in the Western Ghats range near to Bisle valley, and reaches an elevation of 1,383 metres (4,537 ft). The mountain has patches of shola forests in the valleys.

It is a place of interest for trekkers. Trek trail begins from Shri Bettada Bhairaveshwara temple near Mekanagadde, which is 35 km from Sakleshpura. The climb to the top and back can be completed as a day hike.

== Rainfall ==
The region of Jenukallu hill comes under the jurisdiction of Hanbalu hobli of Sakleshpura taluk. As per Karnataka State Natural Disaster Monitoring Centre, in 2022, this region received a highest annual rainfall of 3,728 millimetres (146.8 in), second only to Hethur (4,305 mm) in the district.
