= Hanbalu, Hassan =

Hanbalu HanabaḶu
- Village
- Hanbalu
- Location in Karnataka, India
- Coordinates: 13.004766°N 75.696996°E
- Country: India
- State: Karnataka
- District: Hassan
- Taluk: Sakleshpura

Government
  - Body: Grama Panchayath

Area
  - Total: 5.25 km^{2} (2.03 sq mi)
- Elevation: 985 m (3,232 ft)

Population (2011)
  - Total: 2,468
  - Density: 470/km^{2} (1,220/sq mi)

Languages
  - Official: Kannada
- Time zone: UTC+5:30 (IST)
- PIN: 573165
- Telephone code: +91-8173
- Vehicle registration: KA-46

Hanbal or Hanbalu is a hobli in Sakleshpura taluk in Hassan district of Karnataka, India. As per census survey of India 2011, the location code number of Hanbalu village is 614849.

It lies on State Highway 107, between Sakleshpura and Jannapura. Hanbalu is located 17 km from taluk headquarter Sakleshpura, 57 km from district headquarter Hassan and 236 km from the state capital Bengaluru.

The nearest railway stations are Sakleshpura and Hassan Junction. The nearest airport is Mangalore International Airport.

Hassan's highest peak Jenukallu betta is around 20 km from Hanbalu village.

== Rainfall ==
In 2022, Hanbalu hobli received an annual rainfall of 3,728 millimetres (146.8 in), second highest in the district.
