= Chikkajajur =

Chikkajajur Chikjajur
- Census Town
- Location in Karnataka, India Chikkajajur (India)
- Coordinates: 14.123956°N 76.139776°E
- Country: India
- State: Karnataka
- District: Chitradurga
- Talukas: Holalkere

Area
  - Total: 9.48 km^{2} (3.66 sq mi)

Population (2011)
  - Total: 6,236
  - Density: 658/km^{2} (1,700/sq mi)

Languages
  - Official: Kannada
- Time zone: UTC+5:30 (IST)
- Postal code: 577523
- Vehicle registration: KA-16

Chikkajajur is a village in Holalkere taluk in Chitradurga district of Karnataka, India. It belongs to Bangalore Division. It is located 34 km west of its district headquarters Chitradurga, 10 km from Holalkere and 237 km from the state capital Bengaluru.

== Demographics ==
As of 2011, the town had a population of 6236 individuals; out of this 3024 were males and 3212 were female.

== Connectivity ==
The town lies on SH-47, which is now upgraded to NH-173. Chikkajajur is also a railway junction on Bangalore-Arsikere-Hubli line. Another line connects to Ballari via Chitradurga. Iron Ore and Manganese mines near Bedara Bommanahalli are directly connected by rail, to this junction for further transportation. Due to this, new Bhadravathi - Chikkajajur railway line is being planned to revive the VISL.

== See also ==
- Chitradurga
- Districts of Karnataka
