= National Highway 75 (India) =

National highway in India

National Highway 75
- Map of the National Highway in red
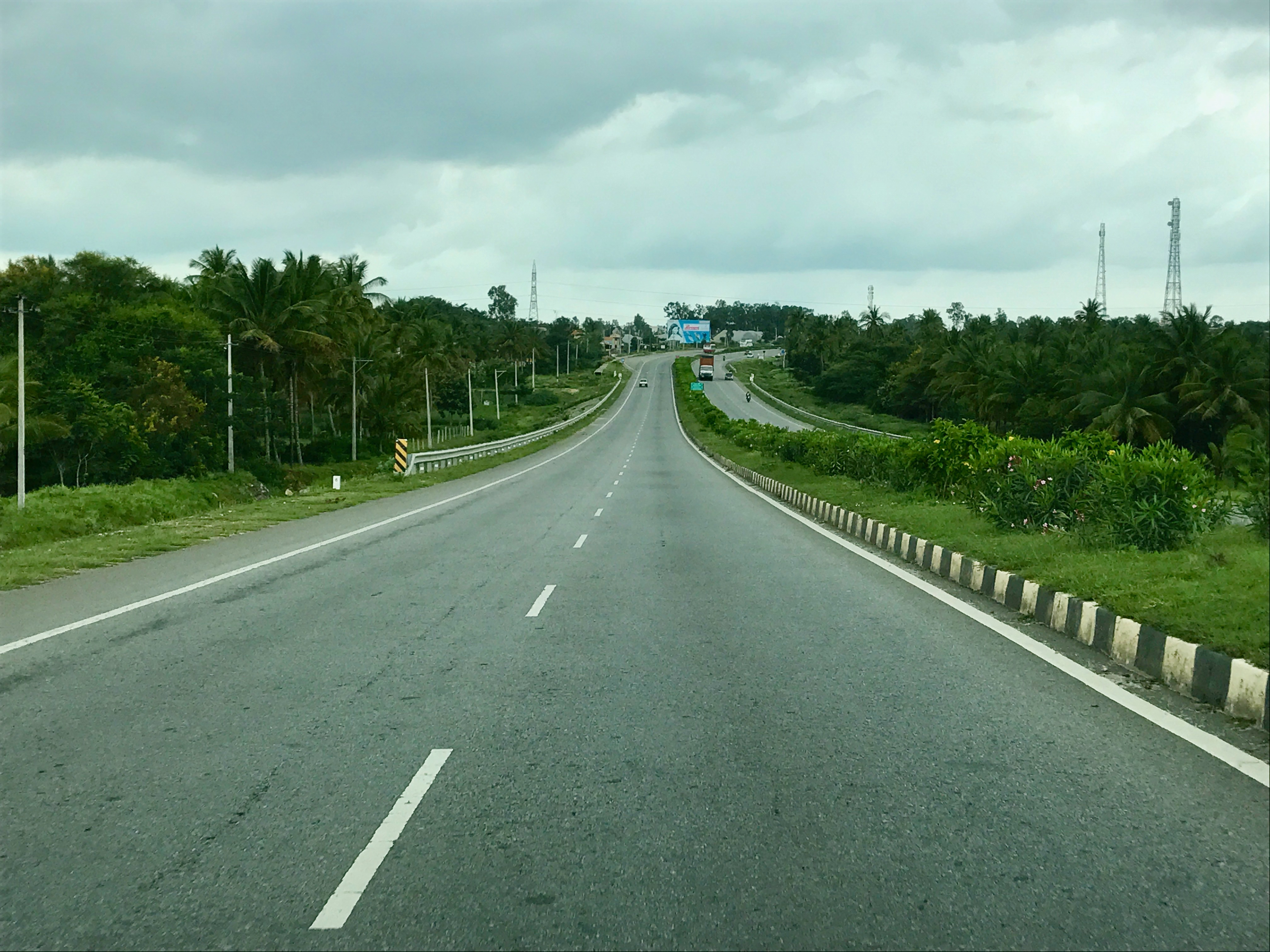
- NH 75 route in Karnataka

Route information
- Length: 567 km (352 mi)

Major junctions
- West end: NH 73 near Bantval, Karnataka
- East end: NH 40 at Kugaiyanallore near Katpadi, Tamil Nadu

Location
- Country: India
- States: Karnataka, Andhra Pradesh, Tamil Nadu
- Primary destinations: Uppinangady, Sakleshpur, Hassan, Channarayapatna, Kunigal, Nelamangala, Bengaluru, Kolar, Mulbagal, Venkatagirikota, Pernambut, Gudiyattam, Katpadi, Kugaiyanallore on NH 40

Highway system
- Roads in India; Expressways; National; State; Asian
← NH 74	→ NH 76

National Highway 75 (NH 75) is one of the major National Highway in India. passing through states of Karnataka, Andhra Pradesh, and Tamil Nadu. This national highway was earlier known as National Highway 48 (NH-48) before rationalisation of highway numbers in 2010. The highway connects the port city of Mangaluru (Mangalore) in the west to the city of Vellore in the east. National highway 75 is the main road for travellers from Mangaluru going to Bengaluru and Hassan. NH-75 traverses all three geographical regions of Karnataka state namely Karavali, Malenadu and Bayaluseeme.

== Renamed roads ==
KA SH 54 (Belur Road), NH 373, NH 69

== Route ==
Schematic map of National Highways in India

It starts from NH 73 at Bantwal in Karnataka state and passes through Nellyadi, Shiradi ghat, Sakleshpura, Hassan, Channarayapatna, Yediyur, Kunigal, Bengaluru, Kolar, Mulbagal, Venkatagirikota, Pernambut, Gudiyattam, Katpadi before terminating at NH 40 at Kugaiyanallore near Katpadi in Tamil Nadu. This highway bypasses Hassan, Channarayapatna, Kunigal and Kolar main town areas. The under construction Bharatmala National Expressway 7 connecting Chennai and Bengaluru will run parallelly to NH 75.

State–wise route length in km.

- Karnataka - 418.7 km (260.2 mi)
- Andhra Pradesh – 62.55 km (38.87 mi)
- Tamil Nadu - 85.75 km (53.28 mi)

== Junctions ==
NH 73 Terminal near Bantwal.
NH 275 near Bantwal
NH 373 near Hassan
NH 150A at Bellur Cross
NH 48 near Nelamangala
NH 44 near Hebbal
NH 340 near Hoskote
NH 648 near Hoskote
NH 69 near Mulbagal
NH 42 near Venkatagirikota
NH 40 Terminal near Kugaiyanallore.

== See also ==
- List of national highways in India
- List of national highways in India by state
- National Highways Development Project
- National Highway 169 (India)
- National Highway 66 (India)
- Ghat Roads
