= Lakshminarasimha Temple, Javagal =

Lakshmi Narasimha Swamy Temple
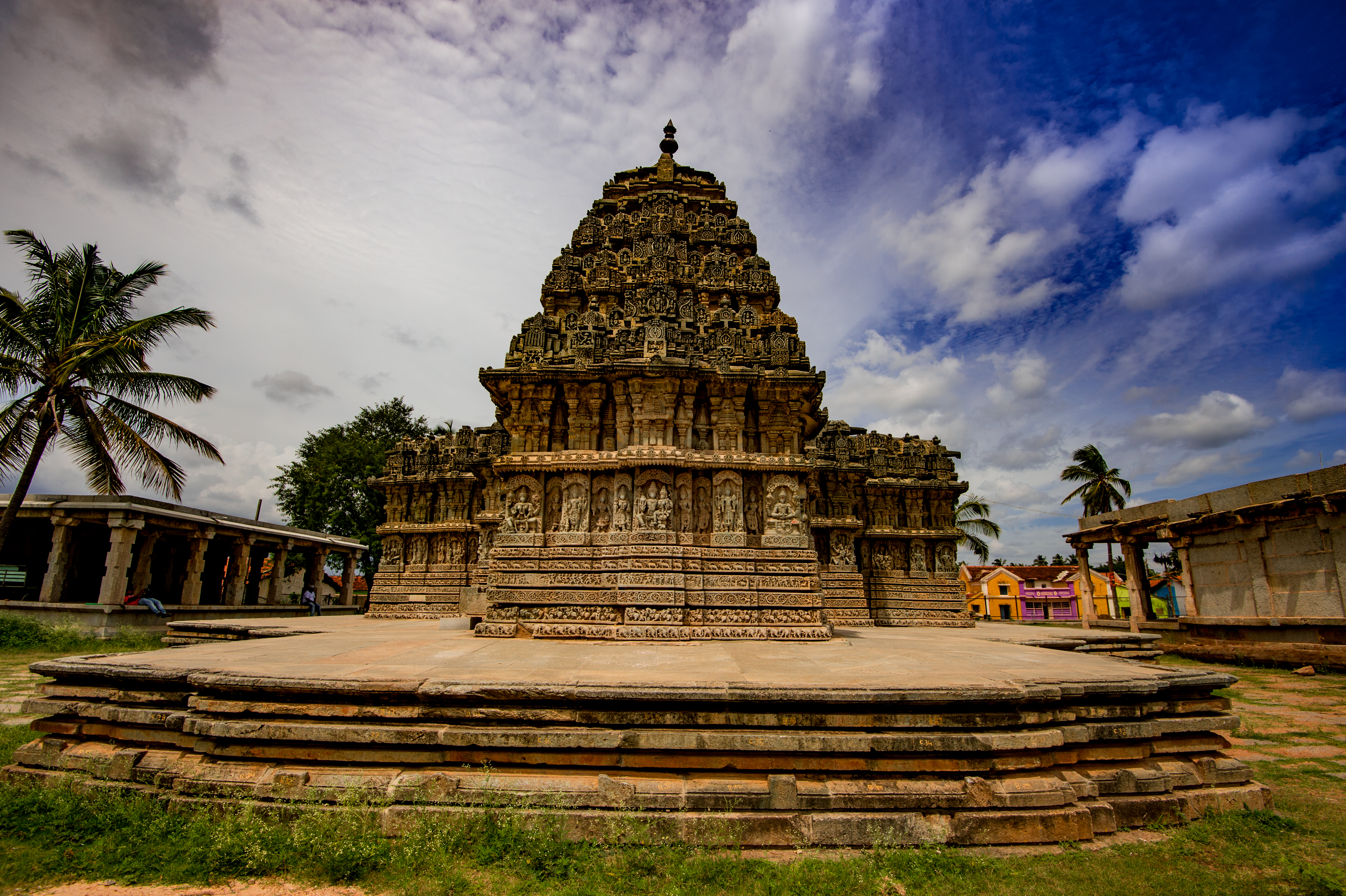

- Location within India Location within Karnataka

Religion
- Affiliation: Hinduism
- District: Hassan
- Deity: Lakshmi Narasimha

Location
- Location: Javagal
- State: Karnataka
- Country: India
- Coordinates: 13°18′03.6″N 76°03′36.3″E

Architecture
- Type: Hoysala
- Creator: Vira Someshwara
- Completed: c. 1250 CE

The Lakshminarasimha temple at Javagal, sometimes referred to as Lakshmi Narasimha temple of Javagallu, is a mid-13th century Hindu temple with Hoysala architecture. It is located in Javagal, Arsikere taluk about 20 km northeast from Halebidu and 50 km from Hassan city, Karnataka state, India. This triple shrine temple is dedicated to Narasimha – the man-lion avatar of Vishnu. It was completed between 1250 and 1260 CE by King Vira Someshwara of the Hoysala Empire.

The temple is a compact illustration of a square plan typical of Hindu temple architecture, but one where the three sanctums share a common mandapa (hall). These sanctums are dedicated to Lakshminarasimha, Sridhara, and Venugopala. It is notable for its lavish artwork consisting of over 100 panels, all intricately carved both outside and inside. Many of these panels depict legends from the Ramayana.

This temple is a protected monument under the Karnataka state division of the Archaeological Survey of India.

== Date ==
The foundation stone and inscription of the Lakshminarasimha temple of Javagal is missing. This temple cannot therefore be directly dated. However, one can infer its date from the signatures carved into some of the panels. Some of them are signatures of the famed 13th-century sculptor Mallitamma known for his exquisite artwork elsewhere. Such evidence suggests that this temple was complete by about 1260 CE.

== Architecture ==
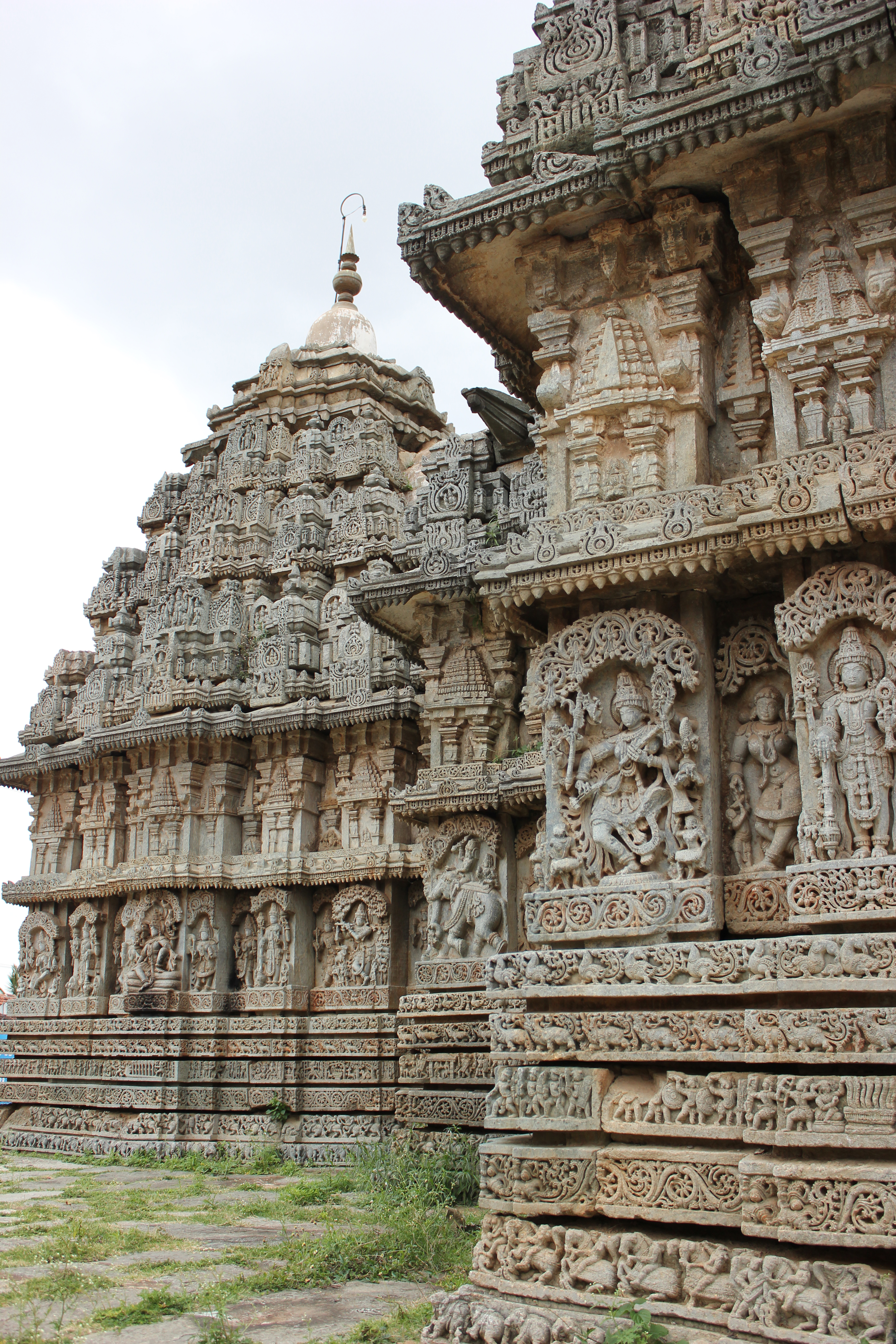
The outer walls and shikara of the Lakshminarasimha temple at Javagal.

The temple plan is square, similar to other Hoysala temples. It is a trikuta (three shrined) temple, one where only the middle shrine has a superstructure (tower or shikhara) and a sukhanasi (nose or tower over the vestibule). The three equal size shrines are all square in plan and are connected by a common closed hall (mantapa). The closed hall is preceded by an open porch. The lateral shrines are connected directly to the hall while the middle shrine has a vestibule that connects the sanctum (cella) to the hall.

The lateral shrines have no tower over them and are directly connected to the hall without a vestibule and its corresponding tower like projection. This makes the temple appear as if it has just one shrine from the outside with bulging walls. In reality, inside are three shrines. The central shrine is highly visible from the outside because of its tower, and the sukhanasi that projects prominently from the tower. The lower part of the shrines (below the roof) have five projections per side, these projections being visible on three sides in the case of the central shrine but only on one side in the case of the lateral shrines.

The temple stands on a platform (jagati), a feature common to many Hoysala temples. The platform, in addition to its visual appeal, is meant to provide devotees a path for circumambulation (pradakshinapatha) around the temple. It closely follows the outline of the temple, giving it an elevated look. The tower over the central shrine and the vestibule are intact and highly decorative. Other standard features in a Hoysala temple are the large domed roof over the tower, which is also the largest sculptural piece in a Hoysala temple (called the "helmet" or amalaka) and whose shape usually follows that of the shrine (square or star shape); the kalasa on top of it (the decorative water-pot at the apex of the dome); and the Hoysala crest (emblem of the Hoysala warrior stabbing a lion) over the sukhanasi. Here the emblem and the kalasa are missing. The kalasa has been replaced during later times with a metallic pinnacle.

=== Decoration and sculptures ===
The decorative plan of the outer walls of the shrines and the mantapa (hall) is Hoysala style, with two eaves that run around the temple. According to art historian Gerard Foekema, the wall panel images (one hundred and forty in all), and the reliefs and friezes that abound in this temple have a relaxed quality of workmanship about them, and appear more "folkish in character". Here, the first heavy eaves runs below the superstructure and all around the temple with a projection of about half a meter. The second eaves runs around the temple about a meter below the first. In between the two eaves are the miniature decorative towers (Aedicula) on pilasters. Below the second eaves are the wall panel of images of Hindu deities and their attendants in relief. Below this, at the base are the six equal width rectangular moldings (frieze). Starting from the top, the friezes depict; hansa (birds) in the first frieze, makara (aquatic monsters) in the second, epics and other stories in the third (usually from the Hindu epic Ramayana, the Mahabharata, and stories of Krishna), leafy scrolls in the fourth, horses in the fifth and elephants in the sixth (bottom frieze).

== Gallery ==
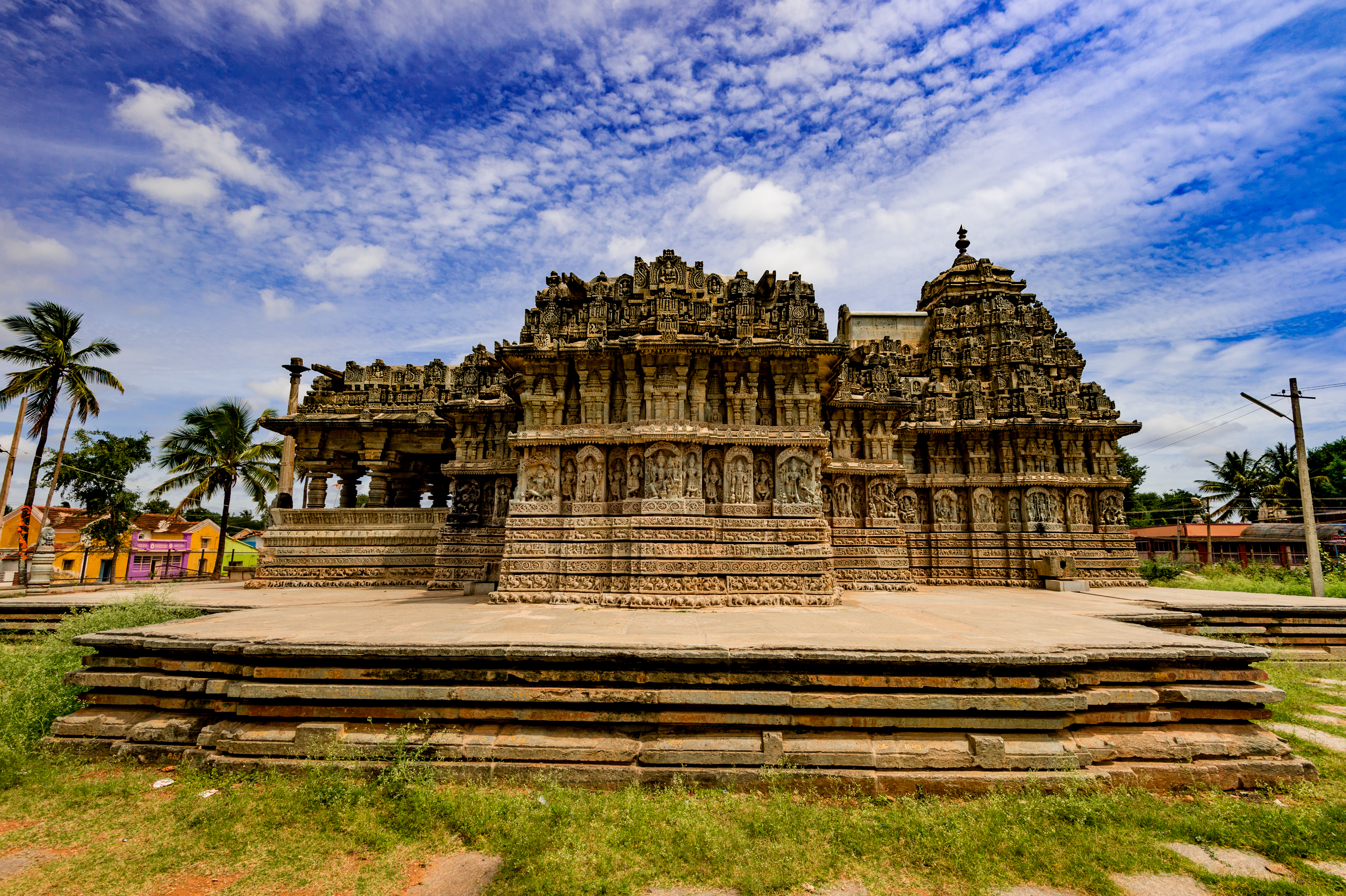
Lakshminarasimha temple at Javagal - north view

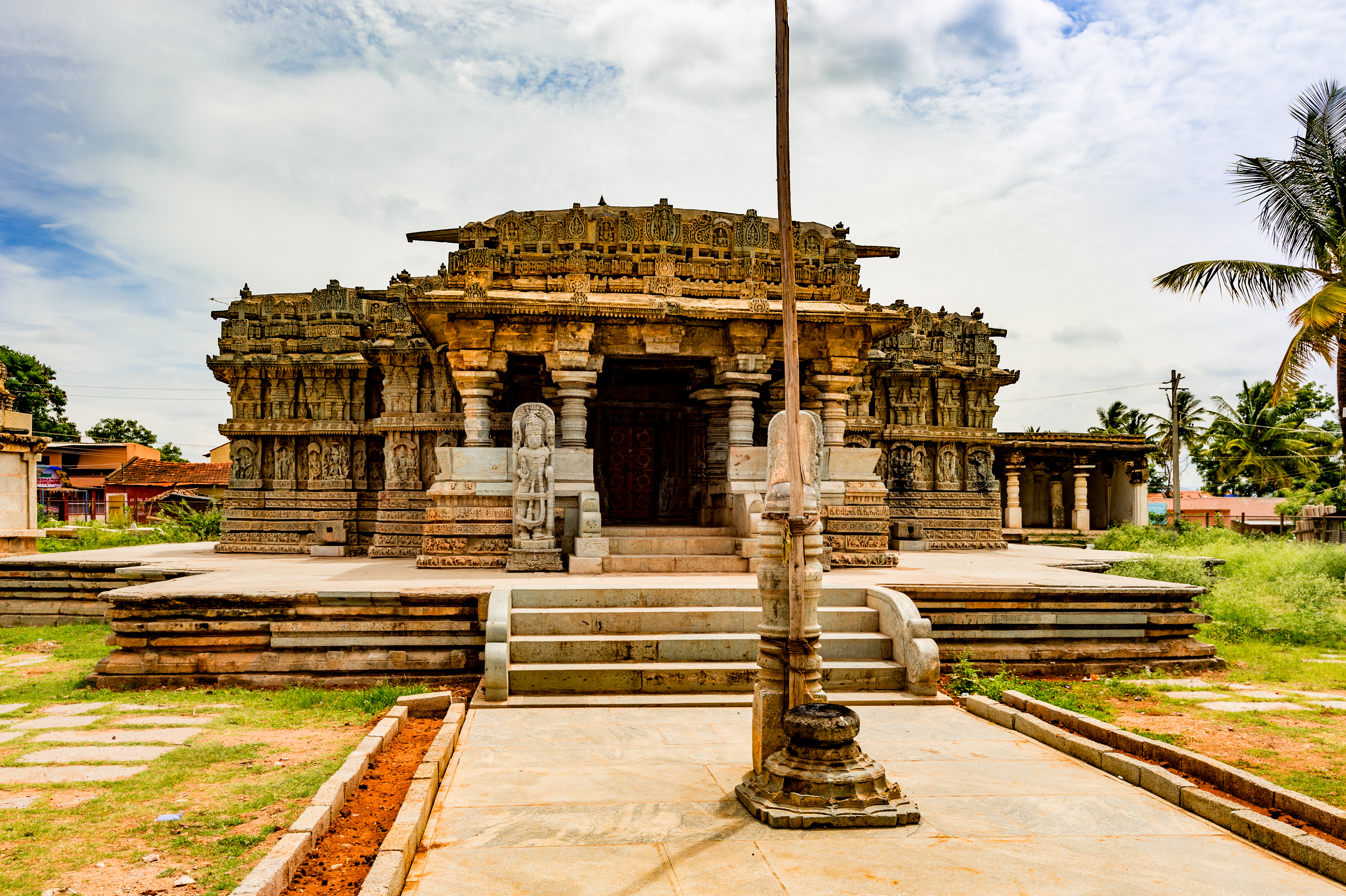
Front

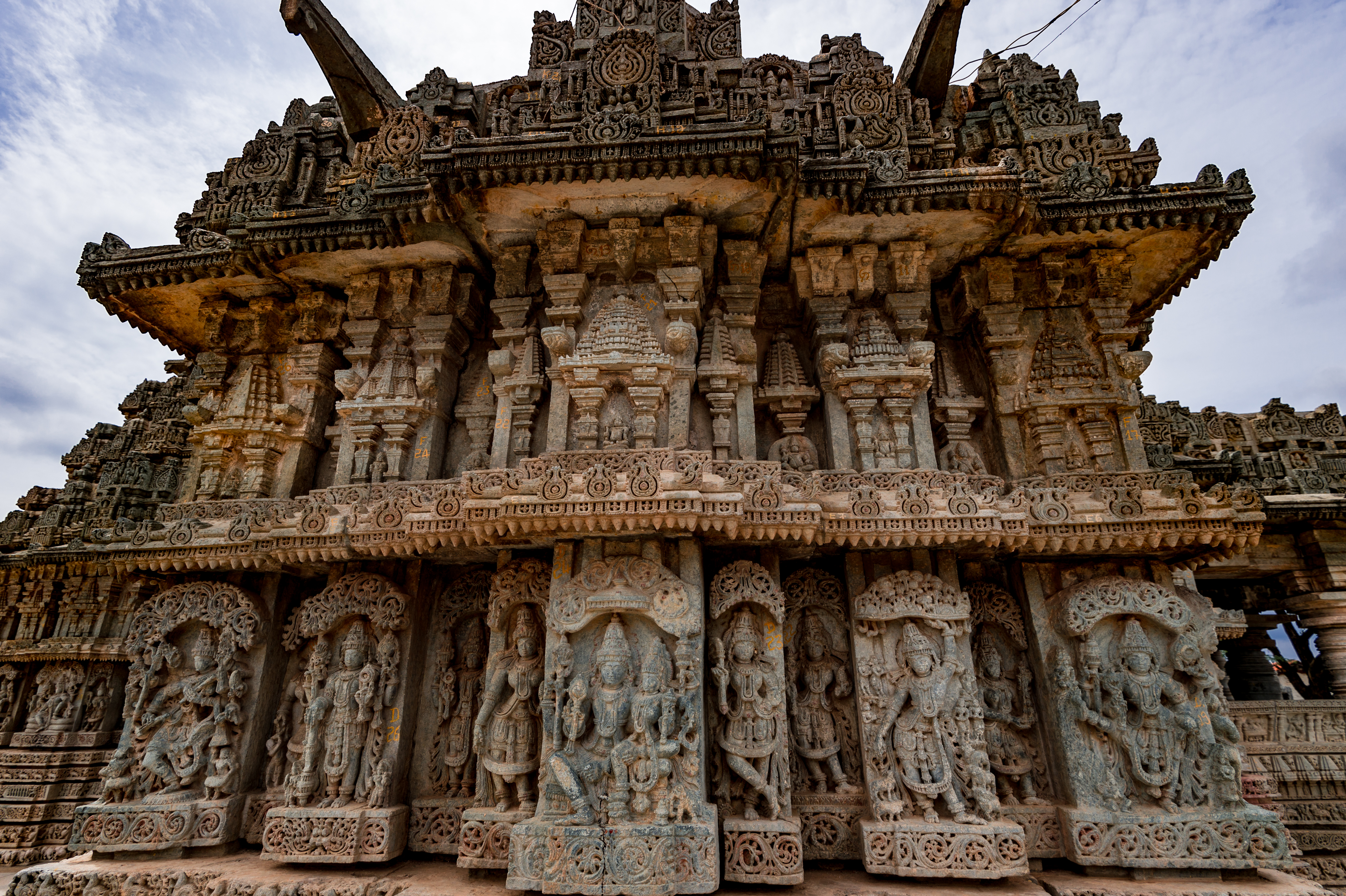

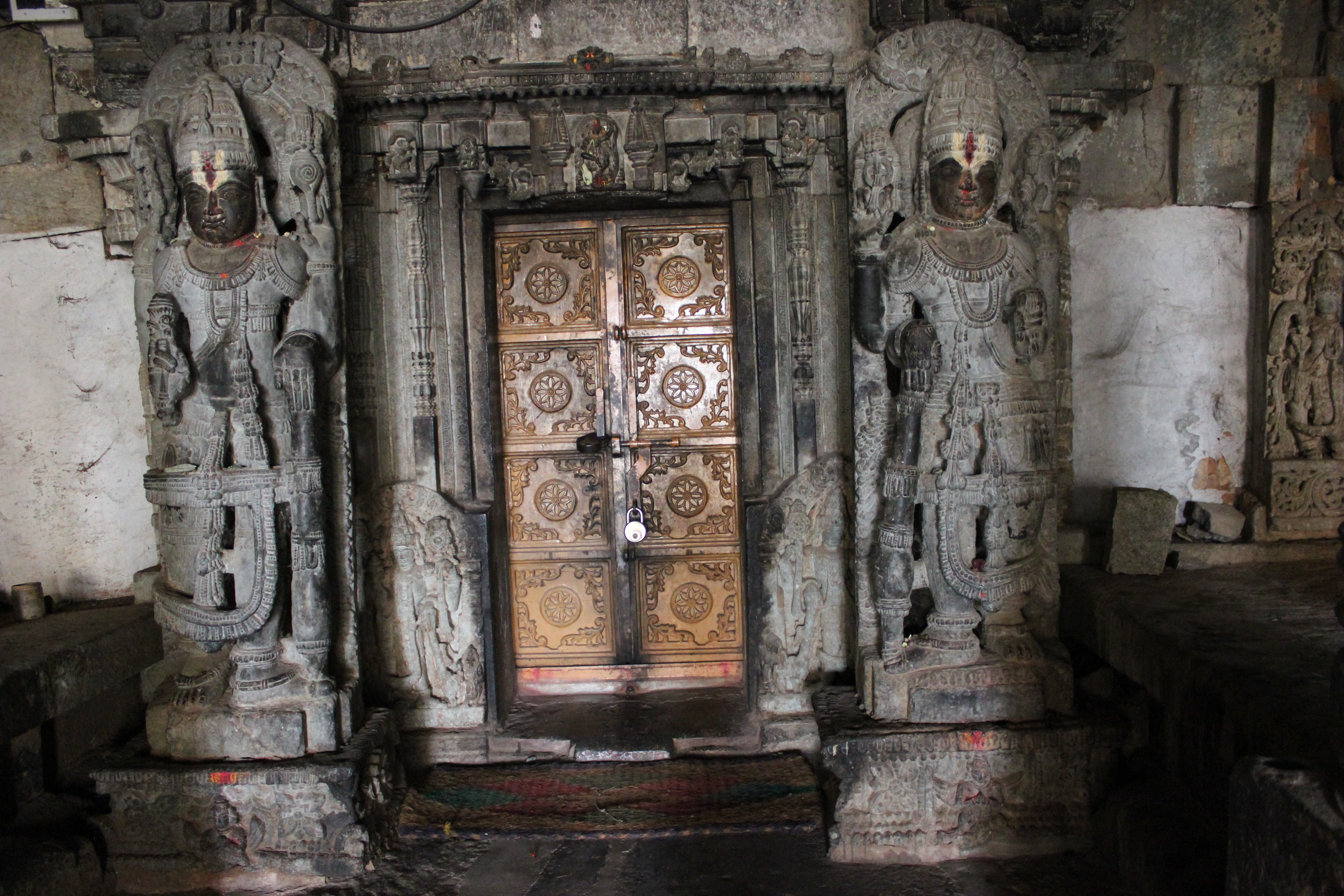
Entrance to mantapa (gathering hall) has dvarapalas (door keepers) in Lakshminarasimha temple at Javagal

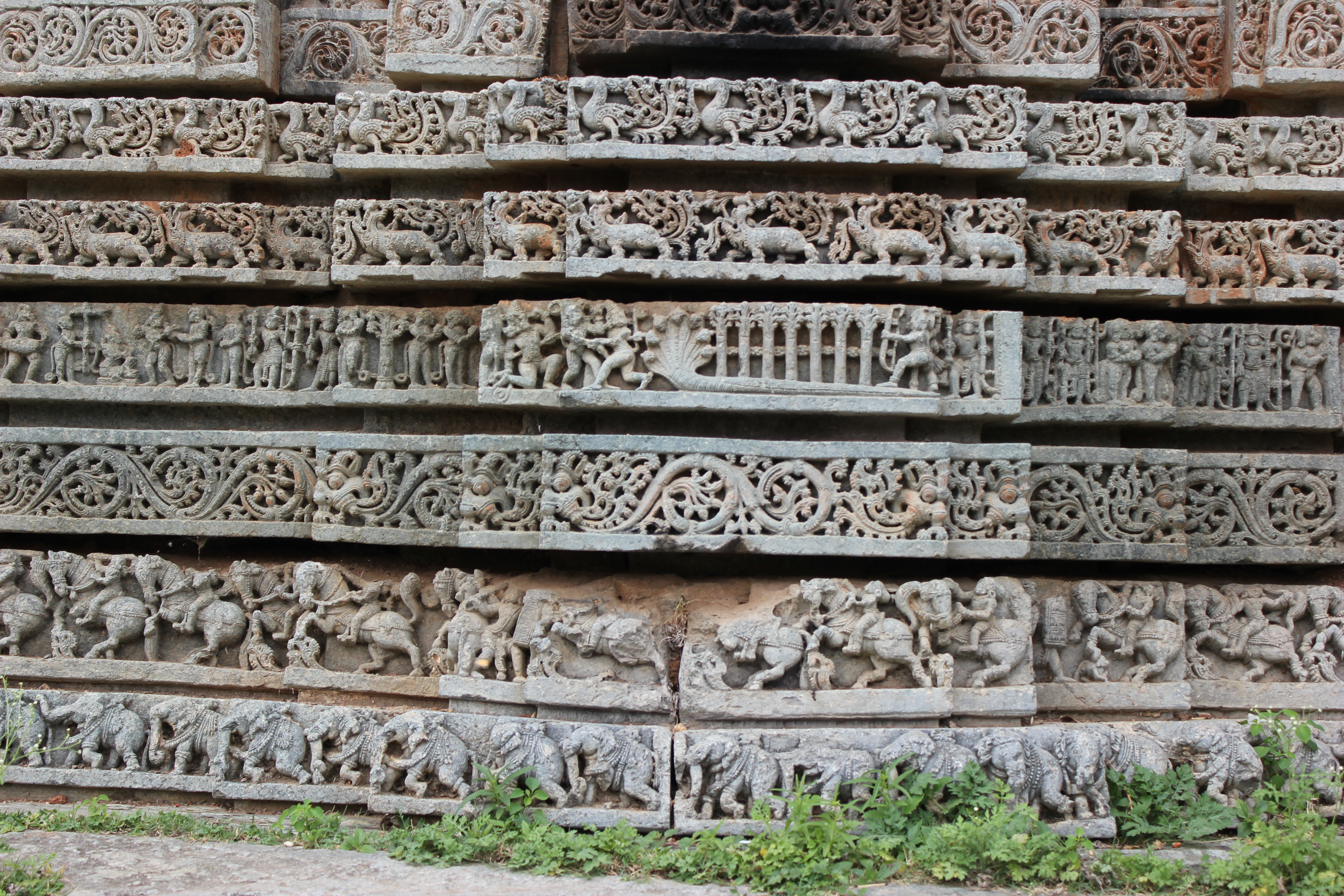
Six molding friezes

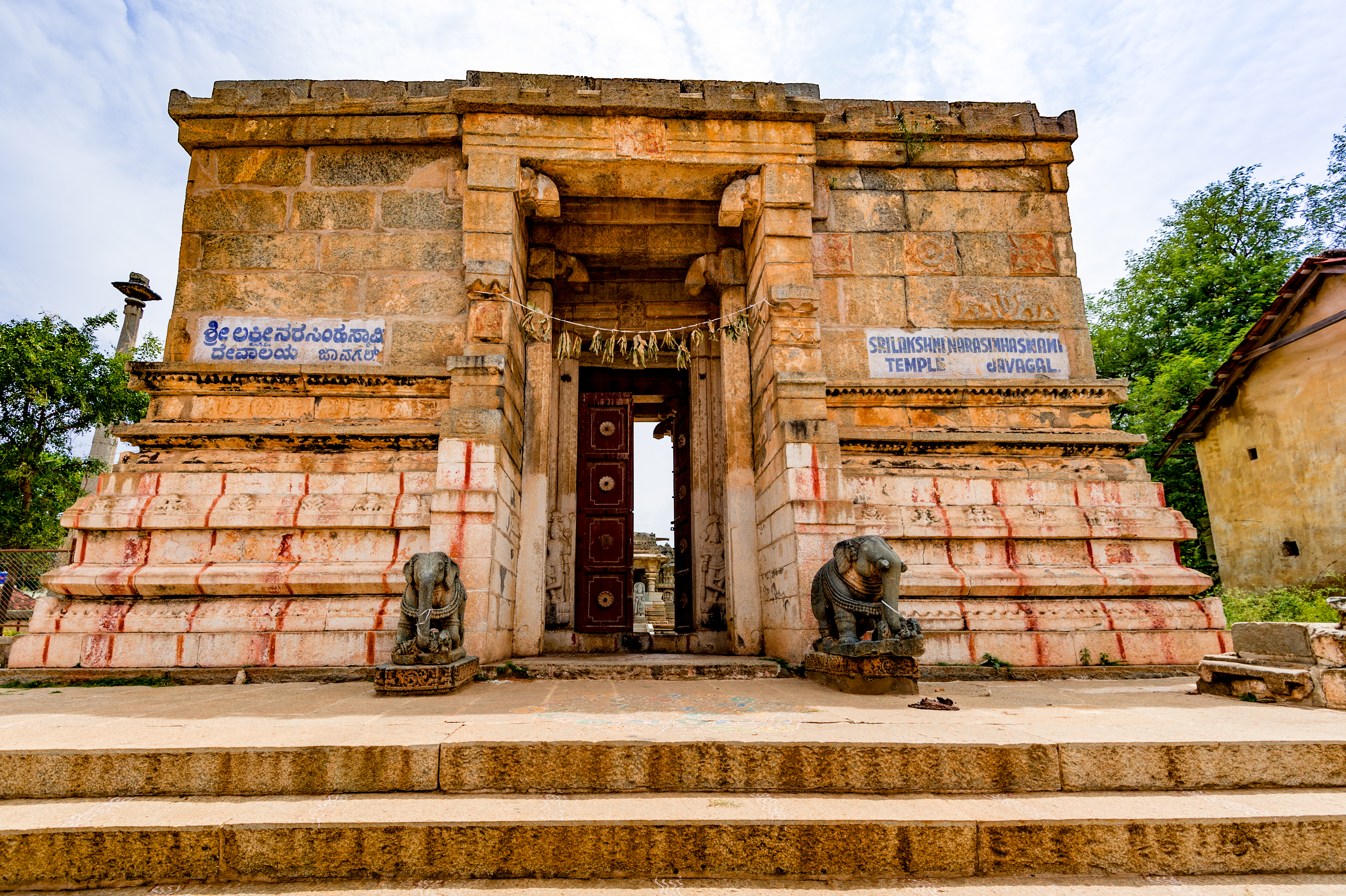
Entrance (mahadwara)

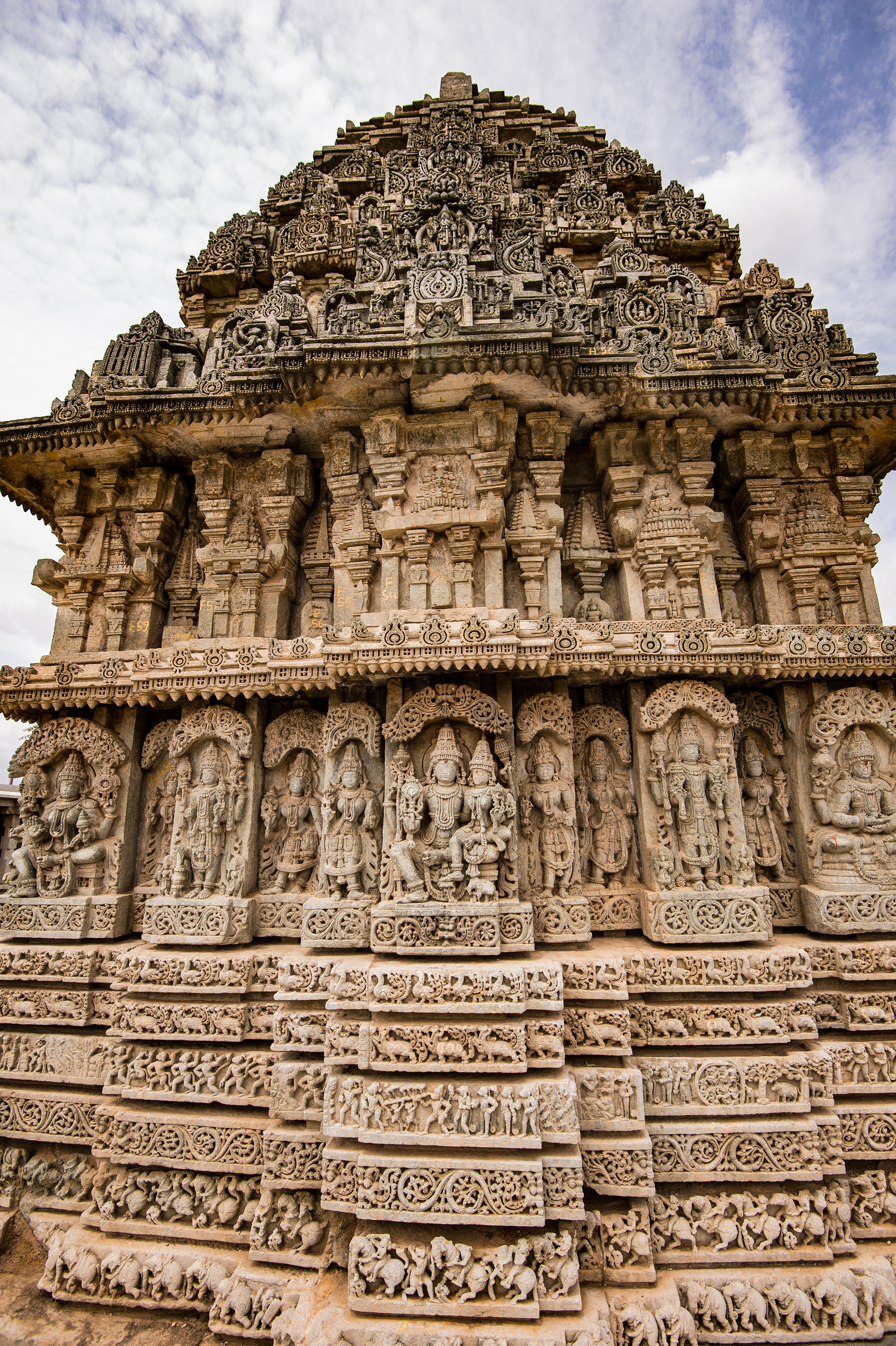
The vimana
