= Hindupur =

- City
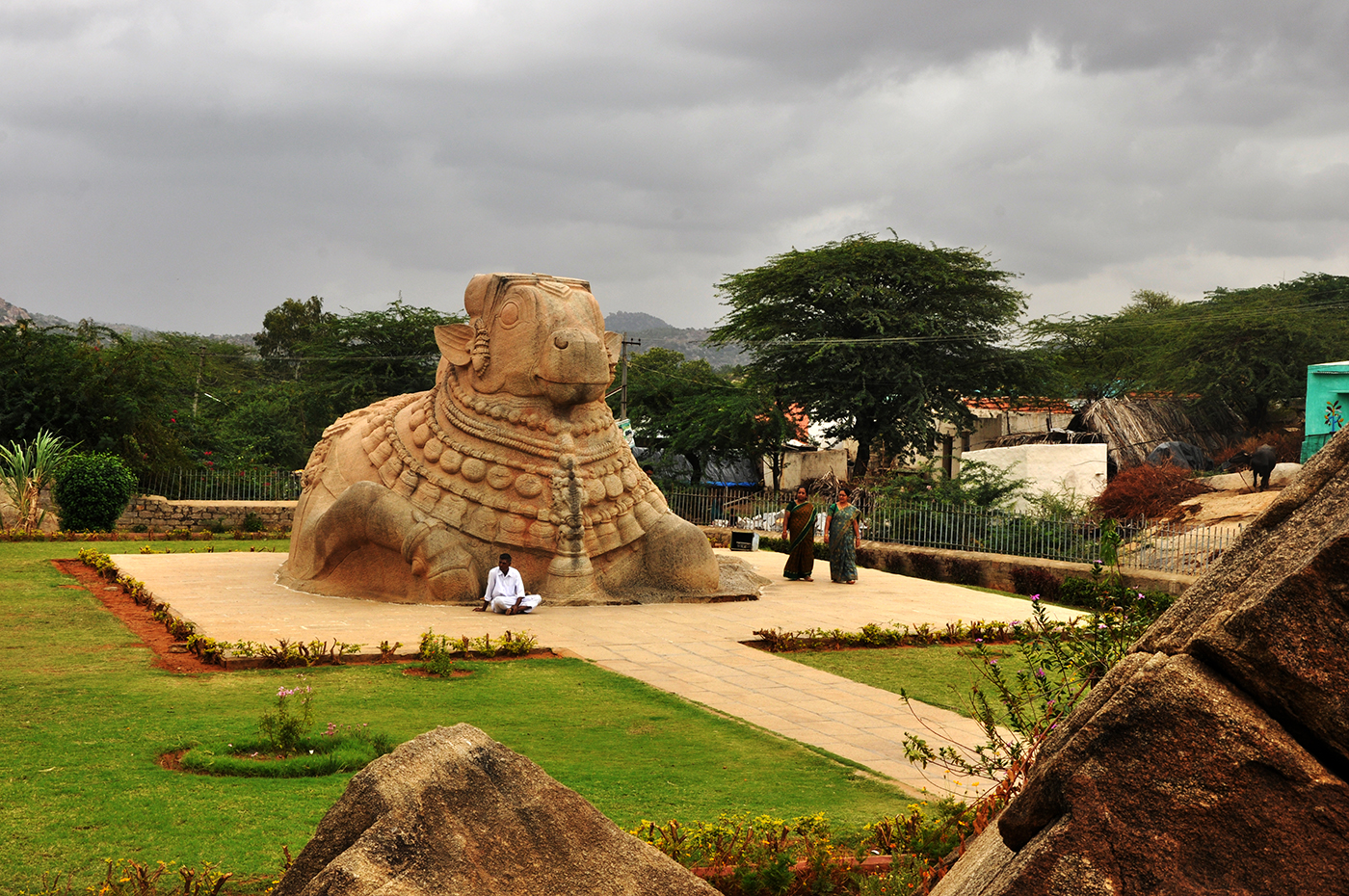
- Nandi Lepakshi temple

- Location in Andhra Pradesh, India
- Coordinates: 13.8300°N 77.4900°E
- Country: India
- State: Andhra Pradesh
- District: Sri Sathya Sai
- Founder: Sri Murari Rao

Government
  - Type: Municipal council
  - Body: Hindupuram Municipality & Anantapuramu–Hindupur Urban Development Authority (AHUDA)

Area
  - Total: 38.16 km^{2} (14.73 sq mi)
  - Rank: 20th
- Elevation: 621 m (2,037 ft)

Population (2011 census)
  - Total: 151,677
  - Rank: 275th (India); 21st (in state)
  - Density: 3,975/km^{2} (10,290/sq mi)

Languages
  - Official: Telugu
- Time zone: UTC5:30 (IST)
- PIN: 515201/02
- Telephone code: 91–8556
- Vehicle registration: AP–02
- Website: hindupur.cdma.ap.gov.in

Hindupur, also known as Hindupuram located in Sri Sathya Sai district of the Indian state of Andhra Pradesh. It is the headquarters of Hindupuram mandalam. Hindupuram is the Parliamentary Constituency in the newly formed Sri Sathya Sai district. It is located about 619 km from Amaravati, the capital of Andhra Pradesh, 67 km from district headquarters Puttaparthi.

As of 2011, Hindupuram municipality had a population of 151,835. It is an important local pilgrimage center with a number of temples in and around the city, including Sri Peta Venkata Ramana Swamy Temple, Sree Vasavi Kanyaka Parameshwari Temple, Guddam Sri Ranganath Swamy Temple, Sugur Sri Anjaneya Swamy Temple, and the historical Lepakshi Sri Veerabhadra Swamy Temple.

Hindupuram is connected to the major cities in the region by road and by train. This includes National Highway 44, Bangalore Highway [KA SH 9], Parigi Road, Lepakshi Road National Highway 544E (India), Kadiri Road National Highway 716G (India), and Penukonda Road. Hindupur Railway Station (code – 'HUP') in the Bengaluru City Railway Station KSR Bengaluru stretch of the South Western Railway zone is one of the busiest in the route. The Penukonda–Hindupur and Hindupur Industrial Area maintained by Andhra Pradesh Industrial Infrastructure Corporation and Hindupur's surrounding stretch has a number of industries involved in manufacturing, pharmaceutical, automobile and IT which makes Hindupur an industrial town in the state.

== Etymology ==
Legendary accounts say that Hindupur (Hindupuram) was founded by and named after Hindu Rao, the father of Maratha General Murari Rao Ghorpade.

== Climate and rainfall ==
Even in summers, the city experiences lower temperatures compared to the rest of the state due to its high elevation. Every year, the lowest temperature is around 13°C and highest temperature will be around 41°C. Average annual rainfall is 551mm.

== Geography ==
Hindupur is located at 13.83°N 77.49°E on the banks of Penna River. It has an average elevation of 2,037 feet (621 metres).

== Demographics ==
As of the 2011 Census of India, the city had a population of 151,677, an increase of about 25,000 compared to the previous census in 2001, when it was 125,074. The population recorded in the 2011 census was made up of 76,625 males and 75,210 females — a sex ratio of 982 females per 1000 males, which is higher than the national average of 940 per 1000. 16,309 children were in the age group of 0–6 years, of which 8,263 were boys and 8,046 were girls. The average literacy rate stood at 76.40% with 103,538 literates, significantly higher than the state average of 67.41%. Telugu is the official and spoken language.

Religions in Hindupuram City based on 2011 Census
Religion	Percent
Hinduism	64.28%
Islam	34.62%
Other or not stated	1.10%
Distribution of religions

Languages of Hindupuram City based on 2011 Census
1. Telugu (60.8%)
2. Urdu (34.4%)
3. Kannada (1.72%)
4. Tamil (1.50%)
5. Hindi (0.94%)
6. Others (0.64%)

== Economy ==
Clothes and retail are the most significant businesses, along with food producers and wholesalers. The Famous 3 Spinning mills which provides large employment were closed recently. The town has largest Agriculture Produce Market which gets tamarind, chillies from Andhra Pradesh and Karnataka. The town has also largest Cocoon market also, farmers bring cocoon from Sri Satya Sai District and Karnataka state to sell their produce.

== Government and politics ==
Hindupuram municipality was formed in the year 1920. In 2018, it was upgraded to Selection Grade, the municipality had been a Special Grade Municipality. It has an extent of 38.16 km^{2} (14.73 mi^{2}).

== Transport ==
The Andhra Pradesh State Road Transport Corporation operates bus services from Hindupur bus station. Hindupur railway station is administered under the Bangalore division of the South Western Railway zone. It is located in the Guntakal–Bangalore section of Indian Railways. A new railway line Hindupur to Chitradurga with a length of 132 km. was sanctioned for survey in 2017-18, later the line was cancelled. another new railway line Cuddapah-Hindupur via Kadiri (Kadapa-Hindupur via Kadiri) with a length of 236 km. survey also completed in 2019-20 and later cancelled due to political negligence on Hindupur Town. The nearest Airport is Kempegowda International Airport, which is 90 km away and Sri Sathya Sai Airport, which is 70 km away.. Recently DPR was awarded for construction of Semi Ring Road in Hindupur, which is expected to improve transportation.

== Education ==
There are many government and privately administered schools across the city. The primary and secondary school education is imparted by government aided and private schools, under the School Education Department of the state. There are government aided institutions like Government Polytechnic, Hindupur and other private and government degree colleges and one private Diploma college. Despite being the biggest in the district, the town does not have a Government Intermediate College or a Government Degree College, for Engineering Graduate courses one has to go to Anantapur or Bengaluru. The town has been poor in higher education and technical infrastructure due to political indifference by the state local parties. Schools teach in languages, including Telugu, English, and Urdu.

== See also ==
- List of cities in Andhra Pradesh
- List of cities in India by population
