= Renigunta =

- Neighbourhood of Tirupati
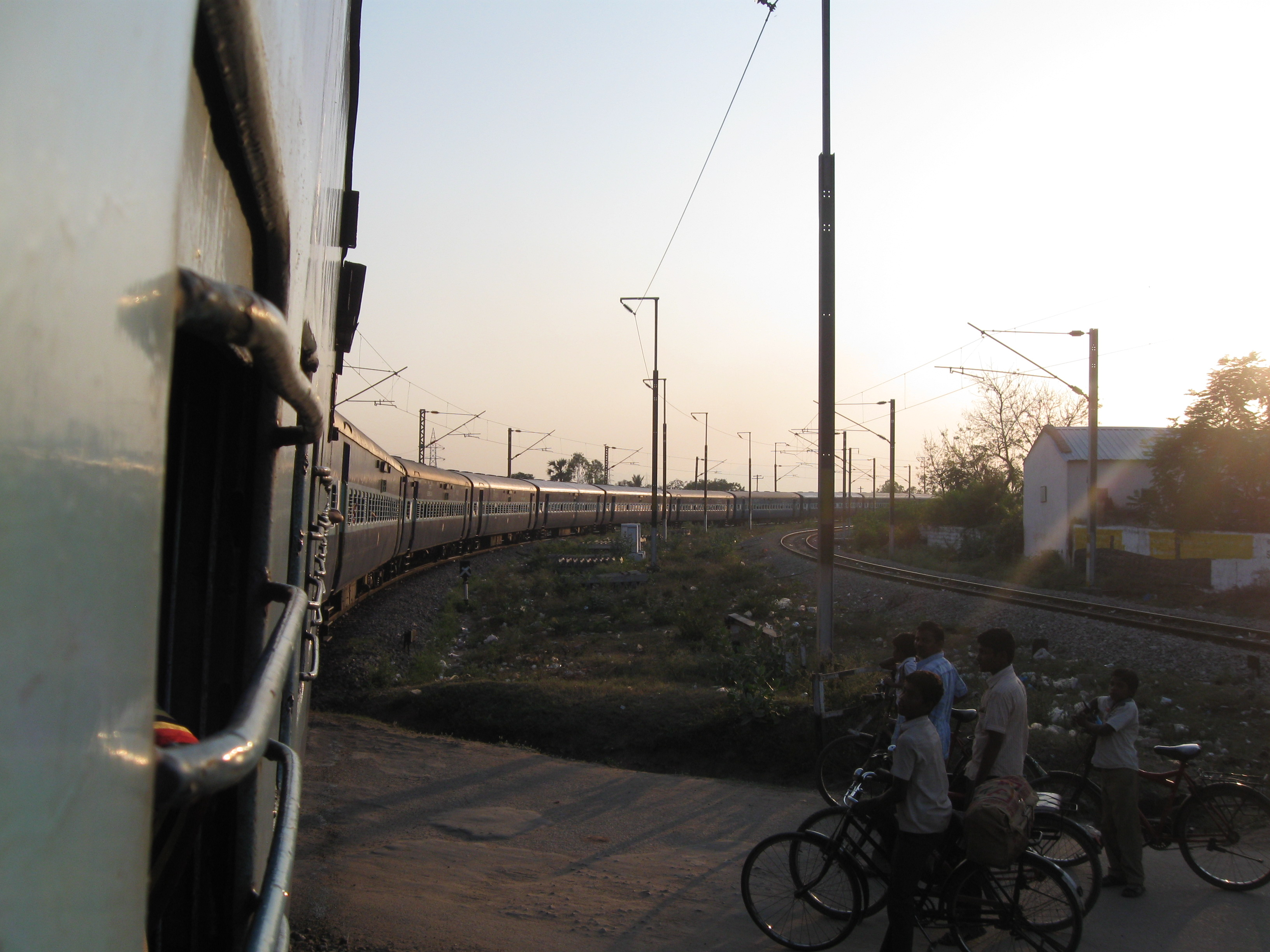
- Padmavathi Express near Renigunta

- Location in Andhra Pradesh, India
- Coordinates: 13.65°N 79.52°E
- Country: India
- State: Andhra Pradesh
- District: Tirupati
- City: Tirupati

Government
  - Body: Tirupati Urban Development Authority(TUDA)
- Elevation: 107 m (351 ft)

Population (2011)
  - Total: 26,031
- Time zone: UTC+5:30 (IST)
- PIN: 517520
- Telephone code: +91–877
- Vehicle registration: AP–03

Renigunta is a suburb and outgrowth of Tirupati located in Tirupati district of the Indian state of Andhra Pradesh. It is a part of Tirupati urban agglomeration. Tirupati Airport is located in Renigunta. It is also one of the mandals in Tirupati district. It also falls in the jurisdictional limit of Tirupati Urban Development Authority.

== Transport ==
It has road connectivity by means of national and state highways. Kadapa Chennai National Highway 716 (India) NH 716 connects Tirupati with Chennai in Tamil Nadu and National Highway 71 that connects Madanapalle with Nayudupeta also passes through it. Bus services operated by APSRTC provides local transport for the people. Renigunta Junction is one of the main junctions that connects Chennai-Bangalore line and the Guntakal–Chennai Egmore section of Mumbai–Chennai line. It is also connected to Gudur on the Vijayawada-Chennai line of Howrah-Chennai main line. Tirupati Airport serves passengers of Tirupati.

== Education ==
The primary and secondary school education is imparted by government, aided and private schools, under the School Education Department of the state. The medium of instruction followed by different schools are English, Telugu.
