= National Highway 169 (India) =

National highway in India

National Highway 169
- Map of National Highway 169 in red

Route information
- Length: 200 km (120 mi)

Major junctions
- From: Shivamogga
- To: Mangalore

Location
- Country: India
- States: Karnataka
- Primary destinations: Tirthahalli – Koppa – Sringeri – Karkala – Moodabidre

Highway system
- Roads in India; Expressways; National; State; Asian
← NH 168	→ NH 170

National Highway 169 (NH 169) is a National Highway in India. The national highway number 169 was previously part of old National highway 13 connecting Mangaluru ( Mangalore ) in the state of Karnataka with Solapur in the state of Maharashtra. After rationalisation of highway numbers by Government of India published on 5 March 2010. This number has been assigned to national highway starting from Mangalooru to Shivamogga (Shimoga) going via Gurupura, Kaikamba, Yedapadavu, Moodabidri, Karkala, Bajagoli (Bajegoli), SK border, Kerekatte, Sringeri, Koppa and Thirthahalli. This road provides connectivity between Karavali (Coastal) region through Malenadu region of Karnataka state in India. This road is narrow at some stretches when passing through Kudremukha National Park forest area. The National Highway 169A joins this highway at Thirthahalli.

== See also ==
- National Highway 169A (India)
- National Highway 66 (India)
- National Highway 75 (India)
- National Highway 73 (India)
- National Highway 275 (India)
- Ghat Roads
- List of state highways in Karnataka
