= National Highway 42 (India) =

National highway in southern India

National Highway 42
- Map of the National Highway in red

Route information
- Length: 401 km (249 mi)

Major junctions
- North end: NH 67 in Joladarashi
- List: NH 44 / NH 544DD / NH 544F / AH43 in Anantapur; NH 342 in Mudigubba; NH 716G in Kadiri; NH 340 in Angallu; NH 71 in Madanapalle; NH 69 in Palamaneru; NH 75 in Venkatagirikota
- South end: NH 48 in Krishnagiri

Location
- Country: India
- States: Karnataka; Andhra Pradesh; Tamil Nadu
- Primary destinations: Anantapur, Kadiri, Madanapalle, Punganur, Venkatagirikota, Palamaner, Kuppam

Highway system
- Roads in India; Expressways; National; State; Asian
← NH 67	→ NH 48

National Highway 42 (NH 42), (previously part of old National Highways 205 and 219), is a major National Highway in India, that runs in the states of Karnataka, Andhra Pradesh and Tamil Nadu. The northern terminal is at the National Highway 67 junction east of Ballari inside Karnataka state and the southern terminal is at a junction with National Highway 48 near Krishnagiri in Tamil Nadu.

== Route ==
Schematic map of National Highways in India

In Karnataka, it passes through Joladarashi chellagurki in bellary district.

In Andhra Pradesh, it passes through Anantapur, Kadiri, Madanapalle, Punganur, Palamaner, Venkatagirikota and Kuppam.

In Tamil Nadu, it connects Krishnagiri with its junction with NH 44.

Route length in states:

- Karnataka - 4 km (2.5 mi)
- Andhra Pradesh – 378 km (235 mi)
- Tamil Nadu – 19 km (12 mi)

== See also ==
- List of national highways in India
- List of national highways in India by state
