= National Highway 169A (India) =

National highway in India

National Highway 169A
- Map of the National Highway in red

Route information
- Length: 87 km (54 mi)

Major junctions
- From: Thirthahalli
- To: Udupi

Location
- Country: India
- Primary destinations: Agumbe – Hebri

Highway system
- Roads in India; Expressways; National; State; Asian
← NH 169	→ NH 66

National Highway 169A (NH 169A) is a National Highway in India, which comes under Ministry of Road Transport & Highways, Government of India. The highway starts from Malpe harbour in Udupi and ends at Thirthahalli. Its old name was NH 766E.

Though classified as national highway the width of this road is very less at many stretches. The stretches where road width is very less are Malpe to Karavali By-pass, Manipal to Perdoor and Someshwara to Agumbe where only mini buses and mini lorry are allowed. The NH-169A ascends Agumbe ghat section of Western ghats of India (Bharat).

Currently, Malpe to Hebri stretch is being widened to 4-Lane National Highway.

== Route ==
Thirthahalli – Naalur – Agumbe – Someshwara – Hebri – Shivapura – Perdoor – Hiriyadka – Onthibettu – Athradi – Parkala – Manipal – Kunjibettu – Udupi City – Karavali Junction – Adi Udupi – Kodavoor – Malpe .

== Junctions ==
NH 169 Terminal near Thirthahalli.
NH 66 Terminal near Udupi.

== See also ==
- List of national highways in India
- List of national highways in India by state
- Ghat Roads
