= Javagal =

Javagal Javadakallu
- Village
- Location in Karnataka, India Javagal (India)
- Coordinates: 13°18′N 76°04′E
- Country: India
- State: Karnataka
- District: Hassan
- Region: Bayaluseeme
- Talukas: Arsikere

Government
  - Body: Grama Panchayath

Area
  - Total: 8.45 km^{2} (3.26 sq mi)
- Elevation: 811 m (2,661 ft)

Population (2011)
  - Total: 7,809
  - Density: 924/km^{2} (2,390/sq mi)

Languages
  - Official: Kannada
- Time zone: UTC+5:30 (IST)
- PIN: 573125
- Vehicle registration: KA-13

Javagal is a town, Hobli in the southern state of Karnataka, India. It is located in the Arsikere taluk of Hassan district in Karnataka. The Lakshminarasimha temple, built in 1250 A.D., is an important Hoysala architectural show piece in this town.

== Demographics ==
As of 2001 India census, Javagal had a population of 7504 with 3809 males and 3695 females.

== Connectivity ==
Javagal lies on NH-73. The nearest major railway station is Arsikere Junction railway station.

== Notable people ==
- Javagal Srinath (born 1969), former Indian cricketer, currently an ICC match referee

== See also ==
- Hassan
- Banavara
- Districts of Karnataka
