= Hethur, Hassan =

Hethur Hettur
- Village
- Hethur
- Location in Karnataka, India
- Coordinates: 12.7955648°N 75.7771244°E
- Country: India
- State: Karnataka
- District: Hassan
- Taluk: Sakleshpura

Government
  - Body: Grama Panchayath

Area
  - Total: 7.6 km^{2} (2.9 sq mi)
- Elevation: 980 m (3,220 ft)

Population (2011)
  - Total: 2,096
  - Density: 280/km^{2} (710/sq mi)

Languages
  - Official: Kannada
- Time zone: UTC+5:30 (IST)
- PIN: 573123
- Telephone code: +91-8173
- Vehicle registration: KA-46

Hethur or Hetthuru is a hobli in the Sakleshpura taluk in the Hassan district of Karnataka, India. As per a census survey of India conducted in 2011, the location code number of Hethur village is 615012.

It lies on State Highway 107, 25 km south of its taluk headquarter, Sakleshpura. Hethur is 58 km from Hassan and 235 km from the state capital Bengaluru.

The nearest railway stations are Sakleshpura and Hassan Junction. The nearest airport is Mangaluru International Airport.

== Nearby places of attraction ==
1. Patla betta
2. Kumara Parvatha
3. Mallalli waterfalls

== Rainfall ==
In 2022, Hettur hobli received an annual rainfall of 4,305 millimetres (169.5 in), the highest in Hassan district.
