= National Highway 766C (India) =

National highway in India

National Highway 766C
- Map of the National Highway in red

Route information
- Length: 198.5 km (123.3 mi)

Major junctions
- South end: Baindur
- North end: Ranebennuru

Location
- Country: India
- States: Karnataka

Highway system
- Roads in India; Expressways; National; State; Asian
← NH 66	→ NH 48

National Highway 766C, commonly referred to as NH 766C is a national highway in India. It is a spur road of National Highway 66. NH-766C traverses the state of Karnataka in India.

== Route ==
Byndoor(Baindur), Kollur, Hosanagara, Anandapur, Ananthapura, Shikaripura, Masur, Ranibennur.

== Junctions ==
NH 66 Terminal near Baindur.
NH 69 near Anandapur.
NH 48 Terminal near Ranibennur.

== See also ==
- List of national highways in India
- List of national highways in India by state
