= National Highway 716A (India) =

National Highway in India

National Highway 716A

Route information
- Auxiliary route of NH 16
- Length: 72.4 km (45.0 mi)

Major junctions
- West end: Puttur
- East end: Janappachataram

Location
- Country: India
- States: Andhra Pradesh, Tamil Nadu

Highway system
- Roads in India; Expressways; National; State; Asian
← NH 716	→ NH 16

National Highway 716A, commonly referred to as NH 716A is a national highway in India. It is a spur road of National Highway 16. NH-716A traverses the states of Andhra Pradesh and Tamil Nadu in India.

== Route ==
Andhra Pradesh

Puttur, Narayana Vanam, Thumburu, Koppedu, Harijan, Vada, Ramagiri, Krishnapuram, Vinobhanagar, Nagalapuram.

Tamil Nadu

Uthukkottai - Tamil Nadu border, A.P. border - Tharachi, Palavakkam, Thumbakkam, Periyapalam, Kannigaipair, Janappachataram.

== Junctions ==
NH 716 Terminal near Puttur.
NH 16 Terminal near Janappachataram.

== See also ==
- List of national highways in India
- List of national highways in India by state
