= National Highway 40 (India) =

National highway in India

National Highway 40
- Map of the National Highway in red

Route information
- Length: 411 km (255 mi)

Major junctions
- North end: NH 44 in Kurnool
- List: NH 340C in Kurnool; NH 340B in Chennamsetii Palle; NH 167K / NH 544D / NH 544F in Nandyal; NH 440 in Chagalamarri; NH 67 / NH 167B in Mydukur; NH 716 in Kadapa; NH 340 / NH 440 in Rayachoty; NH 71 in Pileru; NH 140 in Puthalapattu; NH 69 / NH 140 / NH 716B in Chittoor; NE 7 in Ramapuram
- South end: NH 48 in Ranipet

Location
- Country: India
- States: Andhra Pradesh: 381 km (237 mi) Tamil Nadu: 30 km (19 mi)
- Primary destinations: Nandyal - Cuddapah -Pileru -Chittoor

Highway system
- Roads in India; Expressways; National; State; Asian
← NH 44	→ NH 48

National Highway 40 (NH 40), a combination of previous national highways 4 and 18, is a national highway in India. It starts at National Highway 44 junction at Kurnool and passes through Kadapa and Chittoor and terminates at Ranipet in Tamil Nadu. It is called Rayalaseema Express Highway. The highway was transformed into four lanes between Kurnool and Kadapa & between Rayachoty-Ranipet.

== Route ==
It starts at Kurnool on NH44 and passes through Nandyal, Allagadda, Mydukur, Kadapa, Rayachoti, Pileru, Chittoor and ends on NH48 at Ranipet. The 411 kilometres (255 mi) highway runs for a distance of 381.00 km (236.74 mi) in Andhra Pradesh and 30.00 km (18.64 mi) in Tamil Nadu.

Kurnool ↔ Nandyal ↔ Allagadda ↔ Mydukur ↔ Kadapa ↔ Rayachoti ↔ Pileru ↔ Chittoor ↔ Ranipet

== See also ==
- List of national highways in India
- National Highways Development Project
