= Bilikere, Mysore =

Bilikere
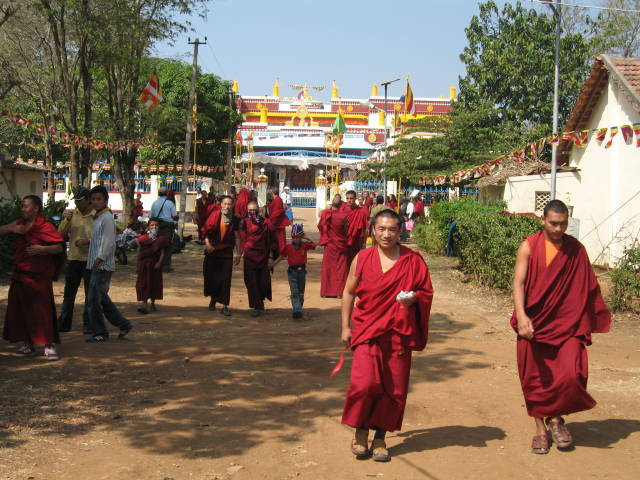
- Tibetan Monastery near Bilikere
- Interactive map of Bilikere
- Coordinates: 12.33582°N 76.45078°E
- Country: India
- State: Karnataka
- District: Mysore
- Taluk: Hunsur

Area
  - Total: 3.6 km^{2} (1.4 sq mi)
- Elevation: 812 m (2,664 ft)

Population
  - Total: 5,491
- Time zone: UTC+5:30 (IST)
- PIN: 571103

Bilikere is a small town in Hunsur taluk of Mysore district in the Indian state of Karnataka.

== Location ==
Bilikere lies 25 kilometres (16 mi) west of Mysore city. It is 21 kilometres (13 mi) from Hunsur and 167 kilometres (104 mi) from Bangalore. Nearby villages include:

- Yalachavadi - 2 km
- Manuganahalli - 4 km
- Bolanahalli - 5 km
- Gagenahalli - 6 km
- Devarahalli - 4 km
- Doddamaragowdanahalli - 8 km
- Nagawala - 9 km
- Husenapura-6 km

== Etymology ==
Bilikere got its name from a 100-acre water tank that had a white colour.

== Education ==
The nearest college is the Government Degree college, PU college,

== Image gallery ==
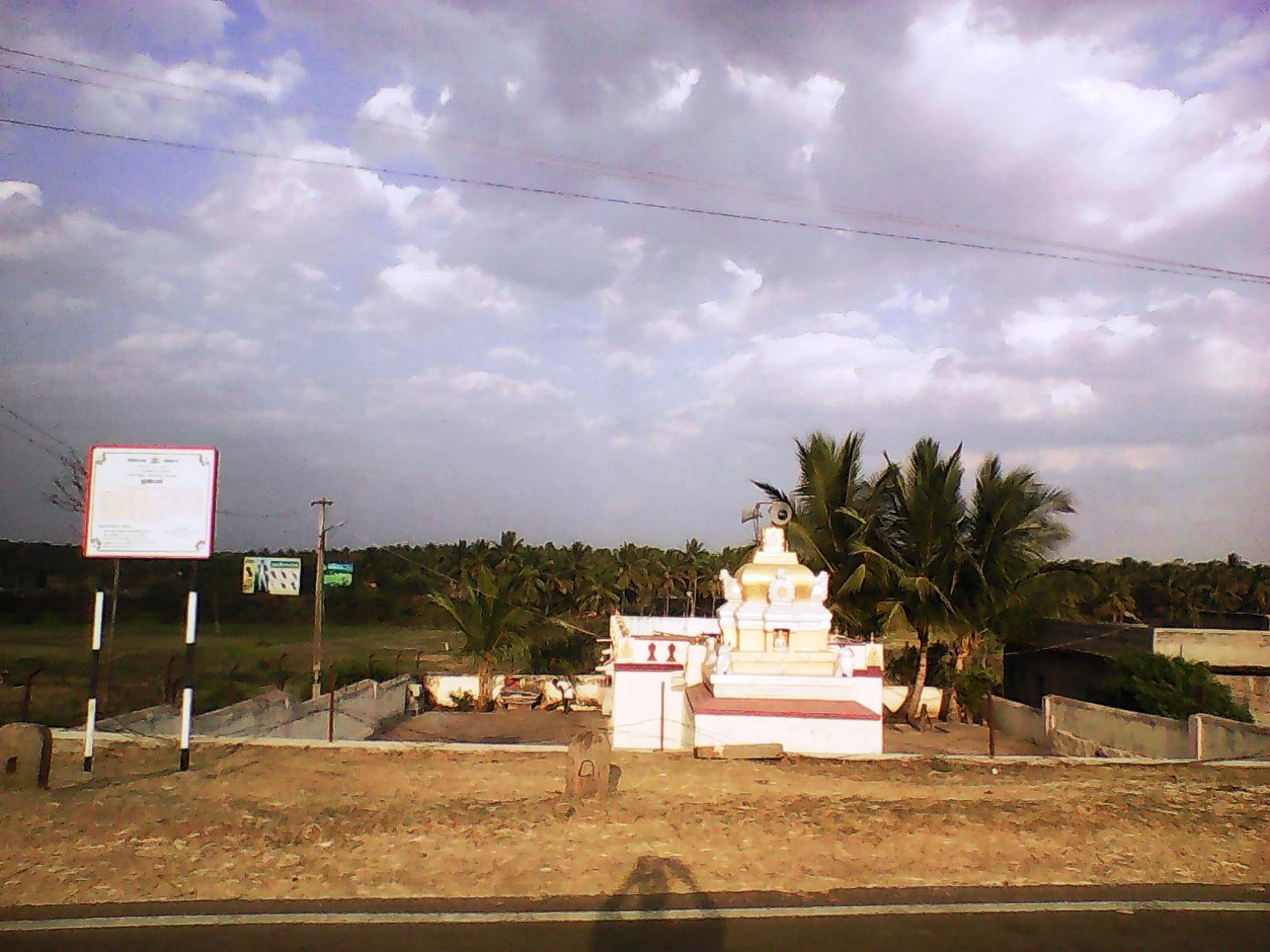
Bilikere Lake

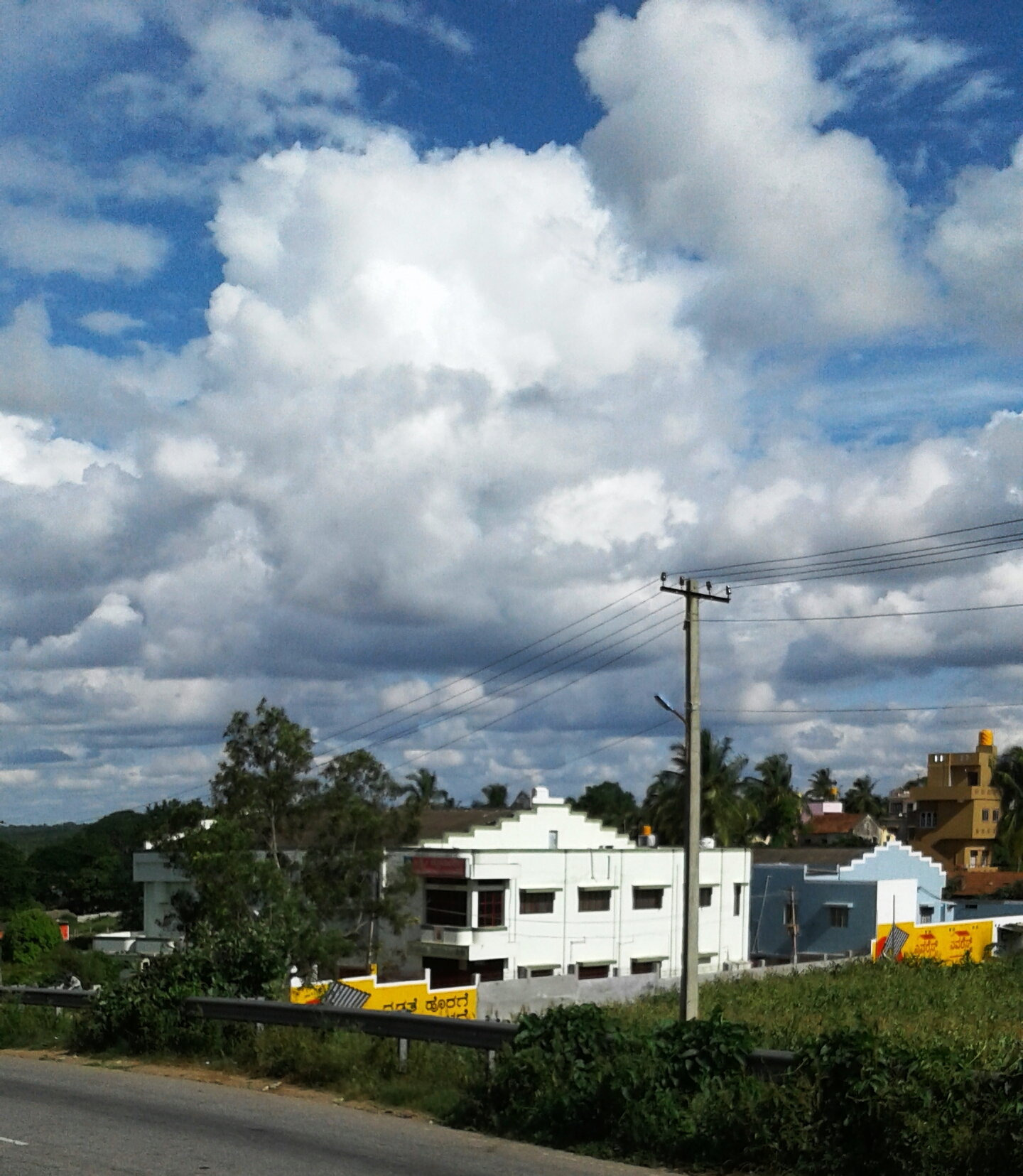
Bilikere
