= National Highway 716 (India) =

National highway in India

National Highway 716
- Map of the National Highway in red

Route information
- Length: 264 km (164 mi)

Major junctions
- South end: Chennai, Tamil Nadu
- North end: Muddanur, Andhra Pradesh

Location
- Country: India
- States: Tamil Nadu: 78 km Andhra Pradesh: 186 km
- Primary destinations: Tiruttani, Tirupati, Rajampet, Kadapa, Yerraguntla

Highway system
- Roads in India; Expressways; National; State; Asian
← NH 16	→ NH 67

National Highway 716 (NH 716) is a National Highway in India. It starts from its junction with NH 16 near Chennai in Tamil Nadu and terminates at its junction with NH 67 near Muddanur in Andhra Pradesh.

== Route ==
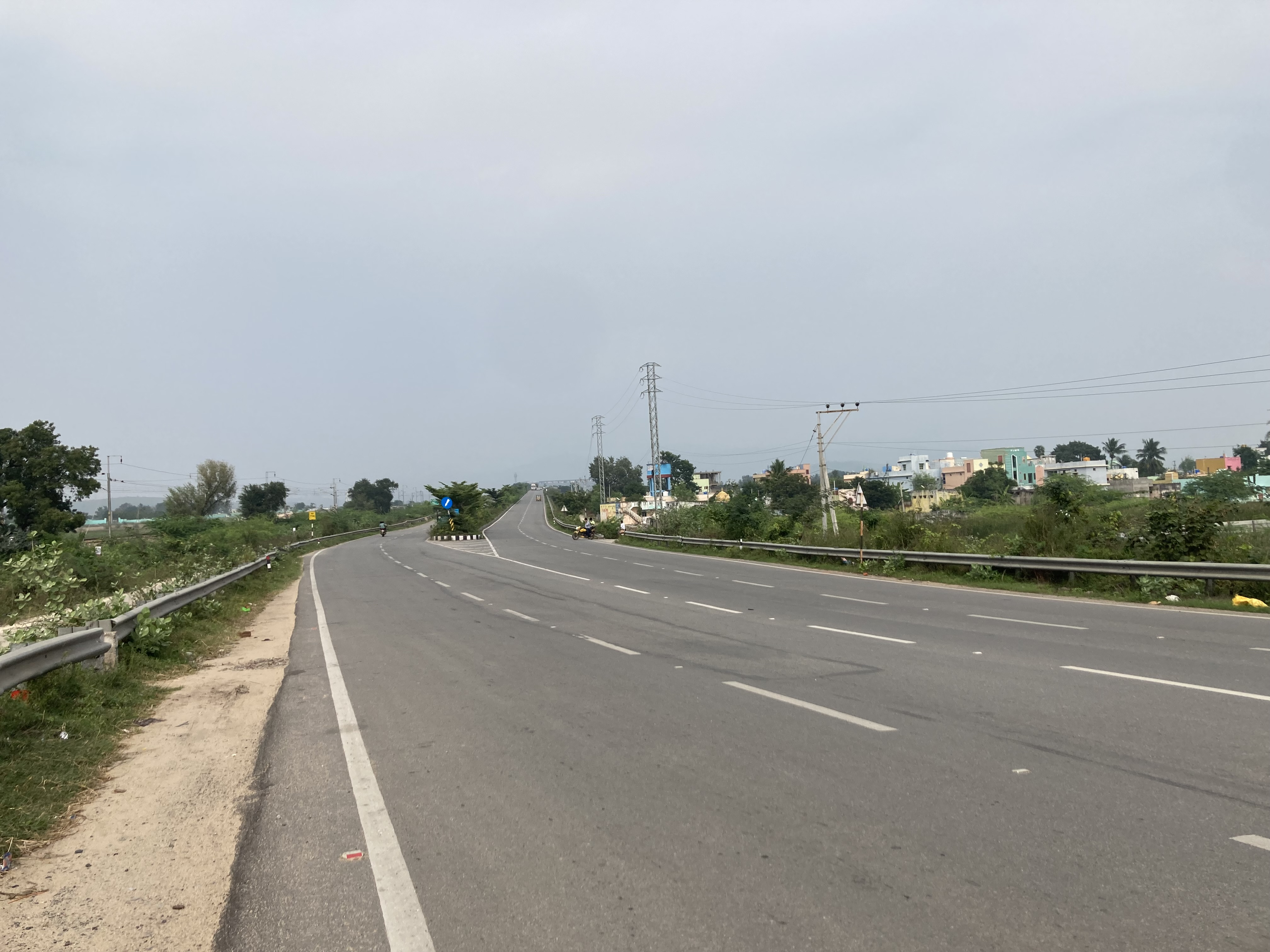
NH 716 Near Renigunta

It starts at Chennai in Tamil Nadu and terminates at Muddanur in Andhra Pradesh. It has a total route length of 319.3 km (198.4 mi).

Tamil Nadu

Chennai, Tiruvallur, Tiruttani - A. P. border.

Andhra Pradesh

T. N. border - Puttur, Tirupati, Mamanduru, Settigunta, Koduru, Pullampeta, Rajampet, Nandalur, Madhavaram, Vonimitta, Bhakarapet, Kadapa (Cuddapah), Yerraguntla, Muddanur

== Junctions ==
NH 16 Terminal near Chennai.
NH 716A near Puttur.
NH 71 near Tirupati.
NH 40 near Kadapa.
NH 67 Terminal near Muddanur.

== See also ==
- List of national highways in India
- List of national highways in Andhra Pradesh
