= Sakleshpur =

Hill station town in Karnataka, India

Sakleshpur Sakaleshapura
- Town
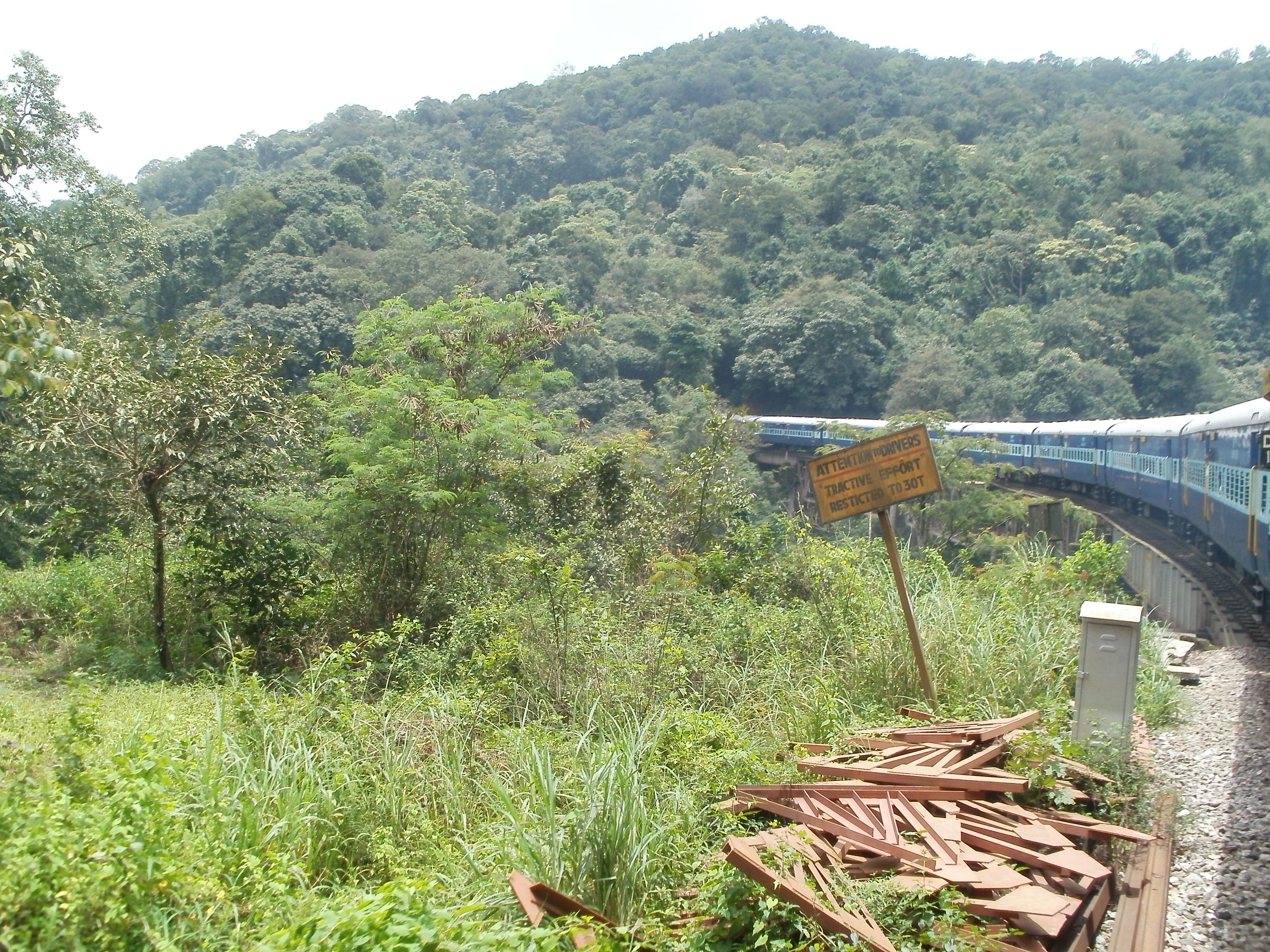

- Location in Karnataka, India
- Coordinates: 12.893°N 75.725°E
- Country: India
- State: Karnataka
- District: Hassan
- Region: Malenadu
- Named for: Sakaleshwara swamy

Government
  - Body: Town Municipal Council
  - AC: Ms. Shruthi

Area
  - Town: 4.70 km^{2} (1.81 sq mi)
  - Rural: 1,023.12 km^{2} (395.03 sq mi)
- Elevation: 932 m (3,058 ft)

Population (2011)
  - Town: 23,352
  - Density: 4,970/km^{2} (12,900/sq mi)
  - Rural: 105,281

Languages
  - Official: Kannada
- Time zone: UTC+5:30 (IST)
- PIN: 573134
- Telephone code: +91–8173
- Vehicle registration: KA-46
- Sex ratio: 100:80 ♂/♀
- Website: http://www.sakaleshpuratown.mrc.gov.in

Sakleshpur or Sakaleshapura, is a town and the taluk in Hassan district in the state of Karnataka, India. The town is located on the banks of Hemavati River and it lies in the foot-hills of the Western Ghats range. The distance from Hassan city to Sakleshpur is approximately 39 km.

== Geography ==
Sakleshpur is located at 12.893°N 75.725°E. It has an average elevation of 932 m (3,058 ft) above mean sea level.

The Western Ghats mountains extend along the western edge of the taluk, separating Sakleshpur from Dakshina Kannada district. The Hemavati River, a tributary of the Kaveri, drains the eastern portion of the town, originating in Mudigere taluk of Chikkamagaluru district and flowing through Sakleshpur town.

The Netravati River flows westward, which empties into the Arabian Sea at Mangalore. The Kumaradhara River, a tributary of the river Netravathi, drains the southwestern portion of the taluk.

Jenkal or Jenukallu Betta which is 1,380 metres (4,530 ft) above sea level (12.955377°N 75.617224°E), the highest peak in Hassan district, is located in Sakleshpura Taluk. It is around 38 kilometres from Sakleshpura town.

=== Climate ===
Climate data for Sakleshpur
Month	Jan	Feb	Mar	Apr	May	Jun	Jul	Aug	Sep	Oct	Nov	Dec	Year
Mean daily maximum °C (°F)	27.5 (81.5)	29.7 (85.5)	31.7 (89.1)	31.6 (88.9)	30.0 (86.0)	25.5 (77.9)	23.6 (74.5)	24.1 (75.4)	25.3 (77.5)	26.6 (79.9)	26.4 (79.5)	26.3 (79.3)	27.4 (81.2)
Mean daily minimum °C (°F)	15.2 (59.4)	16.4 (61.5)	18.3 (64.9)	19.9 (67.8)	20.2 (68.4)	19.2 (66.6)	18.8 (65.8)	18.8 (65.8)	18.4 (65.1)	18.6 (65.5)	17.1 (62.8)	15.4 (59.7)	18.0 (64.4)
Average rainfall mm (inches)	1 (0.0)	2 (0.1)	6 (0.2)	73 (2.9)	117 (4.6)	320 (12.6)	835 (32.9)	431 (17.0)	144 (5.7)	187 (7.4)	56 (2.2)	6 (0.2)	2,178 (85.8)
Source: Climate-data.org, Highest Rainfall: Hethur Hobli - 4,305 millimetres (169.5 in) (Year 2022)

Sakleshpur has a Tropical savanna climate (AW), according to the Koppen-Geiger classification. In 2022 Hethur hobli in Sakleshpura taluk received the maximum downpour of 4,305 millimetres (169.5 in). As per the records, the highest rainfall of 33.96 inches (862.5 mm) in June alone was recorded in 1896.

== Demographics ==
As of 2011 India census, Sakleshpur had a population of 23,352 of which 11,558 are males while 11,794 are females. Sakleshpur has an average literacy rate of 88.47%: male literacy is 92.72%, and female literacy is 84.31%. In Sakleshpur, 11% of the population is under 6 years of age.

== Economy ==
Sakleshpur taluk economy relies heavily on commercial plantation, agriculture, eco tourism and spice trade. The region produces Coffee, Black pepper, Cardamom, Cinnamon, and Areca-nut provides year around revenue.

== Tourist locations ==
=== Manjarabad Fort ===
The Manjarabad Fort was built by Tippu Sultan in 1792. Its located on the outskirts of Sakleshpur on NH 75. It has a 8-pointed star-shaped fort on a hillock overlooking the road to Mangalore. There is a hollow entrance in the center, which is said to be the entrance of a tunnel leading to Srirangapattana. There is a mural with the fort's map at the entrance which is in excellent condition. The fort is maintained by the Department of Archeology.

=== Waterfalls ===
Major waterfalls includes the Magajahalli, Hadlu, and Abbimane waterfalls. The Mookana-mane waterfalls is situated 20 km from the Sakleshpur.

=== Trekking Trails ===
The main trekking trails include Bisle View Point, Ombattu Gudda, Jenukal Gudda and Agni Gudda.

The Bisle view point is located 35 km from sakleshpur. Its part of the Bisle Reserve Forest. The point offers a view of Dodda Betta, Patla Betta, Pushpagiri, and Kumara Parvata.

=== Hills ===
Major hills include the Jenukallu betta and Agnigudda. Jenukal hill is the second highest peak in Karnataka. It is also called Honey hill and is situated 40 km from Sakleshpur. Agnigudda, the meaning signifies Volcanic hill and is located 35 km from sakleshpur.

=== Temples ===
Main temples include Sri Sakaleshwara Swamy Temple, Hole Malleshwara Temple, the temples are located at the banks of the river Hemavati.

== Gallery ==
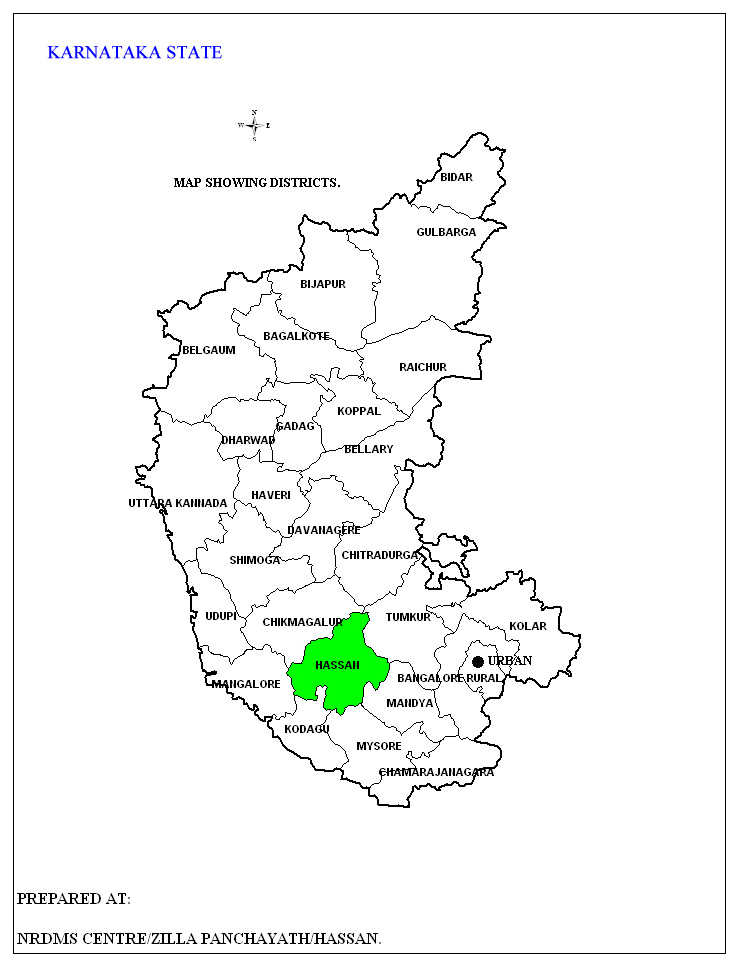
Positioning of Hassan district in Karnataka

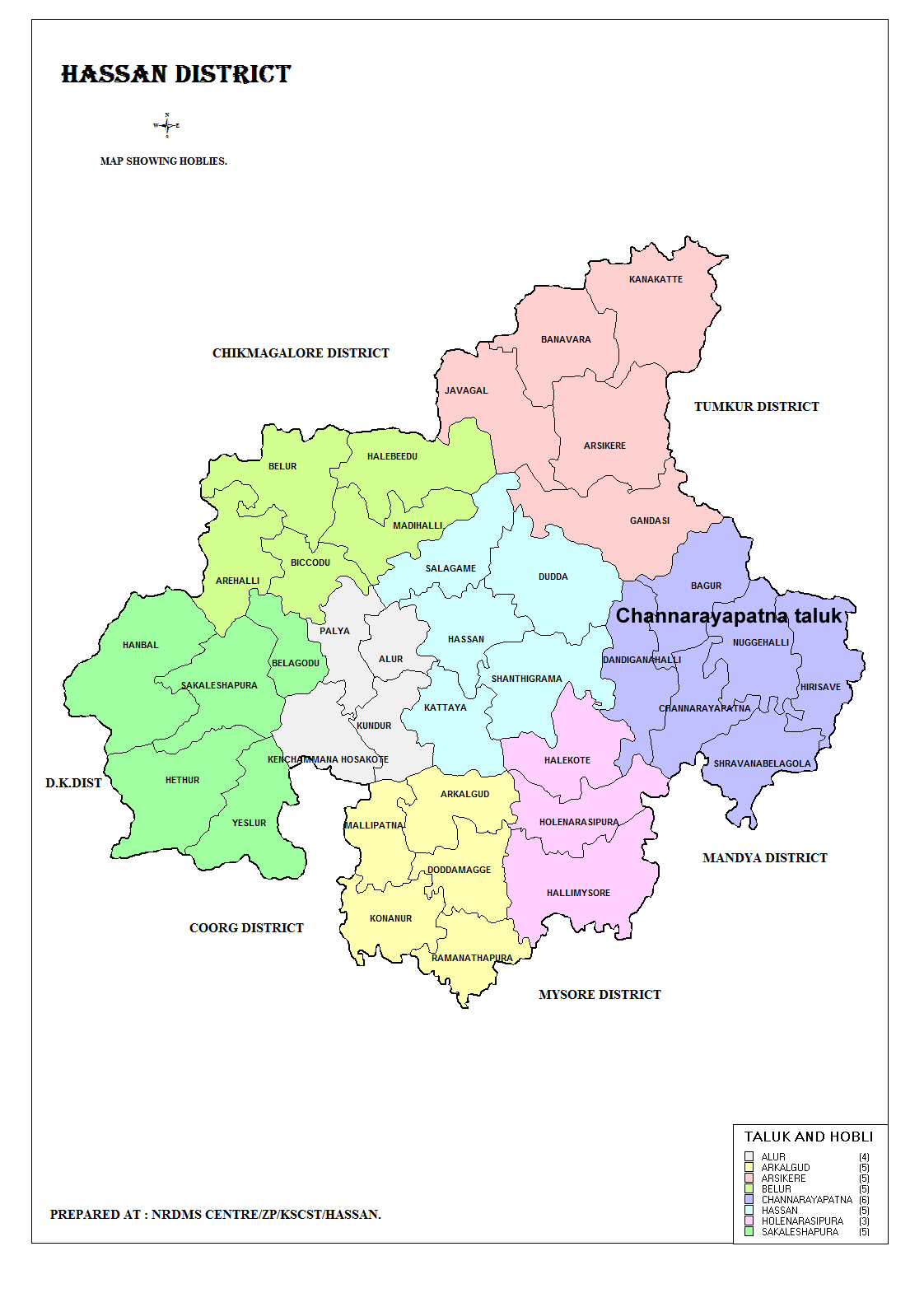
Hobli Map of Hassan district

Map of Sakleshpur Taluk as per 2001 Census

Map of Sakleshpur Taluk as per 2011 Census

Sakleshpur Taluk - Hobli and Village Map

Sakleshpur Taluk - Grama Panchayat and Village Map

Sakleshpur Taluk Map about Fluoride content in DWS

== See also ==
- Hanbalu, Hassan
- Hassan
- Mangalore
- Shiradi Ghat
- Puttur
- Madikeri
- Somvarpet
