= National Highway 544E (India) =

Highway in Andhra Pradesh and Karnataka

National Highway 544E
- Map of National Highway 544E in red

Route information
- Auxiliary route of NH 44
- Length: 119.5 km (74.3 mi)

Major junctions
- East end: Kodikonda
- West end: Sira

Location
- Country: India
- States: Andhra Pradesh, Karnataka

Highway system
- Roads in India; Expressways; National; State; Asian
← NH 44	→ NH 48

National Highway 544E is a national highway in India. NH 544E is a secondary route of National Highway 44. NH-544E traverses the states of Andhra Pradesh and Karnataka in India.

== Route ==
Kondikonda checkpost, Lepakshi, Hindupur, [[ ]], Rolla, Agali, Sira.

== Junctions ==
NH 44 Terminal near Kondikonda.
NH 48 Terminal near Sira.

== Construction ==
Rehabilitation and up-gradation of 59.1 km of new NH-544E from Kodikonda Junction to Madakasira section to two lane with paved shoulder on EPC mode is being taken up.

== See also ==
- List of national highways in India
- List of national highways in India by state
