= National Highway 173 (India) =

National highway in India

National Highway 173

Route information
- Length: 196 km (122 mi)

Major junctions
- South end: Mudigere on NH-73, Karnataka
- North end: Anagodu near Davanagere on NH-48, Karnataka

Location
- Country: India
- States: Karnataka
- Districts: Chikkamagaluru, Chitradurga and Davanagere
- Primary destinations: Mudigere, Chikkamagaluru, Kadur, Hosadurga, Holalkere, Chikkajajur, Mayakonda

Highway system
- Roads in India; Expressways; National; State; Asian

National Highway 173 (NH 173), is a national highway in Indian state of Karnataka. It originates in Mudigere, travels through Vastare and Sakharayapatna of Chikmagalur district, Hosadurga, Holalkere, Chikkajajur of Chitradurga district, it terminates at Anagodu on Bengaluru - Pune Highway in Davanagere District. Road widening project has been kept in abeyance after just renumbering existing state highway to national highway by NHAI.

== See also ==
- List of national highways in India
- National Highways Development Project
- List of national highways in Karnataka
