= National Highway 73 (India) =

National Highway in India

National Highway 73
- Map of the National Highway in red
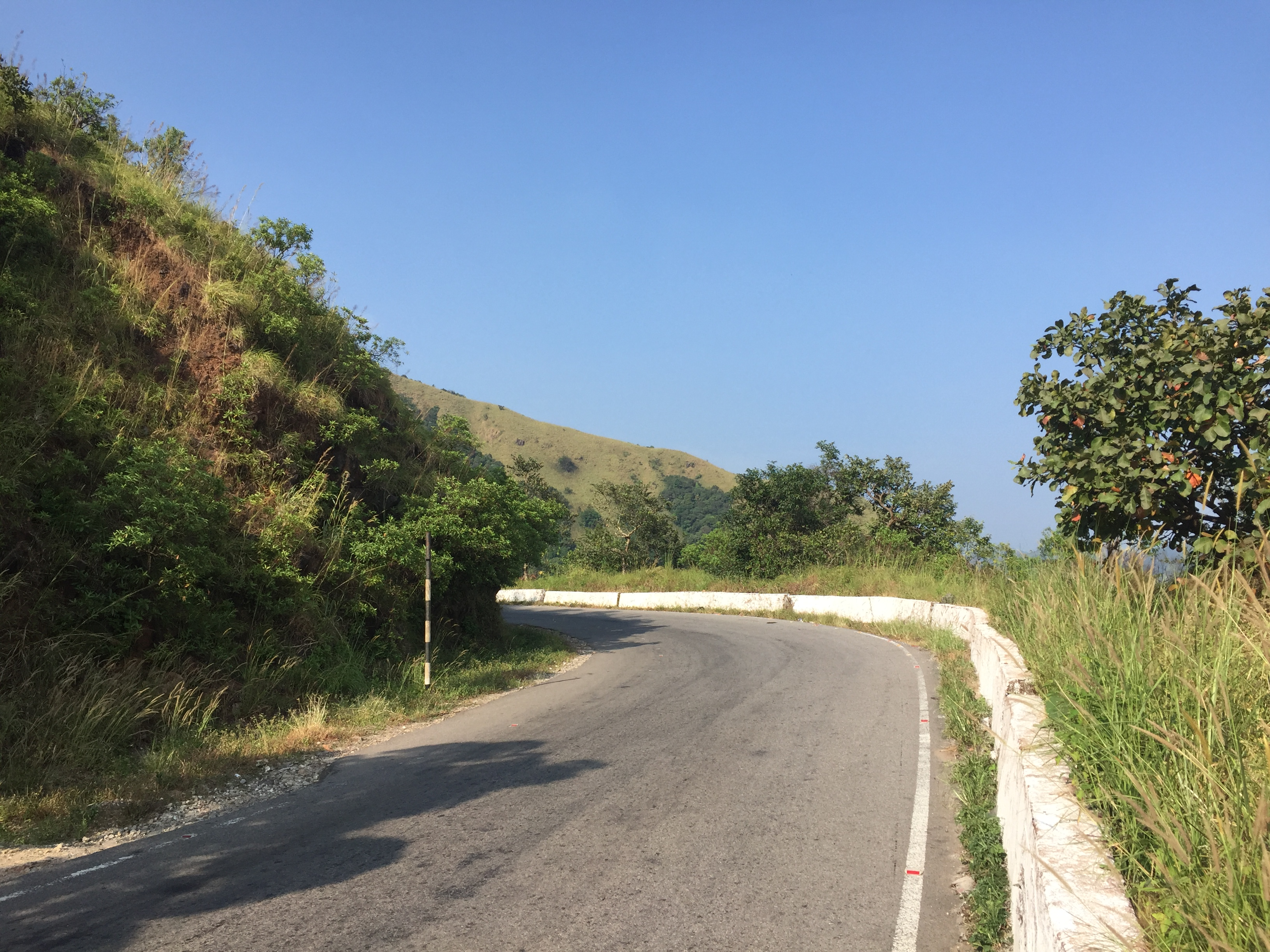
- NH 73 crossing Charmadi Ghat

Route information
- Length: 317 km (197 mi)

Major junctions
- West end: Mangaluru
- East end: Ramanagara

Location
- Country: India
- States: Karnataka

Highway system
- Roads in India; Expressways; National; State; Asian
← NH 72	→ NH 74

National Highway 73 (NH 73) is a National Highway in India. This highway runs in the Indian state of Karnataka. It starts from sea port city of Mangaluru ( Mangalore) and ends at Ramanagara. Even though named as national highway the road is narrow and prone to landslips and falling of trees in Charmady ghat section of Western Ghats. This highway was previously part of national highways 48, 234 and 206 but subsequent to rationalisation of national highway numbers of India by Gazette notification on 5 March 2010 it was changed to National Highway 73.

== Route ==
Schematic map of National Highways in India

The national highway 73 ( NH-73) connects towns of Mangaluru, Bantwal Beltangady, Ujire, Charmadi, Kottigehara, Mudigere, Belur, Halebeedu, Javagal, Banavara, Arasikere, Tiptur, Kibbanahalli, Nittur, Gubbi and Tumakuru in the state of Karnataka.

== Junctions ==
NH 66 Terminal near Mangaluru.
NH 75 near Bantval
NH 173 near Mudigere
NH 373 near Belur
NH 69 near Banavara
NH 150A near Kibbanahalli
NH 48 Terminal near Tumakuru.

== See also ==
- List of national highways in India
- List of national highways in India by state
- National Highways Development Project
- Ghat Roads
