= Venkatagirikota =

Venkatagirikota Venkatagirikota
- Mandal
- Interactive map of Venkatagirikota
- Location in Andhra Pradesh, India
- Coordinates: 13.0012°N 78.4795°E
- Country: India
- State: Andhra Pradesh
- District: Chittoor
- Mandal: Venkatagirikota
- Elevation: 764 m (2,507 ft)

Population (2011)
  - Total: 12,803

Languages
  - Official: Telugu
- Time zone: UTC+5:30 (IST)
- PIN: 517424
- Vehicle registration: AP-39

Venkatagirikota (also known as V. Kota) is a village in Chittoor district of the Indian state of Andhra Pradesh. It is the mandal headquarters of Venkatagirikota mandal.

== Geography ==
Venkatagirikota is located at 13.0000°N 78.5000°E. It has an average elevation of 764 meters (2509 feet) above sea level. The town lies at the boarder of Karnataka and Tamil Nadu and is connected by three highways. Its population includes people from several religious communities.
