= Gorur, Hassan =

Gorur
- Village
- Goruru
- Location in Karnataka, India
- Coordinates: 12.822187°N 76.063113°E
- Country: India
- State: Karnataka
- District: Hassan
- Taluk: Hassan

Government
  - Body: Grama Panchayath

Area
  - Total: 3.87 km^{2} (1.49 sq mi)
- Elevation: 895 m (2,936 ft)

Population (2011)
  - Total: 3,749
  - Density: 969/km^{2} (2,510/sq mi)

Languages
  - Official: Kannada
- Time zone: UTC+5:30 (IST)
- PIN: 573120
- Vehicle registration: KA-13

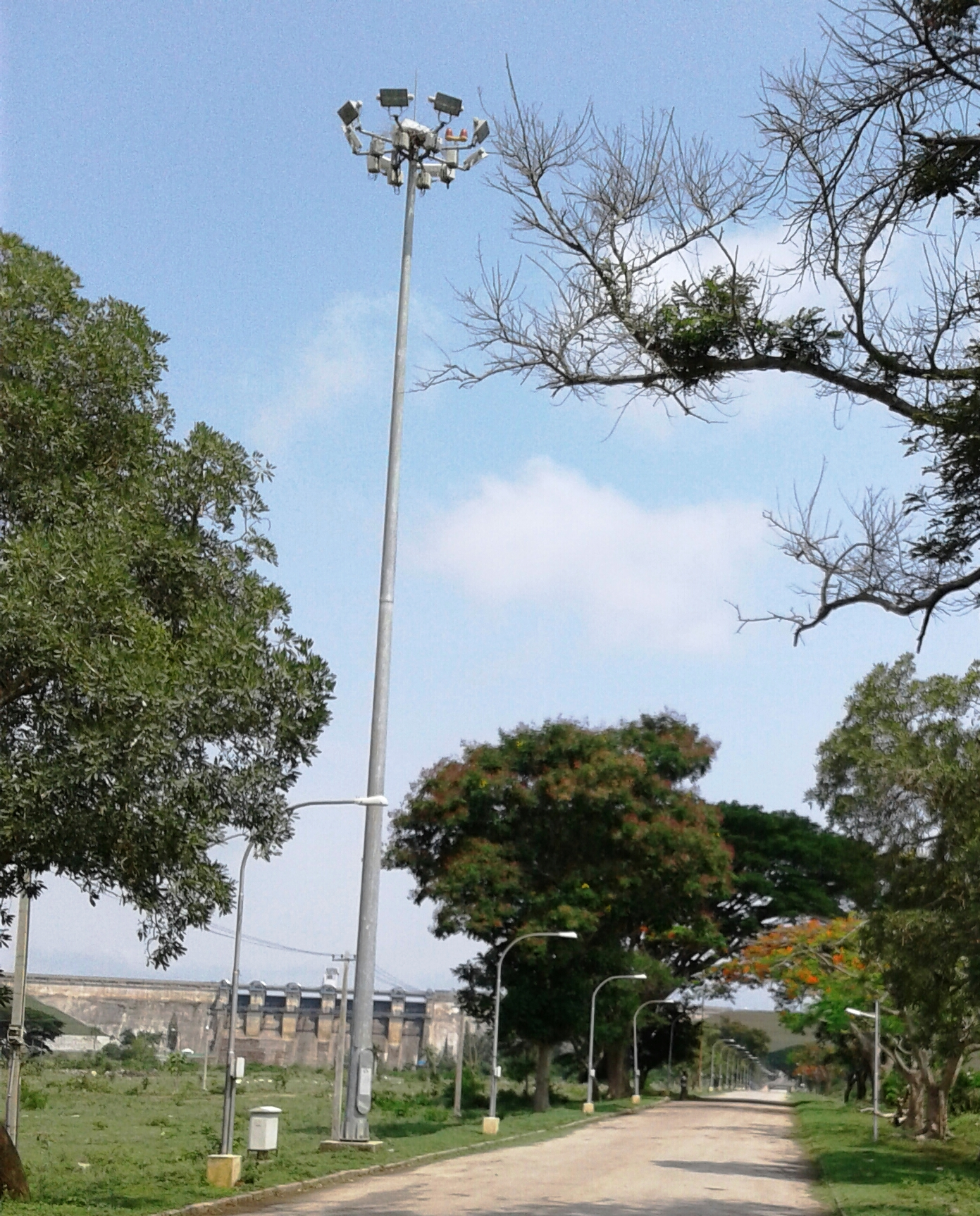
Gorur Dam Entrance

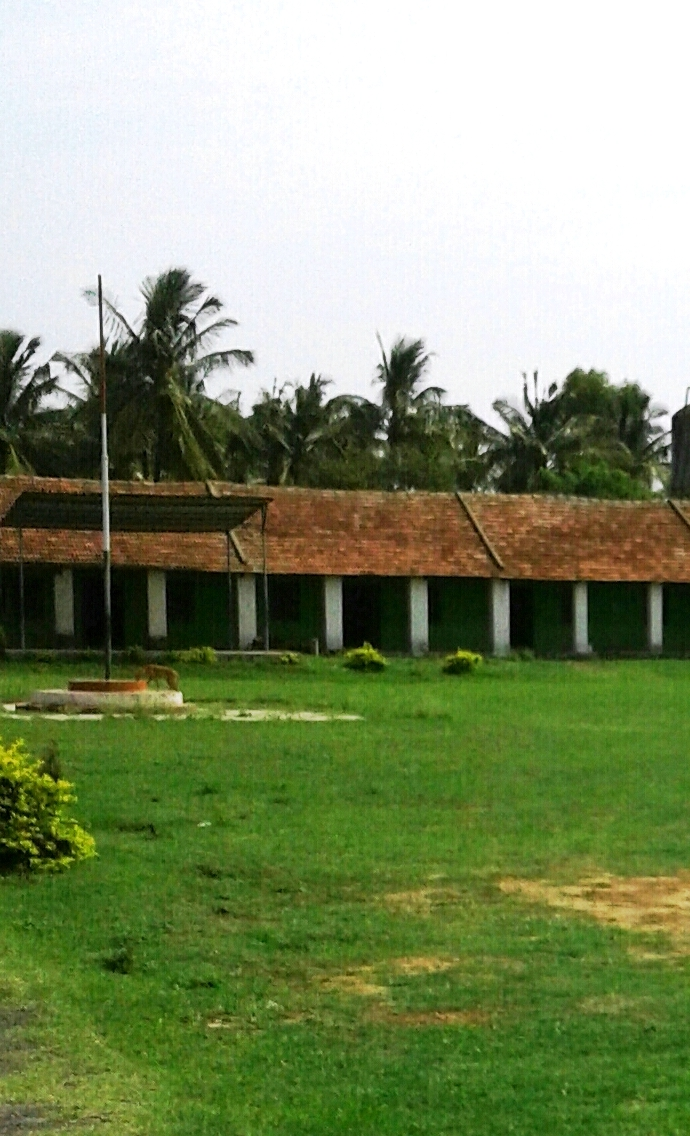
Gorur school

Gorur or Goruru is a village in Hassan district of Karnataka state in India, it is located in Hassan taluk.

== Location ==
Gorur is located in Hassan Taluk of Hassan district. The Hassan-Piriyapatna Highway passes through it.

== Tourism ==
Gorur dam gardens and the Gorur temple attracts many visitors. A dam across the Hemavati river was completed in 1979, above Gorur in Hassan district, and downstream from the Yagachi confluence. The dam is 58 meters in height, and 4692 meters long, impounding a reservoir of 8502 hectares The Hemavati River starts in the Western Ghats at an elevation of about 1,219 metres near Ballala rayana durga in the Chikmagalur District of the state of Karnataka, in southern India. It flows through Hassan District where it is joined by its chief tributary, the Yagachi River, and then into Mandya district before joining the Kaveri near Krishnarajasagara. It is approximately 245 km long and has a drainage area of about 5,410 km^{2}.

== Notable people ==
Goruru Ramaswamy Iyengar (1904–1991), popularly known as Goruru, was a Kannada writer and well known for his humour and satire. Goruru Ramaswami Iyengar was born at "Goruru" in Hassan district of Karnataka in 1904.His father Srinivas Iyengar and mother Lakshamma Goruru Ramaswami Iyengar was influenced by Indian Independence Movement and became a staunch follower of Mahatma Gandhi. He was jailed by the British administration in 1942 for 2 months for his participation in the Quit India Movement and in 1947. His son Ramachandra became a martyr for the same cause in 1947. After Independence in 1947, Goruru worked in the Khadi Board Industries. He began writing early in life with the celebrated books HALLIYA CHITRAGALU (1930) and NAMMA OORINA RASIKARU (1932). His "Amerikadalli Goruru" 1979, is a satirical travelogue of a true Indian in United States. It fetched him the Sahitya Akademi Award in 1981. His short story "Bhootayyana Maga Ayyu" (based on true events) was made into a Kannada movie of the same name by noted director S. Siddalingaiah in 1975. Novels Hemavathi and URVASHI were also made into movies. His travelogue was made into a television series. His other works include Rasaphala, Namma Oorina Rasikaru, Putta mallige, Hemavathi and Garudagambada Dasayya, MERAVANIGE. He was nominated to Karnataka Legislative Council in 1952 in recognition of his literary contributions. In 1971 he was a recipient of an Honorary doctorate from the University of Mysore. A road in Rajajinagar, Bangalore is named after him. Goruru Ramaswamy Iyengar died in 1991 at the age of 87. His birth centenary was celebrated in 2005. His memoirs of his childhood days, Goruru Avara Balyada Atma Kathe was published posthumously.

G.R.Gopinath: G. R. Gopinath is the founder of Air Deccan

== See also ==
- Gurur, Mysore.

== Image gallery ==
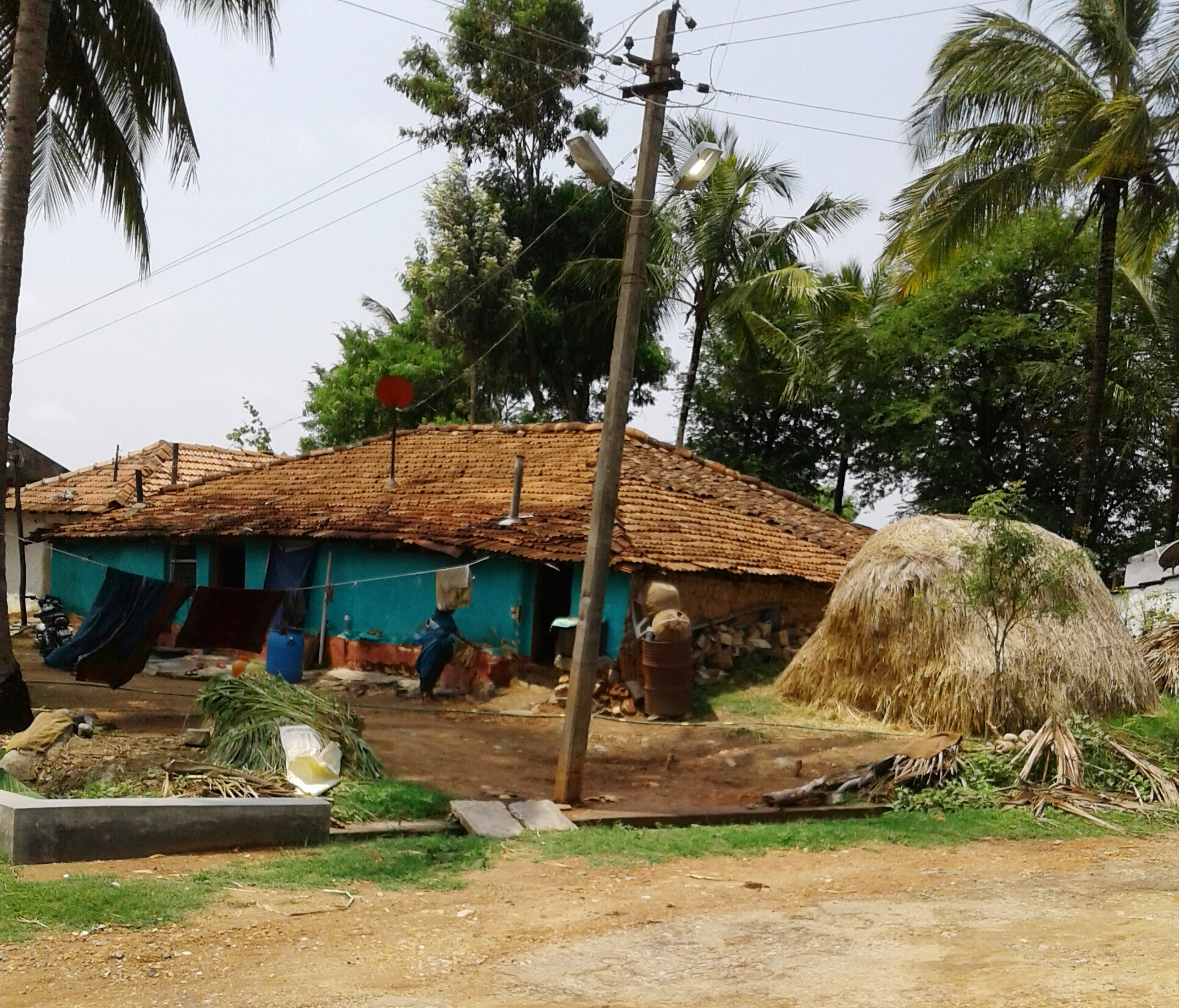
Honnagowdanahalli

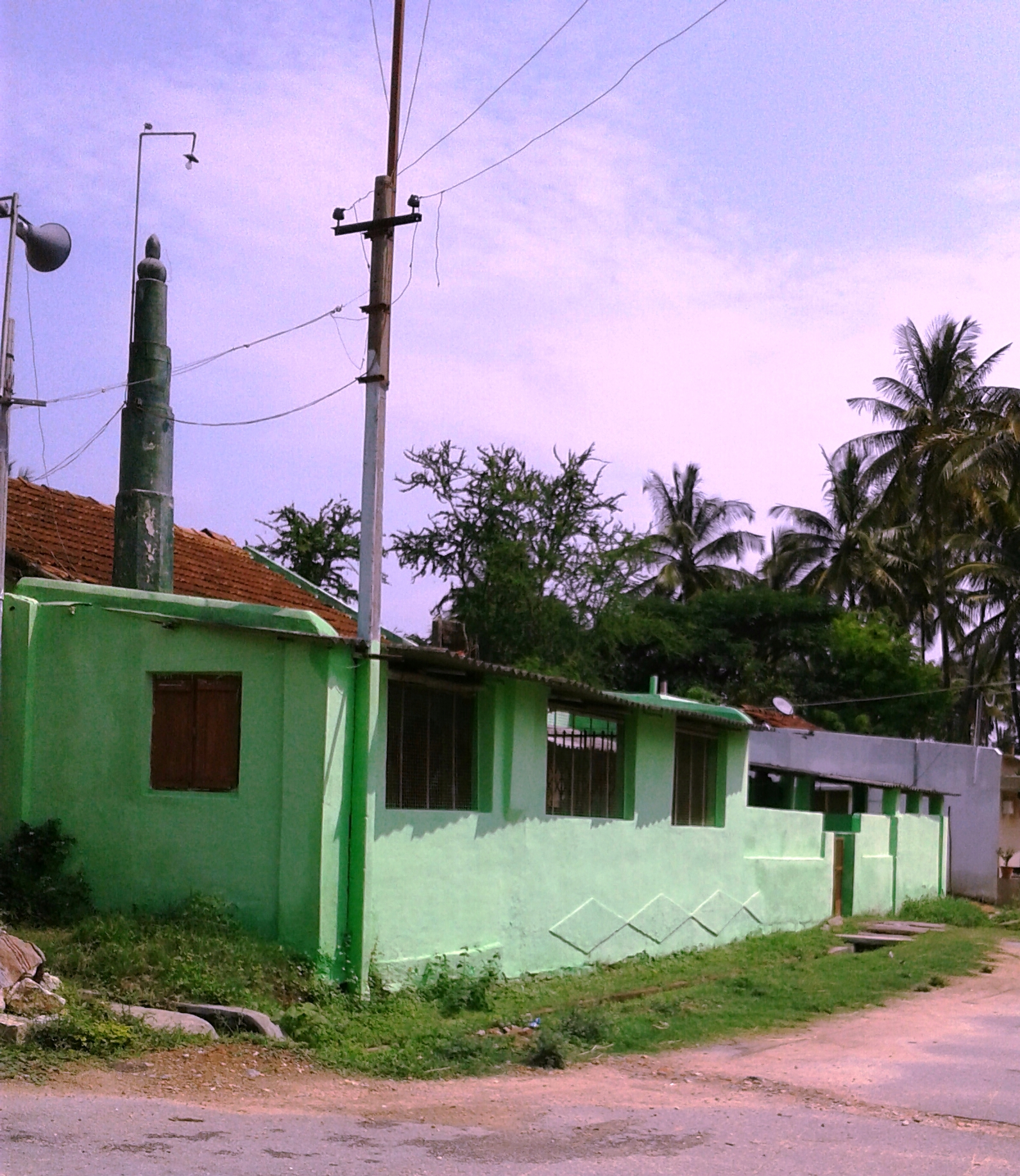
Gorur Mosque

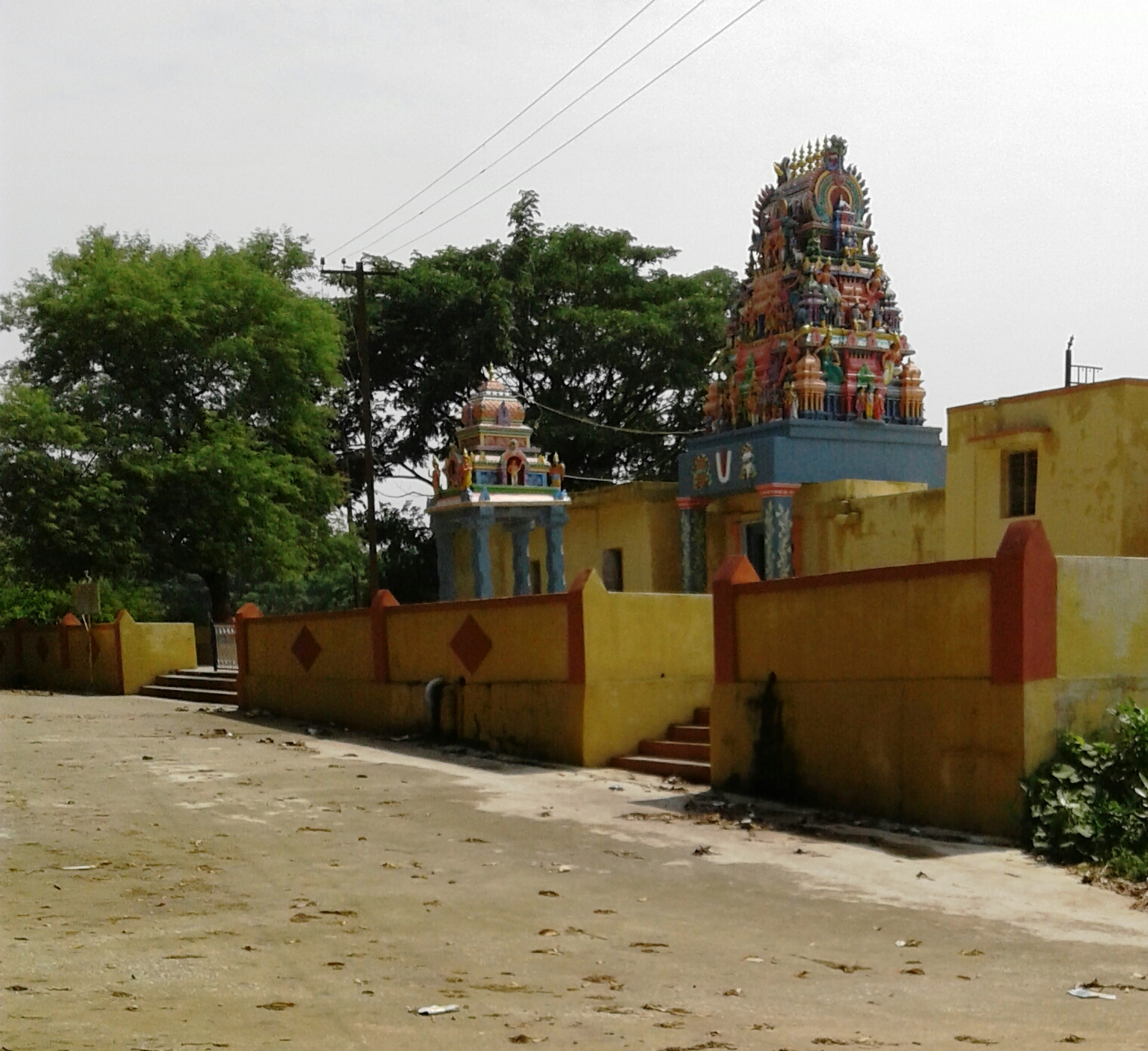
Narasimha Temple

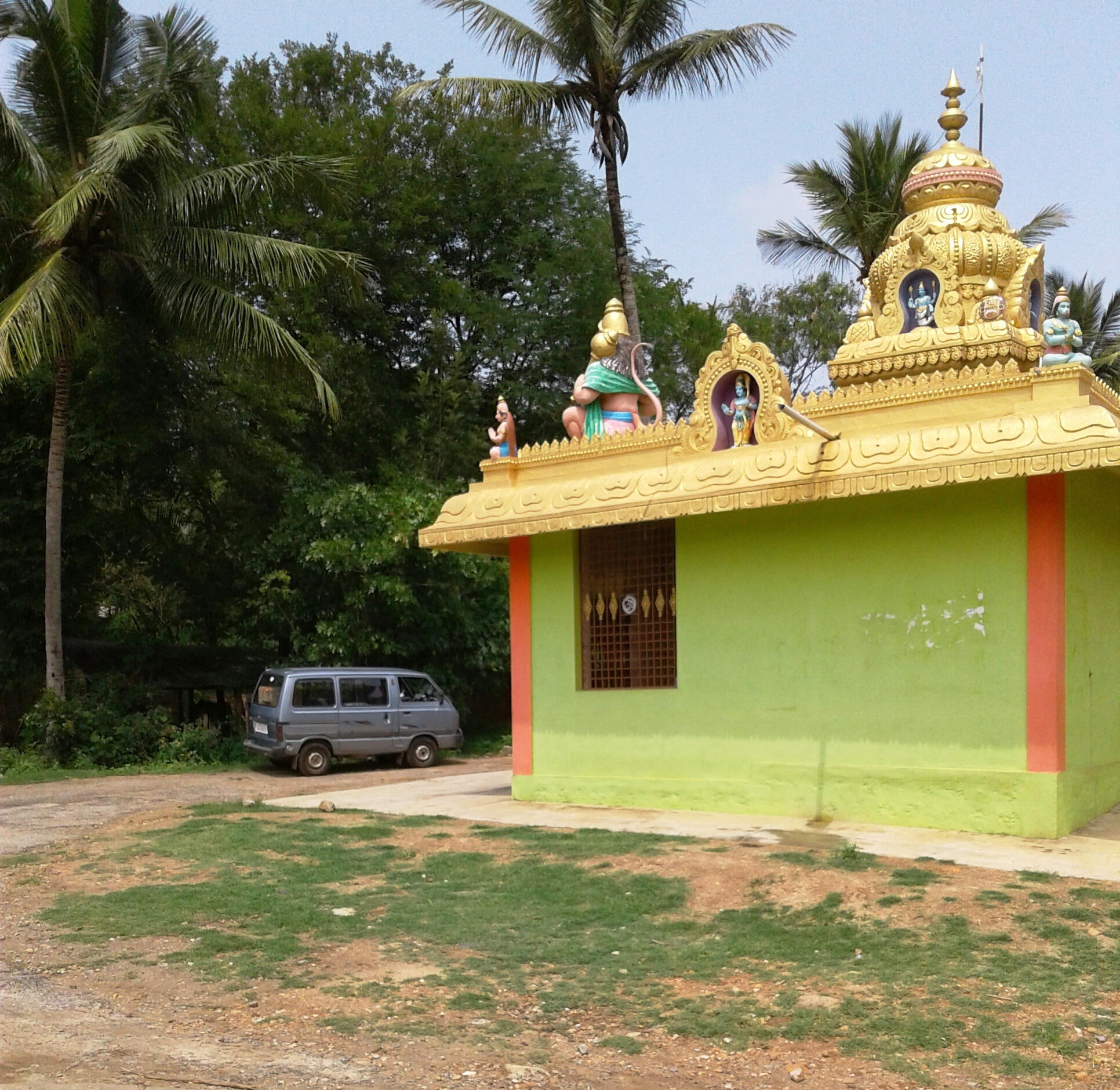
Athini

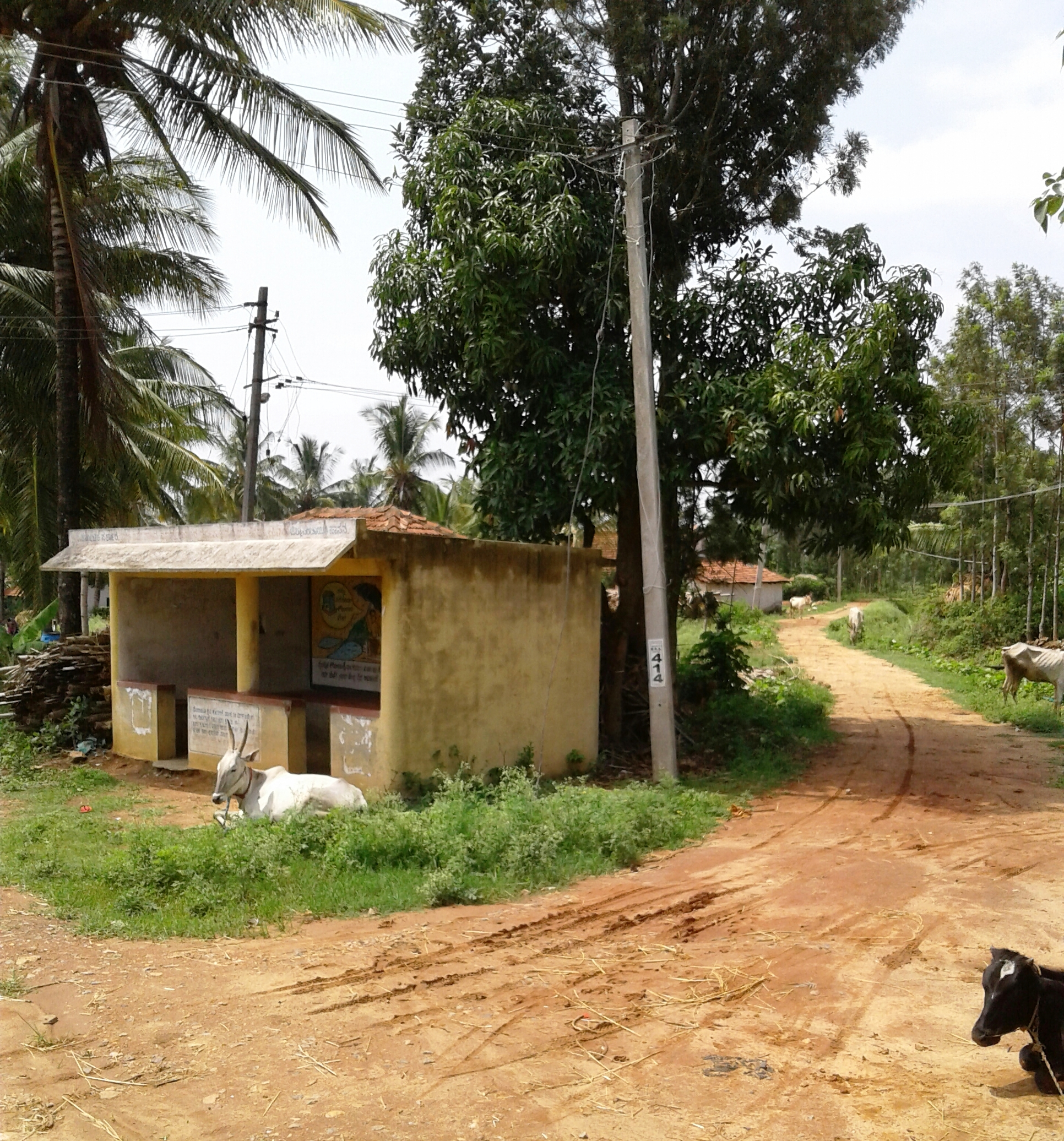
Bolakyathanahalli

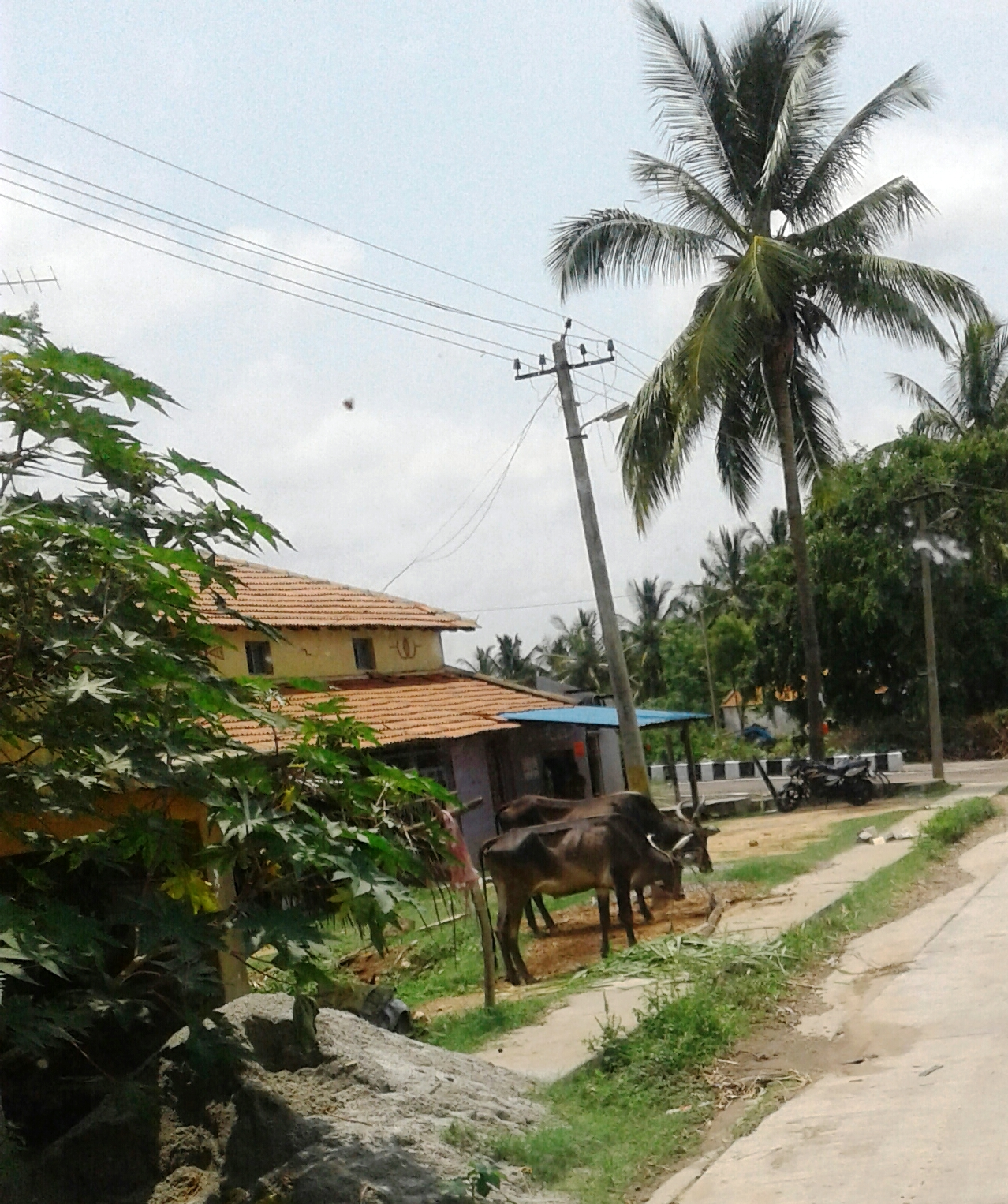
HNP Road

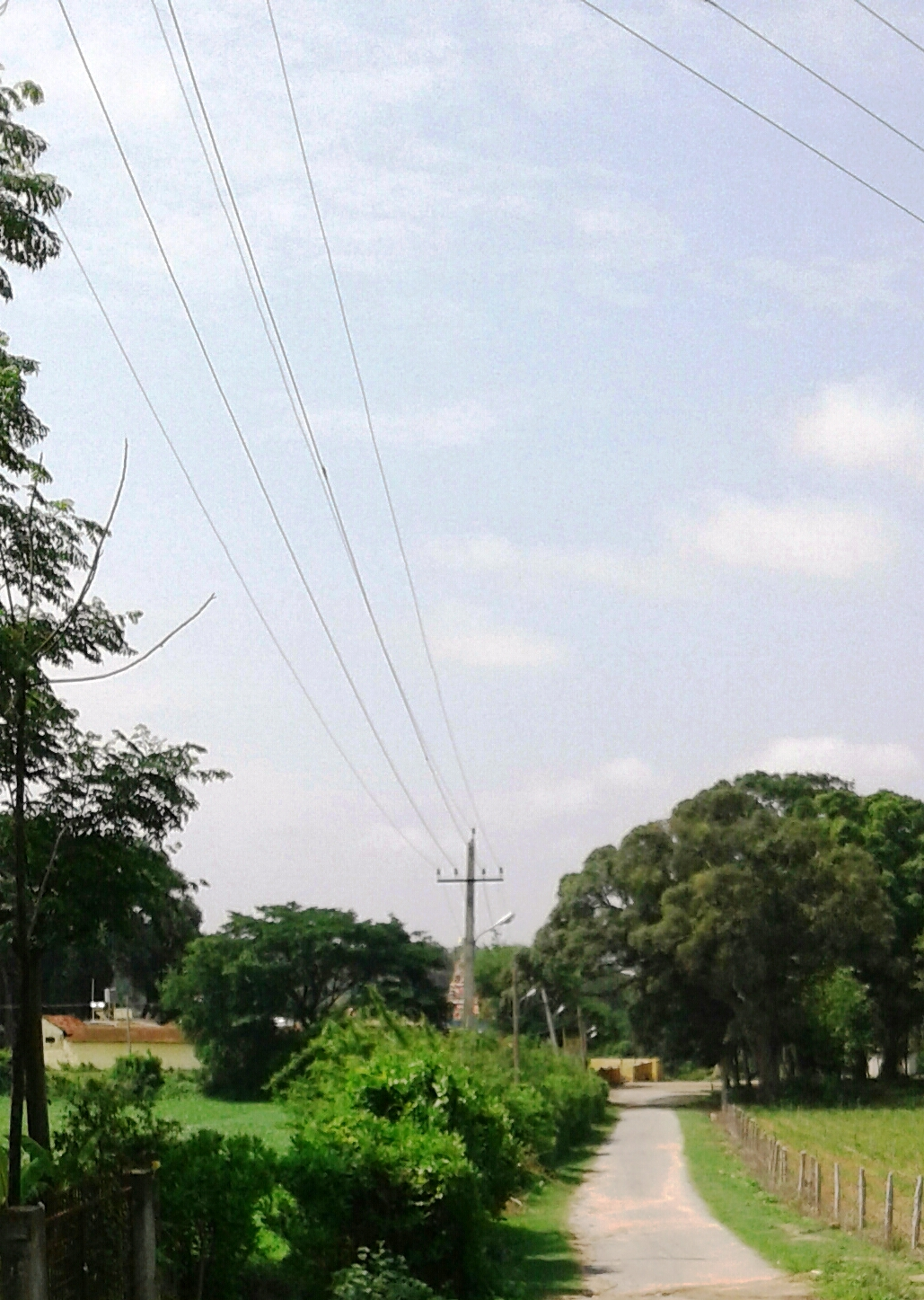
Temple Road

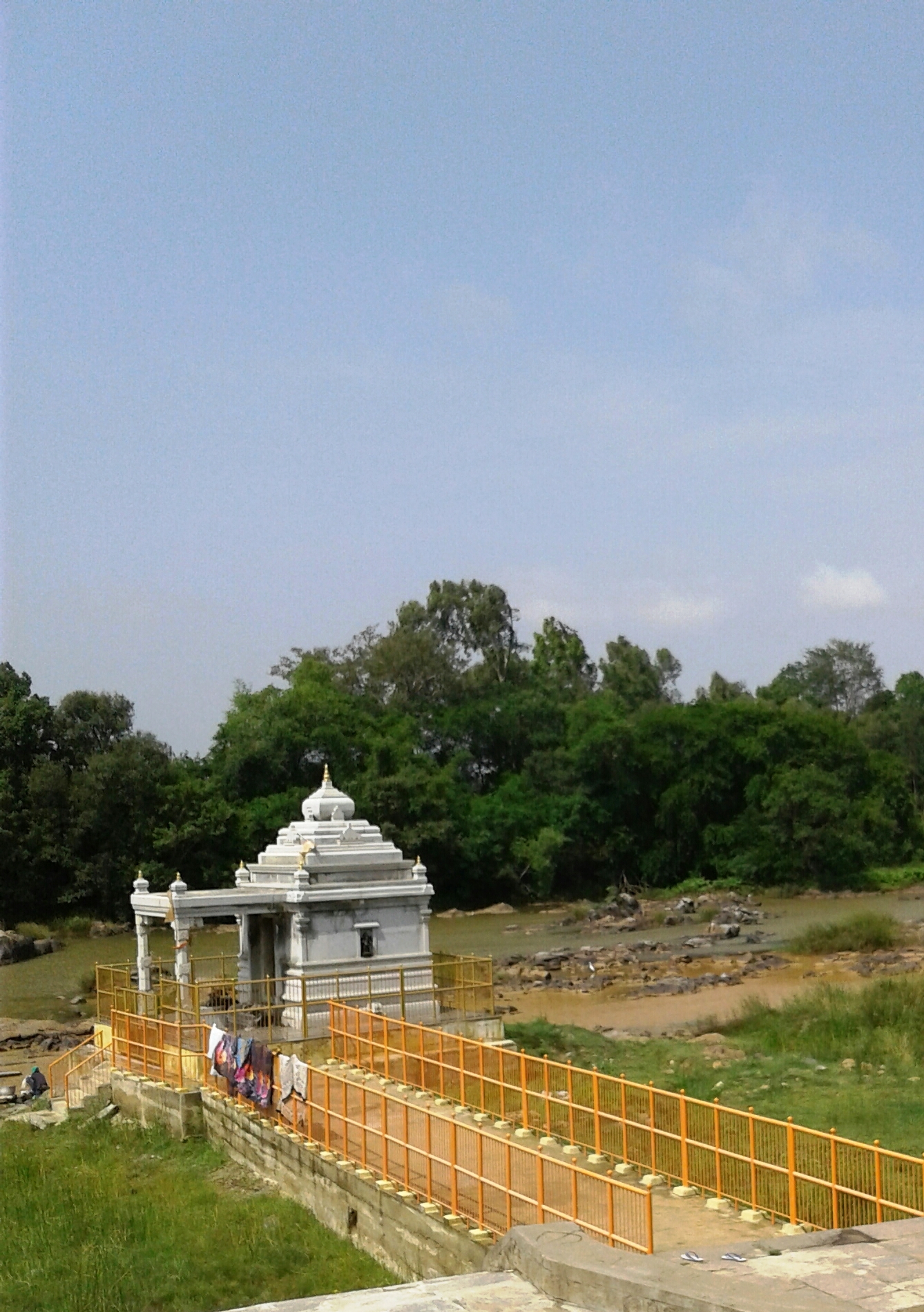
Hemavathi River

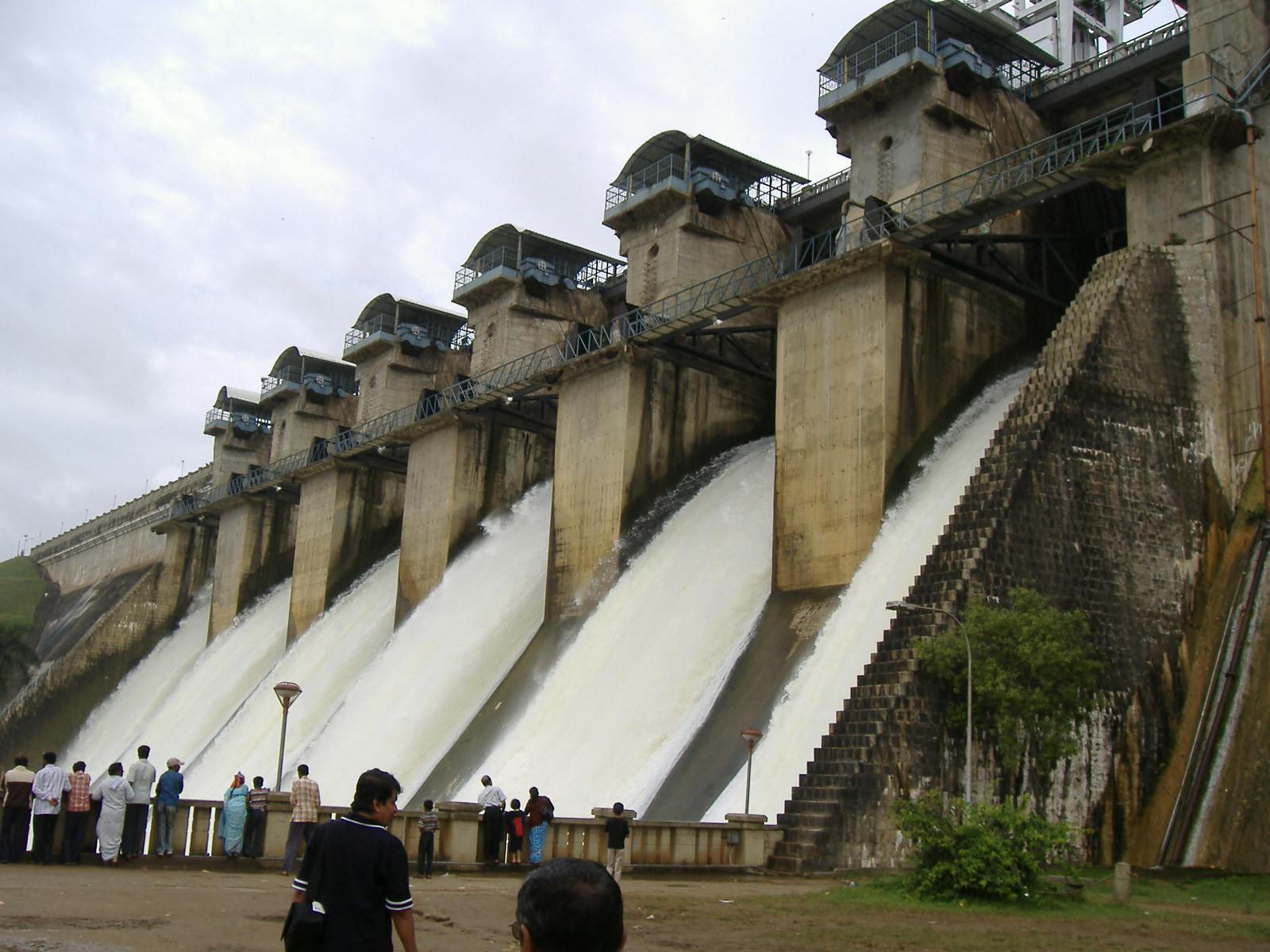
Gorur dam
