= Ajjenahalli, Alur =

Ajjenahalli
- village
- Country: India
- State: Karnataka
- District: Hassan
- Talukas: Alur

Government
  - Body: Village Panchayat

Languages
  - Official: Kannada
- Time zone: UTC+5:30 (IST)
- Nearest city: Hassan
- Civic agency: Village Panchayat

Ajjenahalli, Alur is a village in the southern state of Karnataka, India. It is located in the Alur taluk of Hassan district in Karnataka. Ajjenahalli is 12 km (7.5 mi) away from Hassan District, 19 km (12 mi) away from Mananthavadi.

== History ==
Ajjenahalli is a village that has a history dating back to the early 7th century, with the relics of Danteshwara and Varadaraja of Srirangapatna having been found in the area. The Taluk office of Hassan is located at Ajjenahalli.

== See also ==
- Hassan
- Districts of Karnataka
