= Yagachi River =

River in southern India

Yagachi
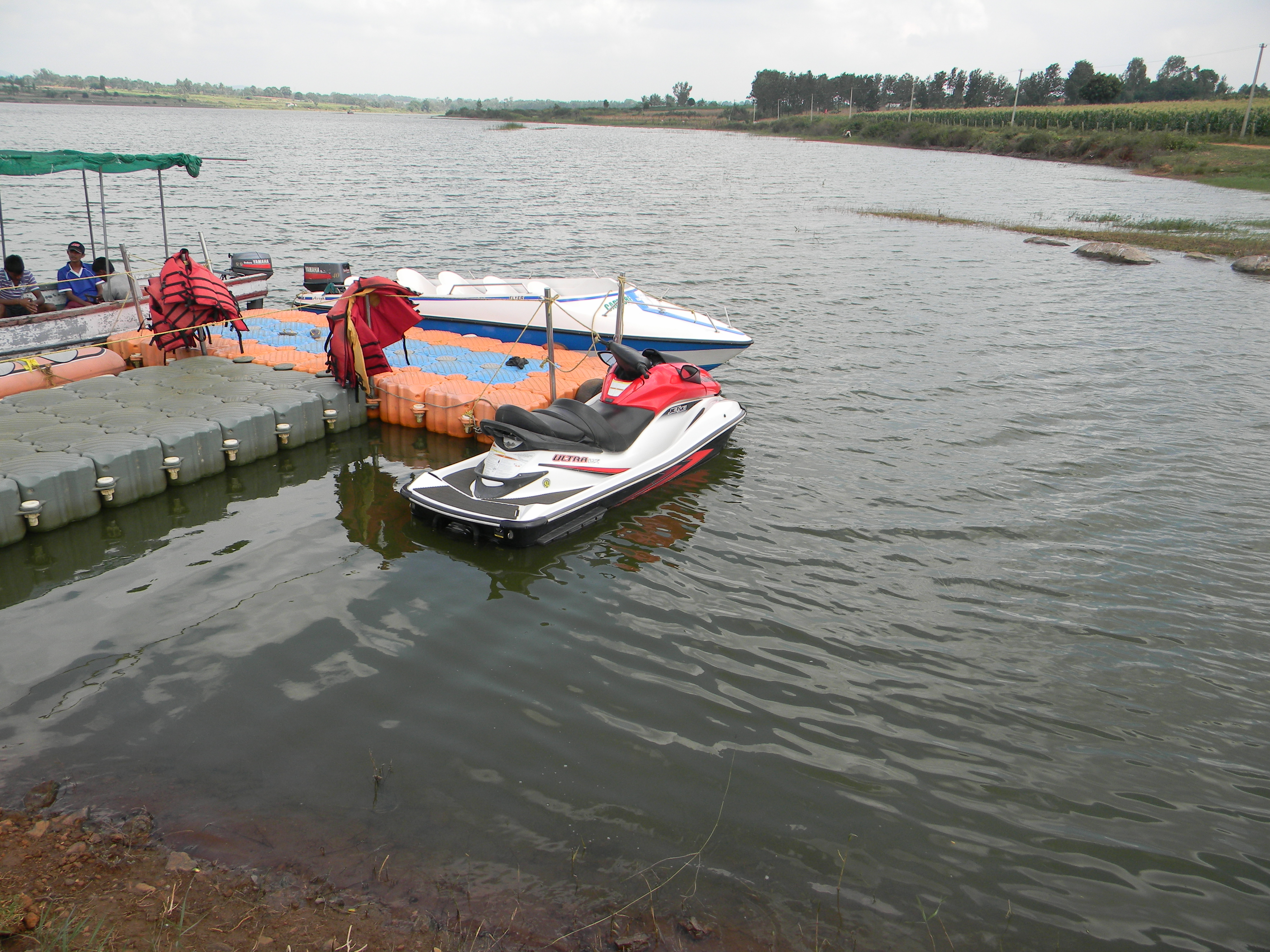

Location
- Country: India
- States: Karnataka
- Region: Southern India
- Origin: Chikkamagaluru district, Karnataka

Physical characteristics
- Source: Chandradrona Mountain Range, Chikmagalur
  - location: Karnataka, India
  - coordinates: 13.38688°N 75.71795°E
  - elevation: 1,897 m (6,224 ft)
- Mouth: Hemavati River
  - location: Gorur, Karnataka, India
  - coordinates: 12°53′41″N 76°00′01″E
  - elevation: 910 m (2,990 ft)
- Length: 60 km (37 mi)
- Basin size: 1,002 km^{2} (387 sq mi)
- Width
  - maximum: 90 metres (300 ft)
- Discharge
  - maximum: 25,000 cubic feet per second (710 m^{3}/s)

Basin features
- Tributaries
  - right: Votehole

The Yagachi is a river in Karnataka, India. It is a major tributary of Hemavati River. It rises in the Baba Budan Hill Range near the city of Chikkamagaluru, flows through Belur taluk, Hassan District. It joins the Hemavati River, near Gorur in Hassan. It has a small tributary river called Votehole or Watehole. Votehole dam is built on the stream (1.51 Tmcft) near Lakkenahalli, Belur taluk, Hassan district. The dam site is 16km from Alur taluk and 12km from Belur taluk. The dam construction was completed in the year of 1984. The length of Left bank and Right bank canal of Votehole is 10 km & 40 km respectively.

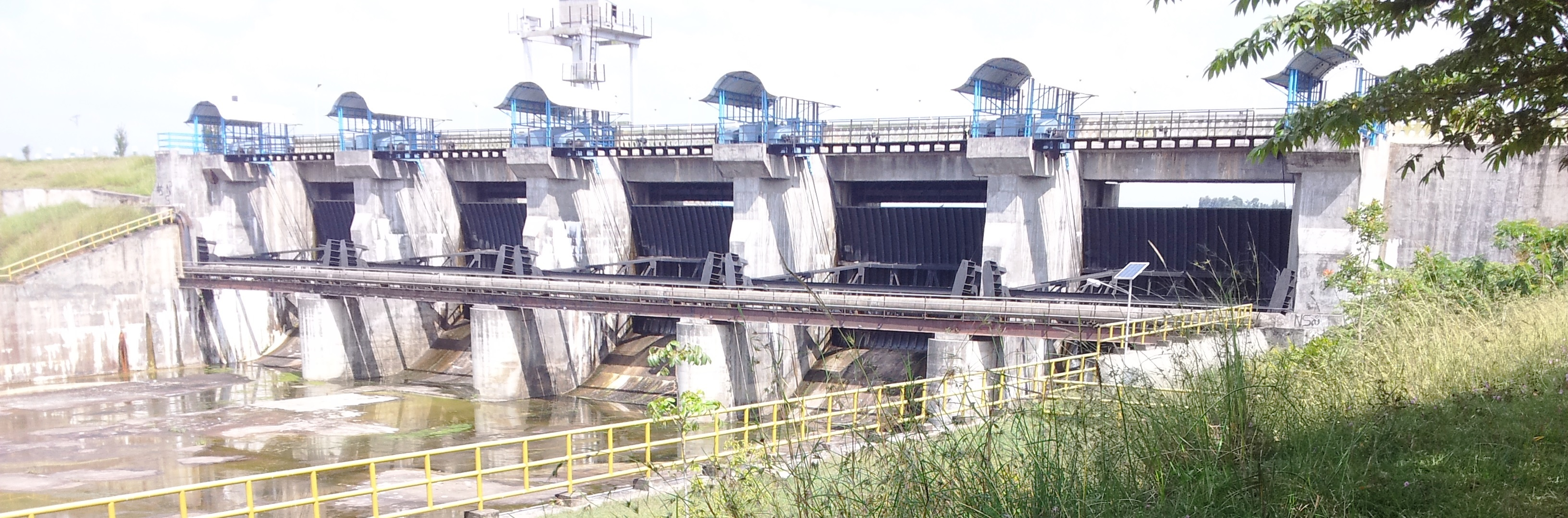
Yagachi Dam at Belur

The Yagachi dam was constructed at Belur in the year of 2001. The length of the Yagachi dam is 1,280 meters. The maximum height above the foundation of the reservoir is 26.237 meters. The Full Reservoir Level(FRL) of the reservoir is situated at an elevation of 965 metres (3,166 ft) above MSL. This FRL elevation makes it the highest dam in the state of Karnataka.

== Storage capacity ==
Yagachi dam has a Gross Storage Capacity of 3.17 Tmcft. On 10 August 2019, the dam recorded a highest outflow of about 25,000 cusecs, due to torrential rains in Chikkamagaluru Taluk. Its catchment area extends from south of Mullayyanagiri (Bababudan Range) to Gorur dam.

In 2025, the dam achieved its FRL early, in the last week of May, due to early onset of South-west Monsoon, making it the first dam to get filled in Karnataka, that year.

== Beneficiaries ==
Yagachi, along with Votehole serves as the source of irrigation and drinking water for the cities of Belur, Chikkamagaluru, Arsikere and Hassan.
