= Bylahalli =

- village
- Location in Karnataka, India Bylahalli (India)
- Coordinates: 13°2′54″N 75°59′1″E
- Country: India
- State: Karnataka
- District: Hassan

Government
  - Body: Village Panchayat

Population (2001)
  - Total: 1,285

Languages
  - Official: Kannada
- Time zone: UTC+5:30 (IST)
- PIN: 573217
- Nearest city: Hassan
- Civic agency: Village Panchayat

Bylahalli is a village situated in Hassan district in Karnataka. It is around 19 km or 12 miles from Hassan. The very old famous Lord Sri Lakshmi Janardhana Swami temple is situated exactly in middle of the village.

== See also ==
- Districts of Karnataka
