= Dudda, Hassan =

Dudda
- Village
- Dudda
- Location in Karnataka, India
- Coordinates: 13°05′15″N 76°12′17″E
- Country: India
- State: Karnataka
- District: Hassan district

Government
  - Body: Grama Panchayath

Area
  - Total: 5.53 km^{2} (2.14 sq mi)
- Elevation: 982 m (3,222 ft)

Population (2011)
  - Total: 1,906
  - Density: 345/km^{2} (893/sq mi)

Languages
  - Official: Kannada
- Time zone: UTC+5:30 (IST)
- PIN: 573118(Dudda R.S)
- Telephone code: 08172
- Vehicle registration: KA-13

Dudda is a small village and a hobli in Hassan taluk & district, in the state of Karnataka, India.

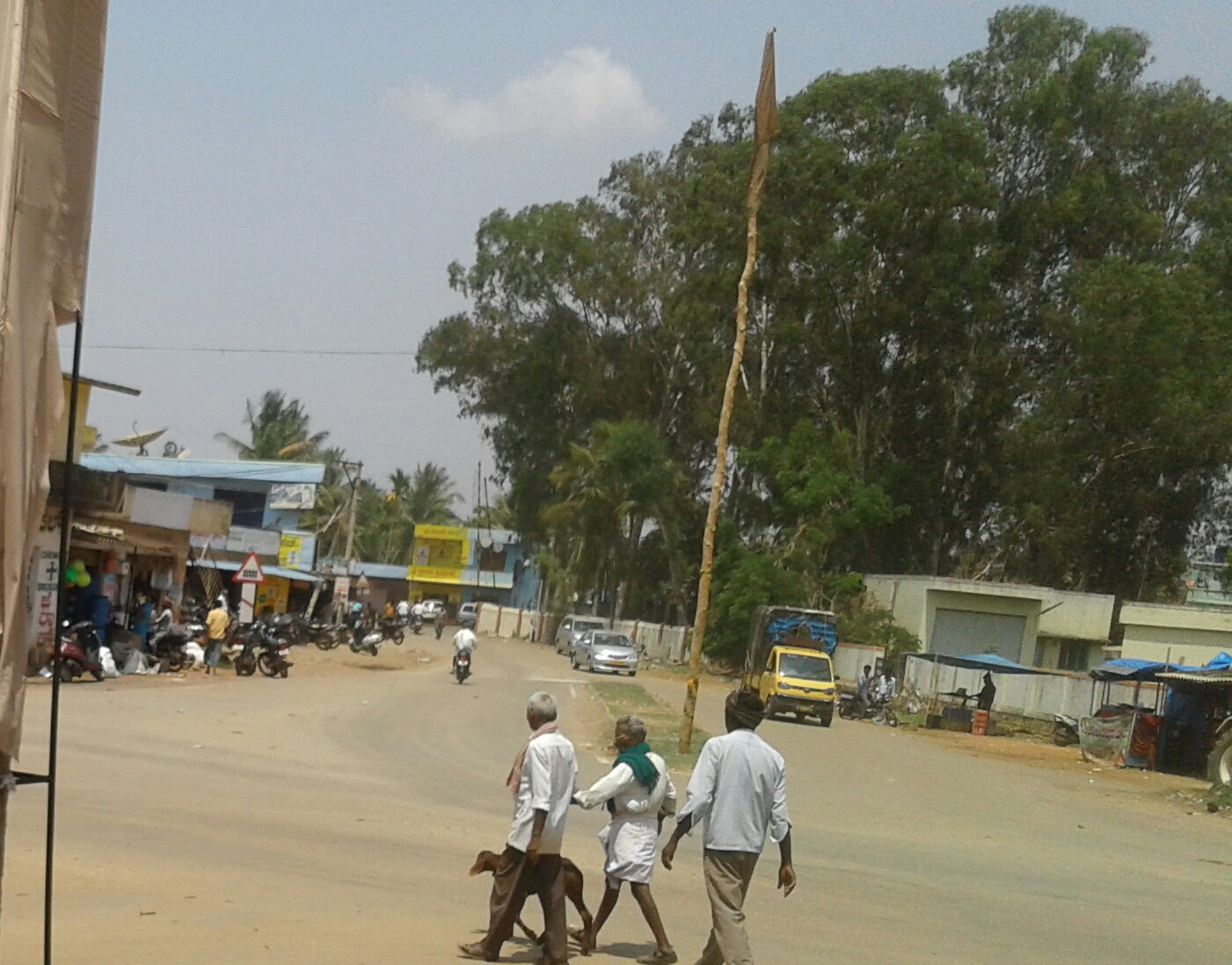
Village street

== Location ==
Dudda is located 16 km north-east of Hassan on the Arsikere road. It is 182 kilometres (113 mi) from the state capital, Bengaluru.

It lies at the point where State Highway 102 and State Highway 71 meet. No National Highways pass through Dudda, nevertheless, it is just 14 km away from Shantigrama where NH-75 passes. The Railway halt is now defunct.

== Post Office ==
There is a post office at Dudda and the PIN Code is 573118.
