= Abbana =

- village
- Location in Karnataka, India Abbana (India)
- Coordinates: 12.914°N 75.907°E
- Country: India
- State: Karnataka
- District: Hassan
- Talukas: Alur

Government
  - Body: Village Panchayat

Languages
  - Official: Kannada
- Time zone: UTC+5:30 (IST)
- Nearest city: Hassan, India
- Civic agency: Village Panchayat

Abbana is a village in the southern state of Karnataka, India. It is located in the Alur taluk of Hassan district in Karnataka.

== See also ==
- Hassan
- Districts of Karnataka
