= Gurur =

Gurur, Mysore
- Village
- Interactive map of Gurur, Mysore
- Coordinates: 12.26075°N 76.64715°E
- Country: India
- State: Karnataka
- District: Mysore

Population (2011)
  - Total: 2,292

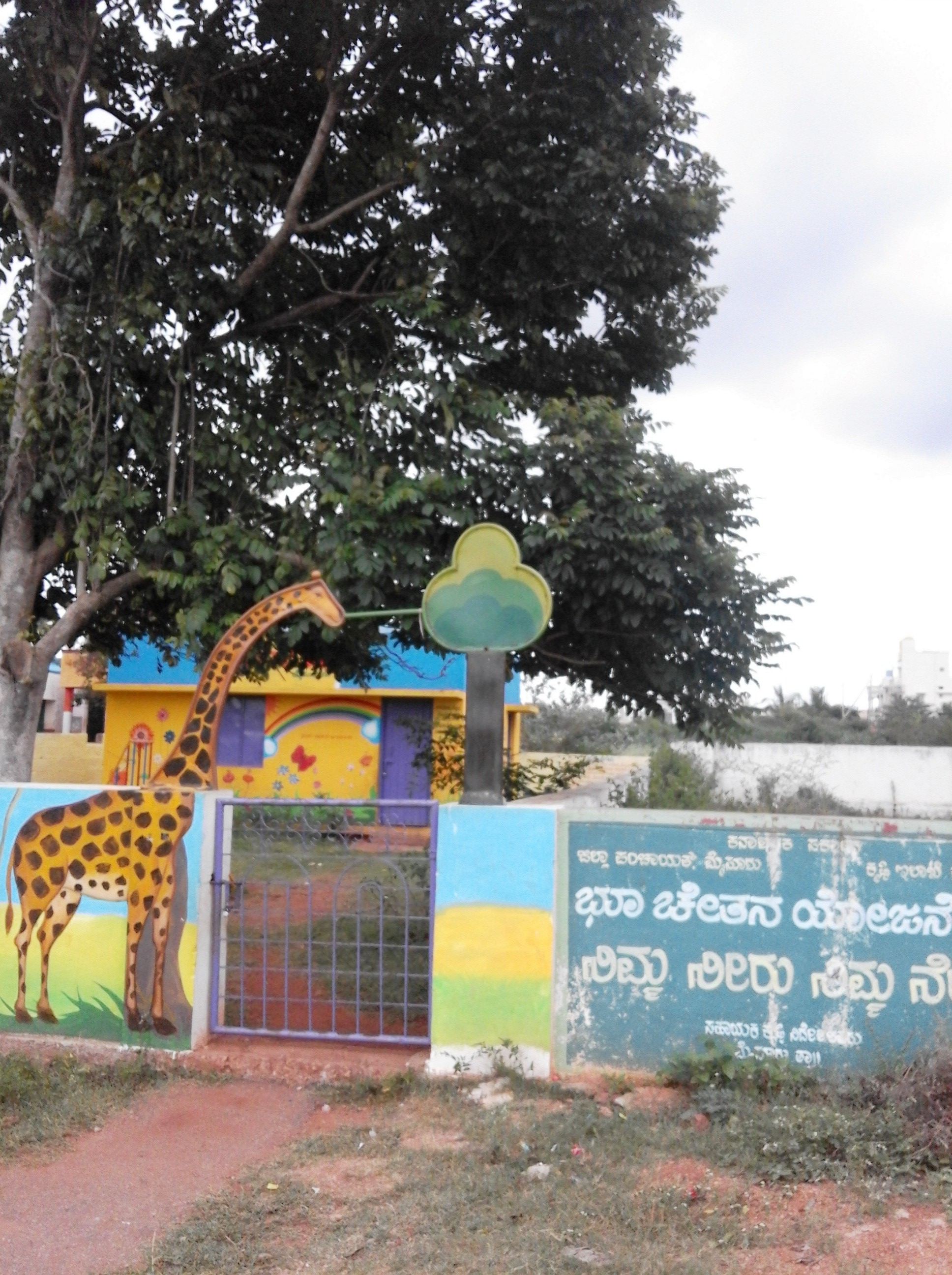
School at Gurur

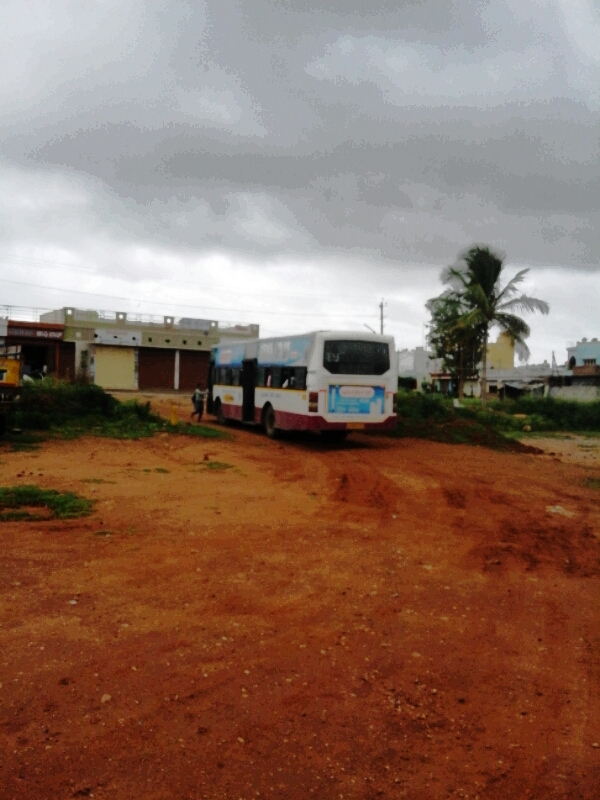
Rama Bhai Nagar, Gurur Road

Gurur is a small village in Mysore district, Karnataka, India.

== Location ==
Gurur is located on the south of Mysore city. It is at a distance of 7.9 km from Mysore city.

== Transportation ==
Bus No. 11-A goes to Gurur from the city bus station, passing through Jayaprakash Nagar and Vidyaranyapura. The nearest railway station is in Ashokapuram, Mysore. Gurur has a post office and its pincode is 570008.

== Nearby villages ==
- Ramabhai Nagar
- Sidhappa complex
- Mahadevapura
- D.Block
- Gobli Mara
- Kalalavadi
- Udburu

== Demographics ==
At the 2011 census, Gurur had a population of 2,292 people, of which 1,171 are males and the rest are females. Children below six years made up 11 per cent of the total population. The literacy rate is 68 per cent.

== Administration ==
Gorur is administered by a village head called Sarpanch who is elected by the people every five years.

== Major Landmarks ==
- S.S.E.T. National Public school, Gurur
- World Peace Centre
- Institute for Indian Art and Culture
- Kalalavadi

== See also ==
- Jayaprakash Nagar
- Vidyaranyapuram
- Gorur, Hassan

== Image Gallery ==
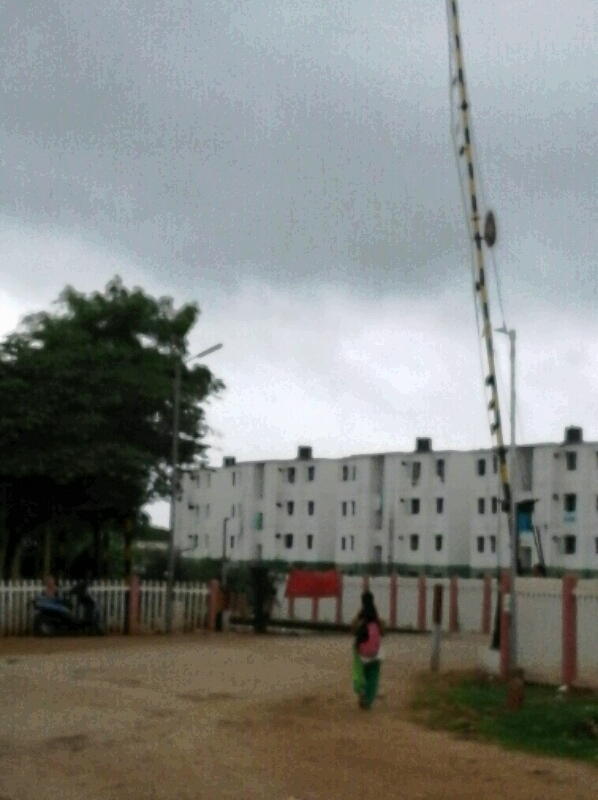
Railway gate on Gurur road

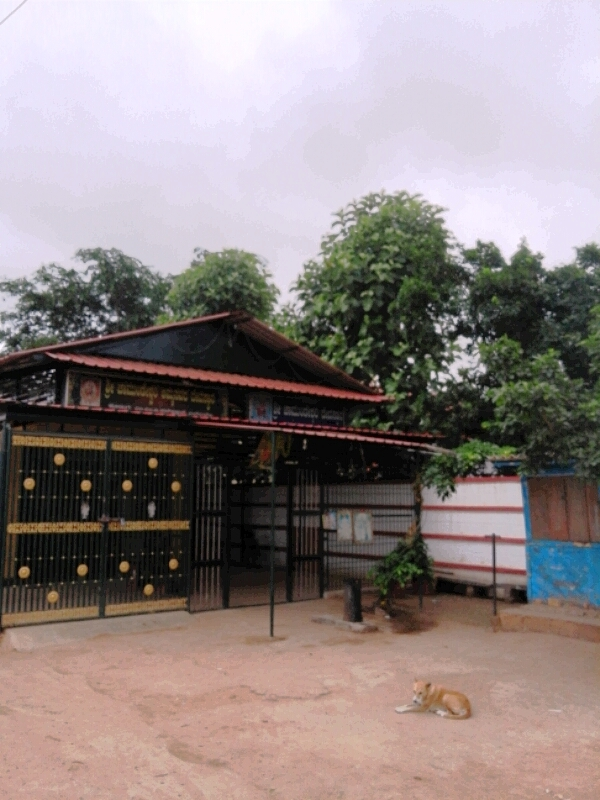
Temple at Mahadevpura
