= Addihalli, Hassan =

Addihalli
- village
- Interactive map of Addihalli
- Coordinates: 12.9749°N 76.2424°E
- Country: India
- State: Karnataka
- District: Hassan
- Talukas: Hassan

Government
  - Body: Village Panchayat

Languages
  - Official: Kannada
- Time zone: UTC+5:30 (IST)
- Nearest city: Hassan
- Civic agency: Village Panchayat

Addihalli, Hassan is a village in the southern state of Karnataka, India. It is located in the Hassan taluk of Hassan district in Karnataka.

== See also ==
- Hassan District
- Districts of Karnataka
