= State Highway 71 (Karnataka) =

Road in Karnataka, India

State Highway 71

Route information
- Maintained by Karnataka Road Development Corporation Limited
- Length: 56.87 km (35.34 mi)

Major junctions
- East end: Tipaturu
- West end: Hassan

Location
- Country: India
- State: Karnataka
- Primary destinations: Tiptur, Hassan

Highway system
- Roads in India; Expressways; National; State; Asian; State Highways in Karnataka

State Highway 71, also known as SH-71, is a state highway connecting Tiptur of Tumakuru district and Devarayapattana of Hassan district, in the South Indian state of Karnataka. It has a total length of 56.87 kilometres (35.34 mi).

Major towns and villages on the highway are: Tiptur, Maranagere, Lingadahalli, Chattanahalli, Honnenahalli, Tadasuru, Melapura, Lakkihalli, Kenkere, Marashettihalli, Honnakumarana Halli (Gandasi Handpost), Manjenahalli, Rudradevara Halli, Dudda, Chikka Kadaluru, Koravangala Cross, Cheeranahalli, B.T Koppalu and Devarayapattana (Hassan outskirts).

This highway, along with SH-102 (Arsikere-Dudda) forms the entire stretch of Hassan-Arsikere highway.
