= Hasanamba Temple =

Hindu temple in Karnataka, India

Hāsanāmbā Temple

- Location within Karnataka

Religion
- Affiliation: Hinduism
- District: Hassan
- Deity: Saptamatrika(s) (7 sisters)
- Festival: Deepavali

Location
- Location: Hassan taluk
- State: Karnataka
- Country: India
- Coordinates: 13.0024267°N 76.0933586°E

Architecture
- Type: Hoysala tradition of temple architecture
- Completed: c. 12th century CE

Hāsanāmbā temple is a Hindu temple located in Hassan district, Karnataka, India, dedicated to the Goddess Shakti, also called as Ambā or Ambe which means mother. The city Hassan is named after the goddess 'Hāsanāmbā', 'Hasanamma' or 'Haasanadamma', meaning the smiling mother also according to the Kannada term 'Hasanu' (ಹಸನು) means fertility, It is believed that the goddess bestow the life with fertility and grace. The temple was built in the 12th century CE. The temple is opened once a year during the Hindu festival Deepavali in October.

Hasanaba Temple Front view

== History ==
It is believed that the temple was constructed by a local chieftain Sanjeeva Krishnappa Nayaka in the 12th century CE, although the exact date is unknown. Earlier, Hassan was known as 'Simhāsanapuri' and later got the name of 'Hāsana'. It is said that during the rule of Hoysala dynasty in 12th century CE an idol was found with its face wearing a pleasant smile. Hasana mukhi or a smiling face was transformed into Hassan.

Archeological experts consider the Hasanamba Temple to be an example of the epitome of temple architecture in Karnataka. The city of Hassan dates back to the 11th century CE and the temples around Hassan signify the various dynasties that have ruled ever since the 11th century CE. It was originally built by the Hoysala dynasty in their tradition, reflecting their faith in Hinduism. The temples in the Hassan district are some of the examples of the Hoysala tradition of temple architecture.

== Architecture ==
There is an ant-hill representing the presiding deity inside the temple premises. There is an unusual image depicting the demon-king Ravana's with nine heads, instead of ten, playing the instrument veena.

Siddeshwara Swamy can be seen inside the temple, which is unusual as it is not depicted in the Linga roopa. It appears as Lord Shiva giving pashupatastra to Arjuna.

== Religious Significance ==
Because the temple is open only for two weeks annually, it is considered special to obtain a darshan during the Deepavali festival. For the remainder of the year, the goddess is left with a ghee-lit lamp (nandaa deepa), flowers, water and two bags of rice as an offering (naivedya) until the next year. The lamp burns for the entire duration of the temple closure, with the ghee never depleting. It is believed that the rice offering remains warm and unspoiled when the doors are reopened. It is revered as a great temple in Hassan.

Hasanaba Devi Temple

== Legend ==
Once when the seven Matrikas (Kannada: Sapta-Maatrukeyaru) - Brahmi, Maheshwari, Kaumari, Vaishnavi, Varahi, Indrani and Chamundi came floating from Varanasi to South India, they were taken aback by the pristine beauty of Hassan and decided to reside here. Maheshwari, Kaumari and Vaishnavi settled in the three anthills inside the temple, Brahmi in Kenchammana Hosakote, Alur taluk while Indrani, Varahi and Chamundi chose the three wells in Devigere (lake).

Hassan city was named after Hasanamba goddess. As per local legend the 'Haasana' is abridged form of 'Simhasanapuri' a place associated with Janamejaya, he was great-grandson of Pandava hero Arjuna. According to mythology Janamejaya had lived in Simhasanapuri during his cursed period.

While the goddess is regarded benevolent, she is said to be harsh to those who harm her devotees. There is a belief that a mother-in-law of a devotee of Hasanamba used to ill-treat her always. Once as she was praying in front of the goddess, the mother-in-law came after her and screamed - What is important to you, Coming to the temple or your duties? Saying this, she hit her hard on the head with a cup. The daughter-in-law screamed 'Amba' and asked for protection. Devi turned her into a stone and kept her under her protection in the temple premise. The stone is called 'Sose kallu' (stone of the daughter-in-law) by locals. It is believed that the stone keeps moving by the size of a paddy grain towards goddess every year, when it reaches the icon of Hasanamba the period of Kali Yuga will end.

According to another legend once four robbers tried to rob jewellery of Hasanamba and devi turned them into stones, these four stones can be seen in 'Kallapana gudi'. There is another temple in the premise which is dedicated to Siddheshwara swamy (lord Shiva), The stone of the image depicts that Shiva giving pashupatastra to Arjuna. This Siddheshwara temple is available for daily darshan, but Goddess Hasanamba temple is opened once a year depending on the Hindu calendar, the duration varies each year. The temple only opens on the following Thursday of the full moon day in the month of Ashwija, The temple closes the next day of Deepavali's Bali Padyami. On the day of Balipadyami a fair (Raavanothsava and Chandramandalothsava) will be held, it is dedicated to Lord Siddheshwara swamy.

== Media gallery ==
Sri Hassanaamba Devi Darshan & Sri Siddeshwara Swamy Jatra Mahotsava (2026)

Front of temple

Saptamatrika sculptures

Temple decorations

Artificial flowers in the fair
