= Shettihalli Rosary Church =

Gothic church ruins

Rosary Church
- Shettihalli Rosary Church
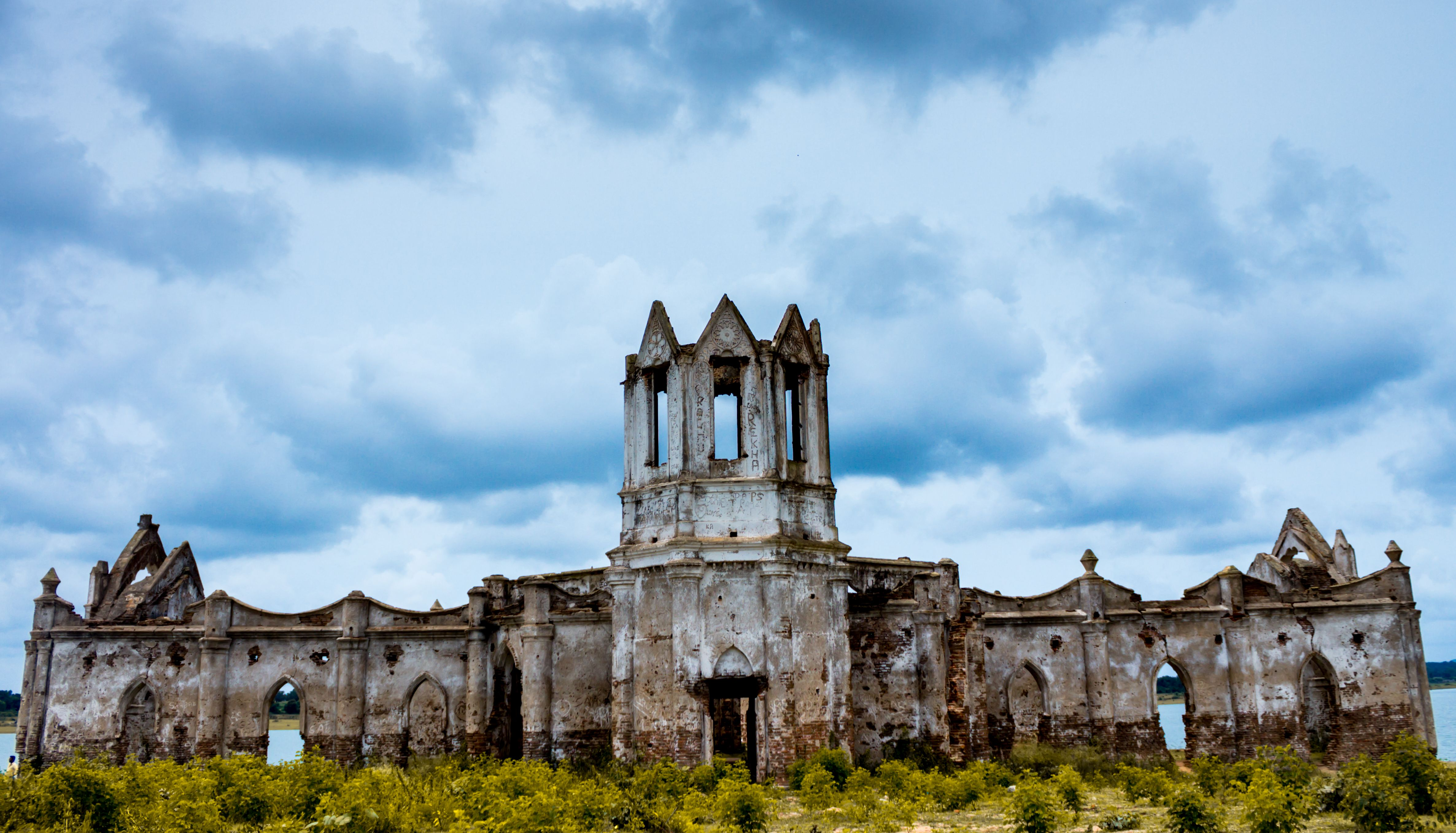
- View from the North side

- Location within Karnataka
- 12.8697160°N 76.0181845°E
- Location: Shettihalli, Karnataka
- Country: India

Architecture
- Architectural type: Gothic Architecture
- Completed: 1860s

Shettihalli Church (referred to as Sathalli in colonial documents) is located 2km from Shettihalli, Hassan district in Karnataka. Built in the 1860s by the French missionaries in India, the church is a magnificent structure of Gothic Architecture. After the construction of the Hemavati Dam and Reservoir in 1960 the church was Submerged under water due to the dam. It has since then become a famous tourist spot where people flock to see the half submerged church during monsoon. It is also known as The Submerged Church or The Floating Church.

== History ==
The Church was built in 1860 by the French missionaries for the wealthy British estate owners. In 1960 the construction of the Hemavati Dam and Reservoir led to the abandonment of the church. Since then the church submerges in water every year during monsoon season. It attracts a lot of tourists who visit the ruins to see this spectacular sight.

== Visitation ==
To enjoy the surreal beauty of Shettihalli church, one needs to travel to this place twice. Once in the month of July–October when it is partially submerged in water and next in the month of Dec–May when the water level recedes and the church grounds emerge. By road, the distance between Shettihalli and Bangalore is 200 km and can be easily accessed through roads. Buses are available as well which drop to Shettihalli Church. Trains frequent on a daily basis from Yashwantpur railway station to Hassan, Karnataka, which is the nearest town, approximately 40 km from Shettihalli.

== Digitizing ==
The church was digitized by creating a 3D model that is available to the public domain by axesmap. Viewers can experience the Shettihalli Church through virtual reality. Viewers can find it here.

== Gallery ==
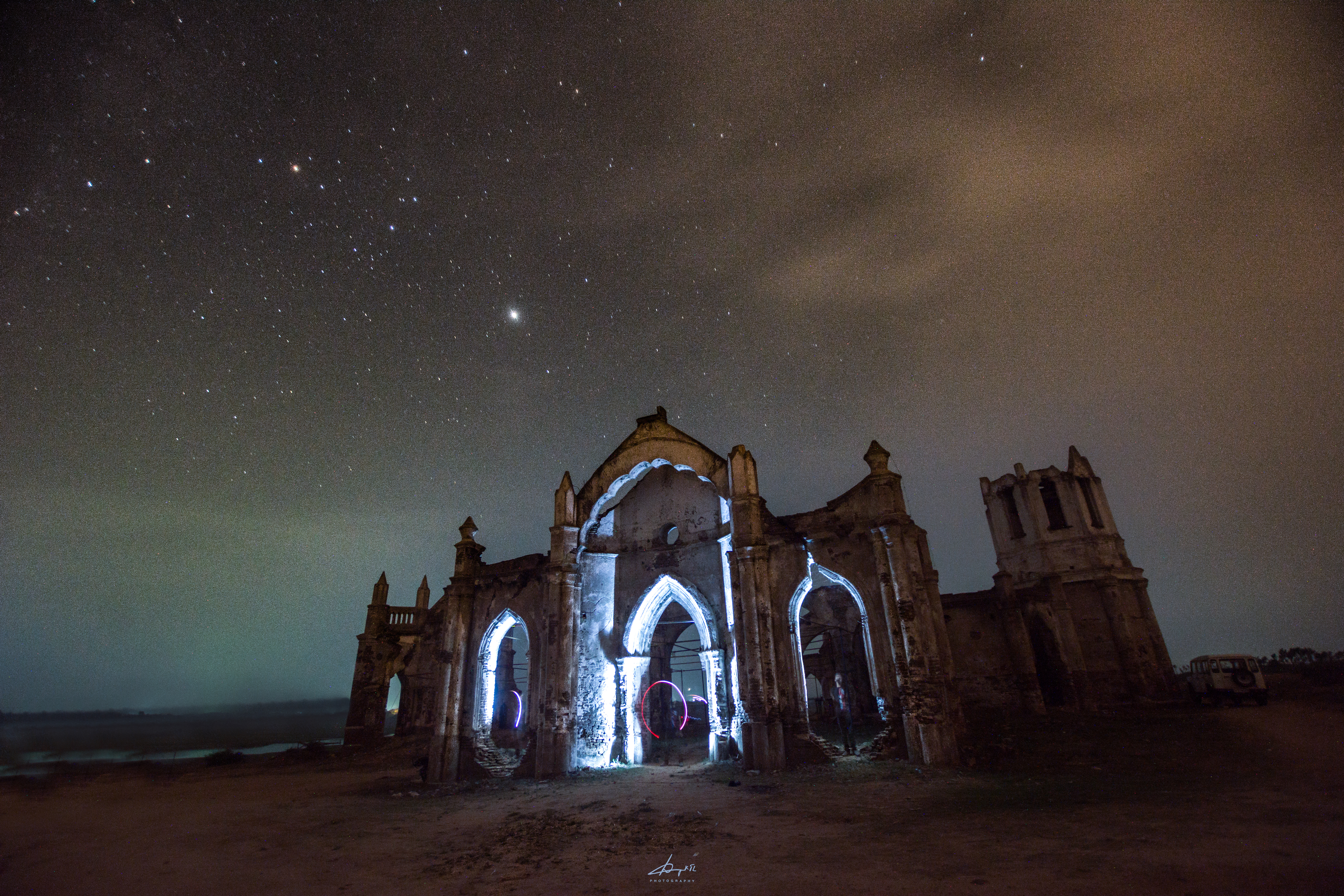
Night view

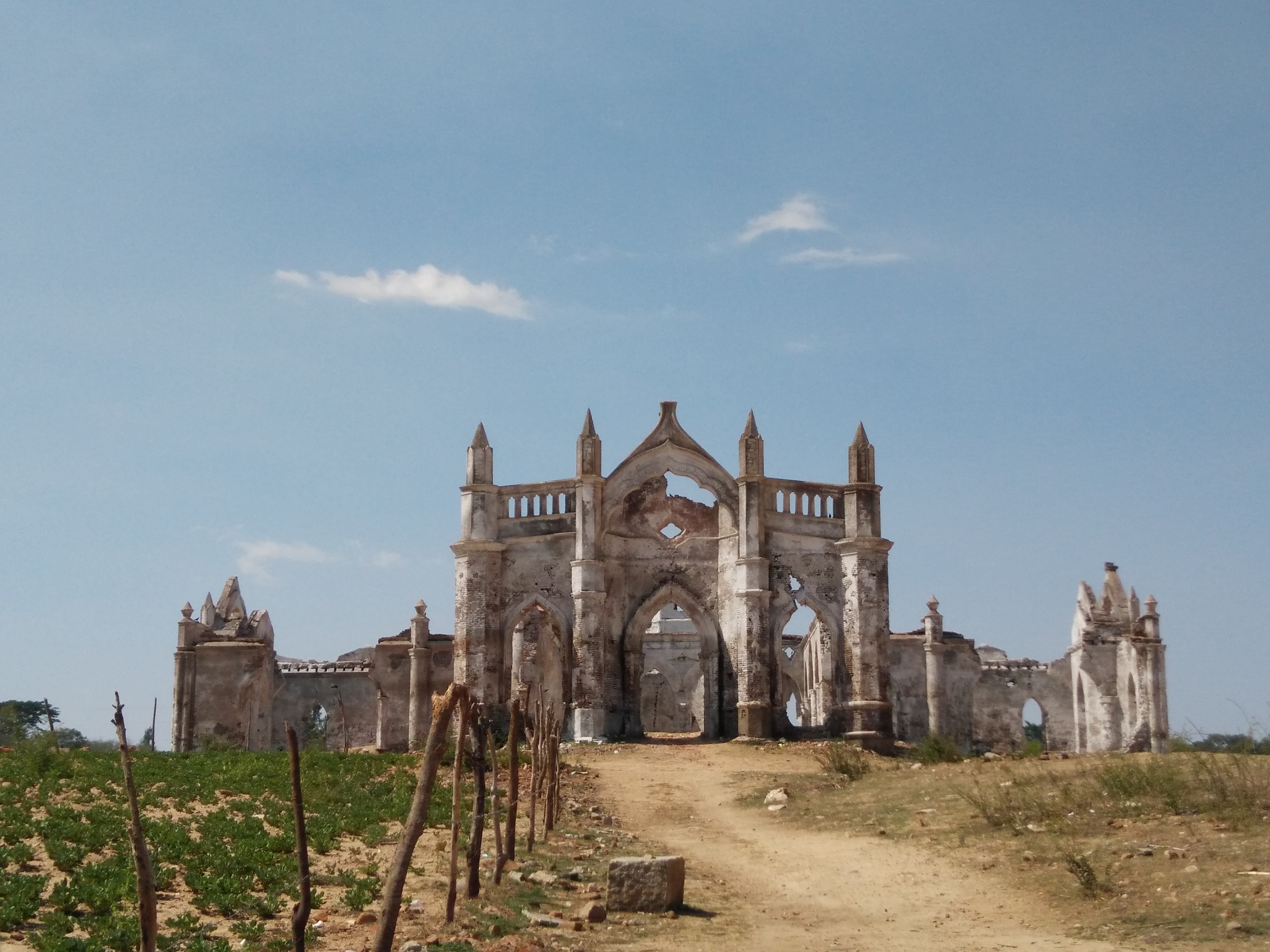
Shettihalli Rosary Church

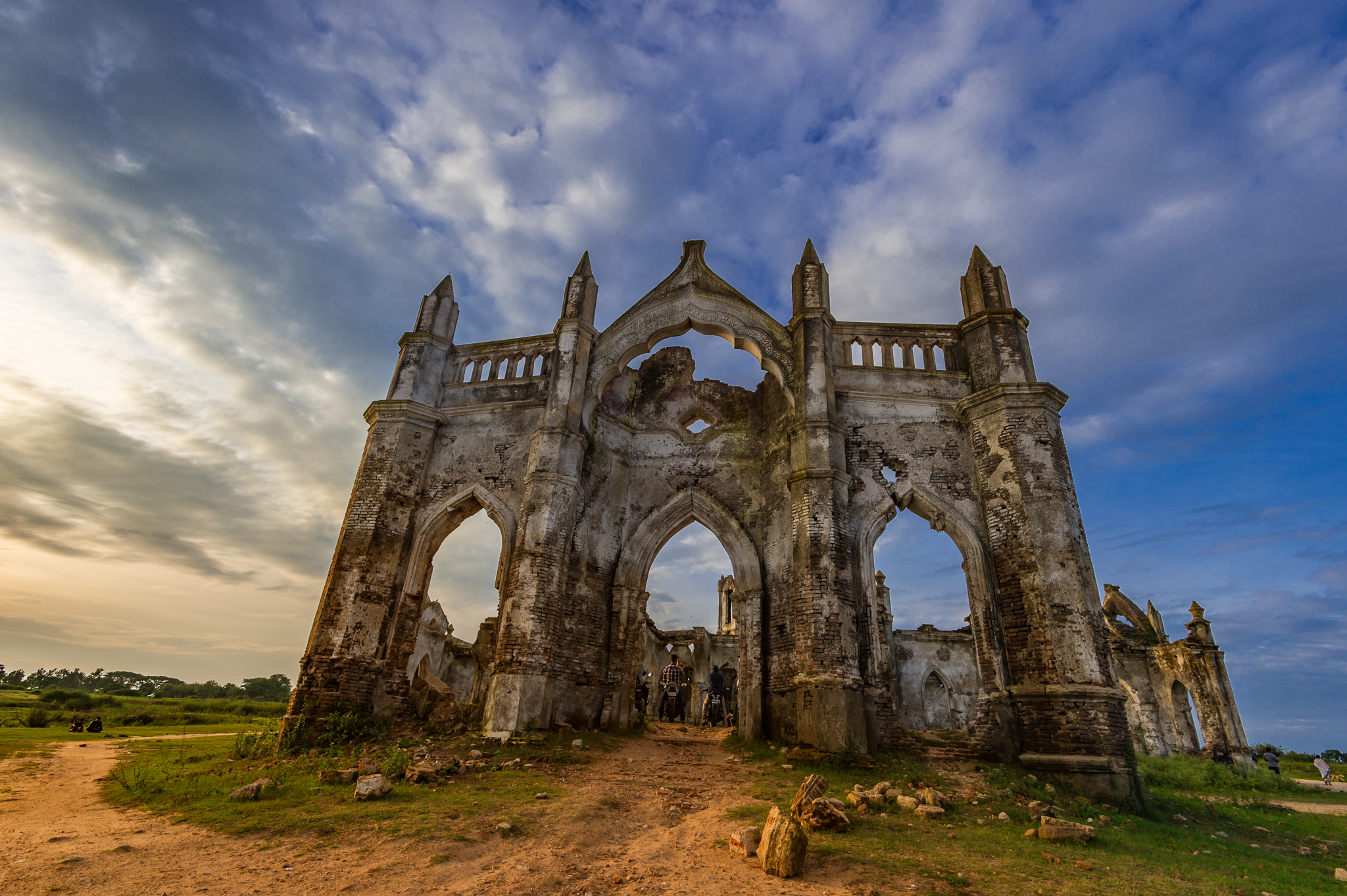
Shettihalli Rosary Church

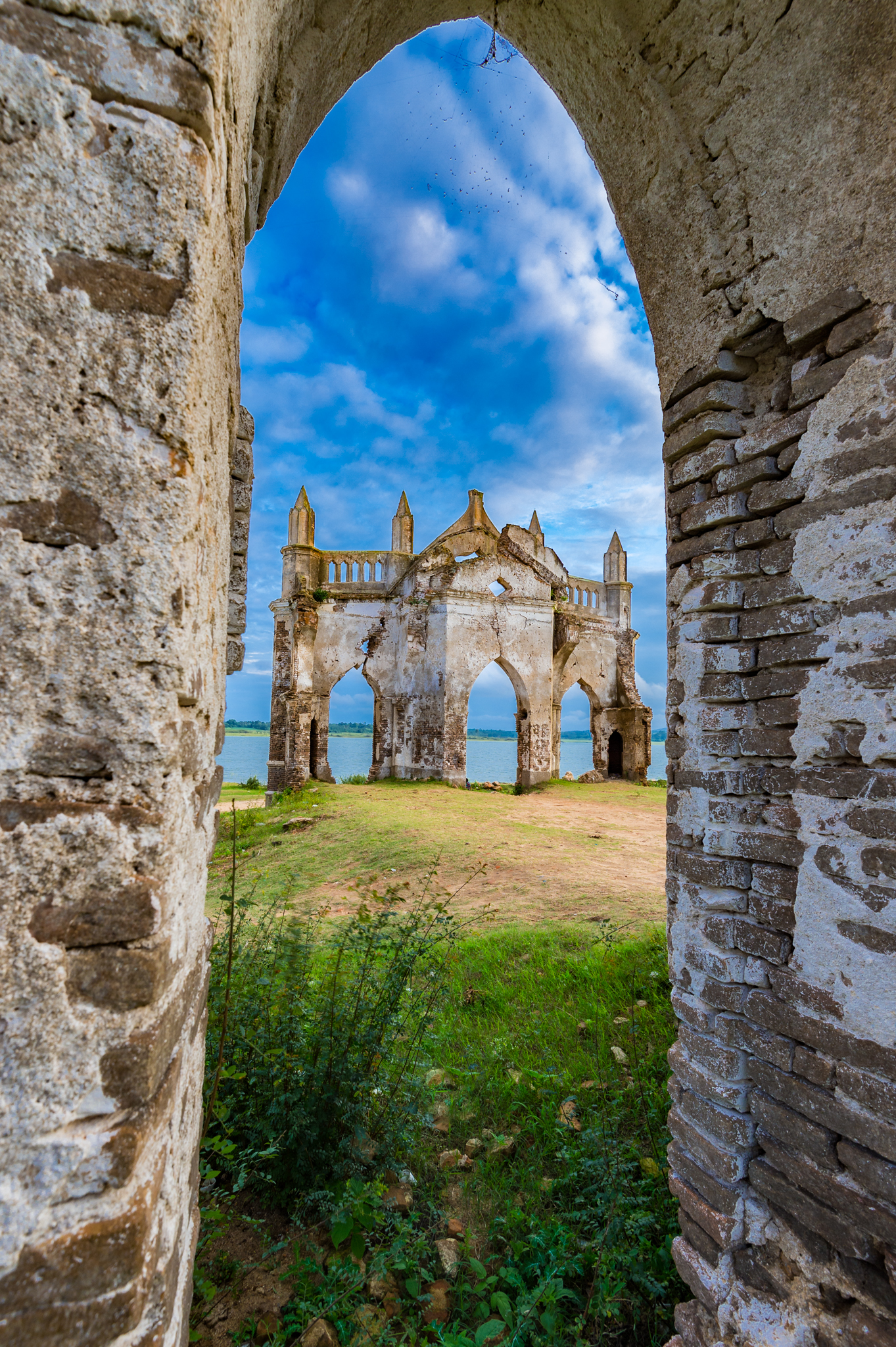
French Arches of the church

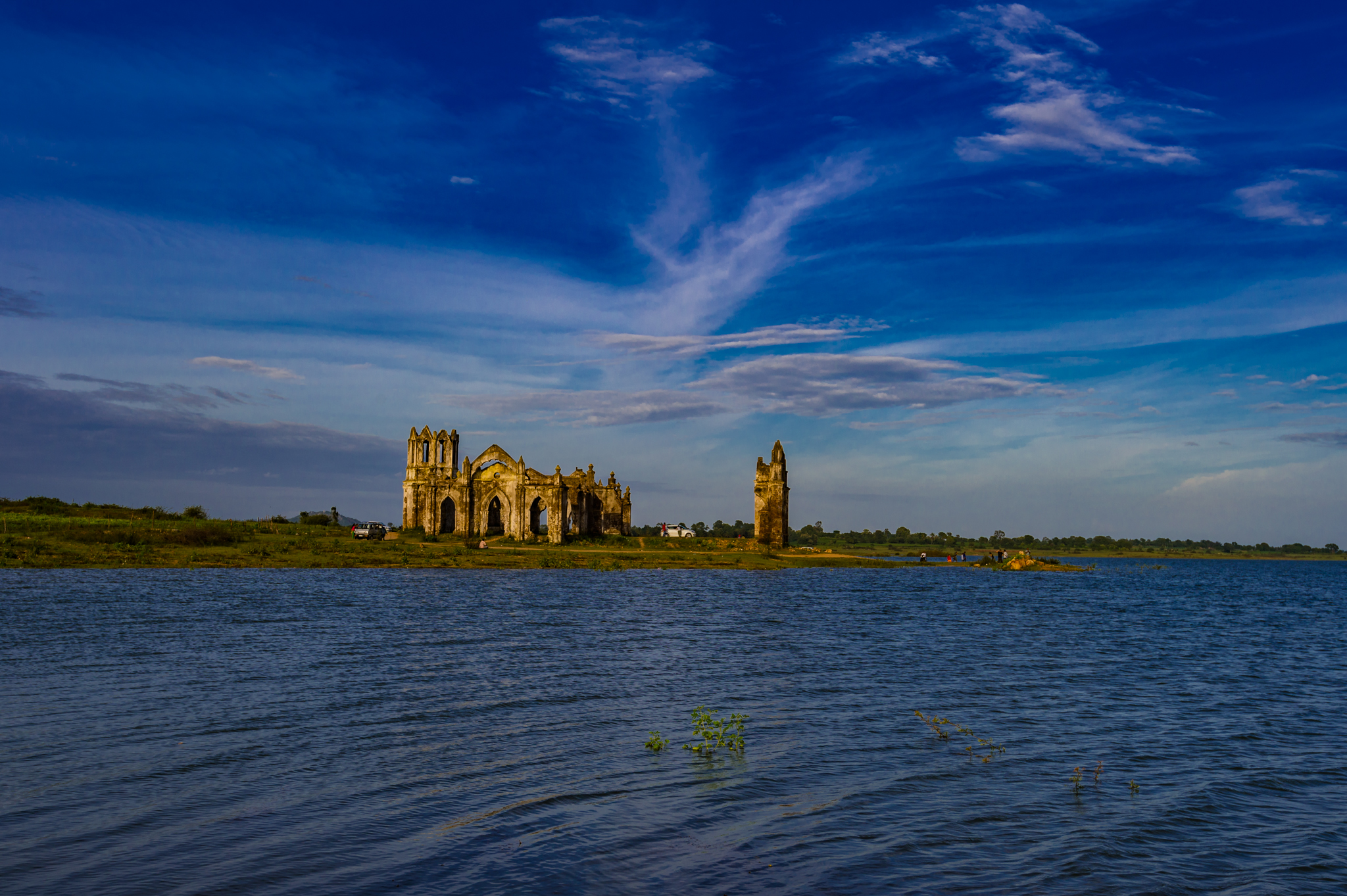
View from the Hemavathi Reservoir, Shettihalli Rosary Church
