= Udburu =

Coordinates: 23°02′N 85°22′E

- village
- Interactive map of Udburu
- Country: India
- State: Karnataka
- District: Mysore
- Talukas: Mysore

Government
  - Type: Panchayat raj
  - Body: Gram panchayat

Population (2001)
  - Total: 8,080

Languages
  - Official: Kannada
- Time zone: UTC+5:30 (IST)
- ISO 3166 code: IN-KA
- Vehicle registration: KA
- Website: karnataka.gov.in

Udburu is a village in the southern state of Karnataka, India. It is located in the Mysore taluk of Mysore district in Karnataka.

== Demographics ==
As of 2001 India census, Udburu had a population of 8080 with 4106 males and 3974 females.

== Major Landmarks ==
- World Peace Centre, Institute for Indian Art and Culture, Kalalavadi

== See also ==
- Mysore
- Districts of Karnataka
