= Hemavati River =

River in India

Coordinates: 12°34′N 76°27′E

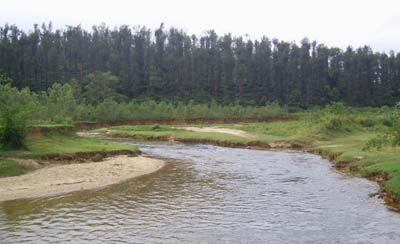
River Hemavati at the southern side of Banakal

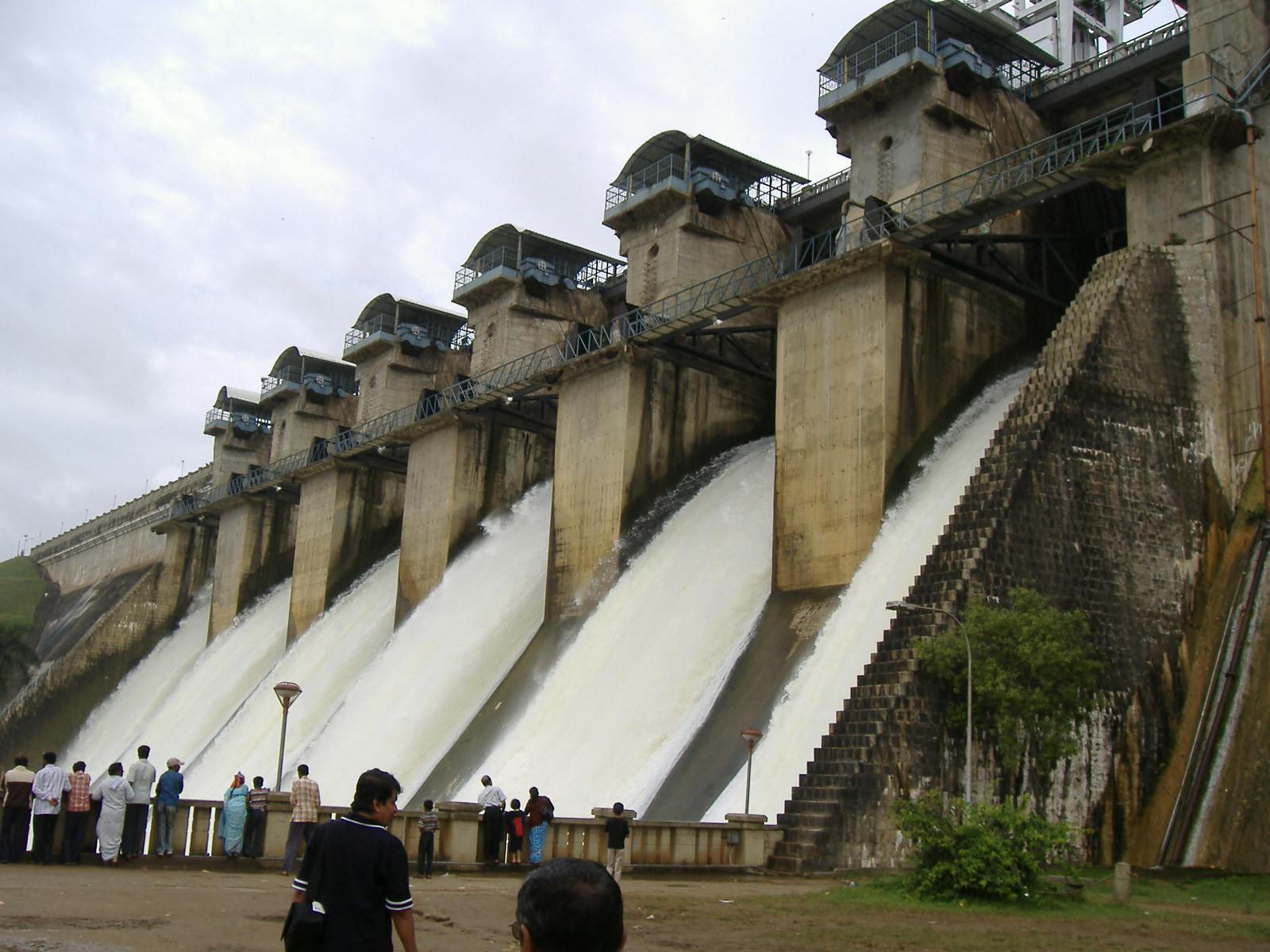
Hemavati dam in Gorur

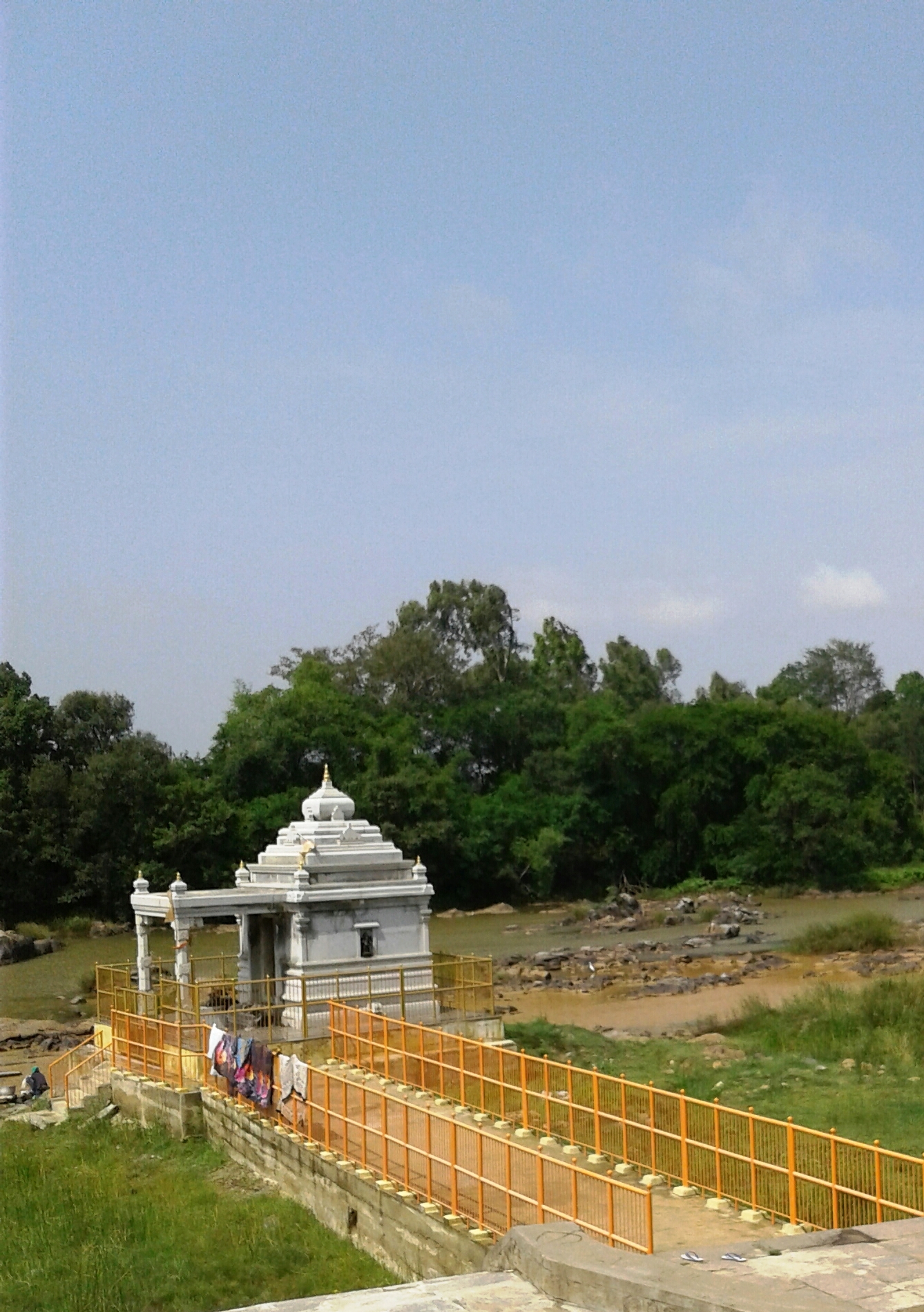

The Hemavati is a river in southern India's Karnataka and an important tributary of the Kaveri.

== Origin and course ==
The source of the Hemavati River lies in the Western Ghats (Javali village) at an elevation of about 1,230 metres (4,040 ft). Located in Mudigere taluk of Chikmagalur District in the state of Karnataka, it flows through Hassan District where it is joined by its chief tributary the Yagachi River and then into Mandya district before joining the Kaveri near Krishnarajasagara. It is approximately 245 km long and has a drainage area of about 5,410 km^{2}.

== Hemavati Dam and Reservoir ==
Gorur dam across the Hemavati was completed in 1979 above Gorur in Hassan district and downstream from the Yagachi confluence. The dam is a masonry dam with a central spillway through six radial gates. It is 44.5 meters in height and 4692 meters long with an area of 9162 hectares. The reservoir has a live storage capacity of 35.7 TMC. The dam provides irrigation and drinking water not only for major portion of Hassan and Mandya districts, but also to far away regions of Tumkur district, that fall under Krishna River basin.

The Shettihalli Rosary Church, which was submerged during the construction of the dam, can be seen only when the water level is low during the summer months. The church was constructed in the Gothic architectural style by French missionaries in the 1860s. The church was abandoned in 1960 when the government decided to build the dam. When the water level is low coracles are used to go inside the church.
