= Gorur dam =

Gorur Dam
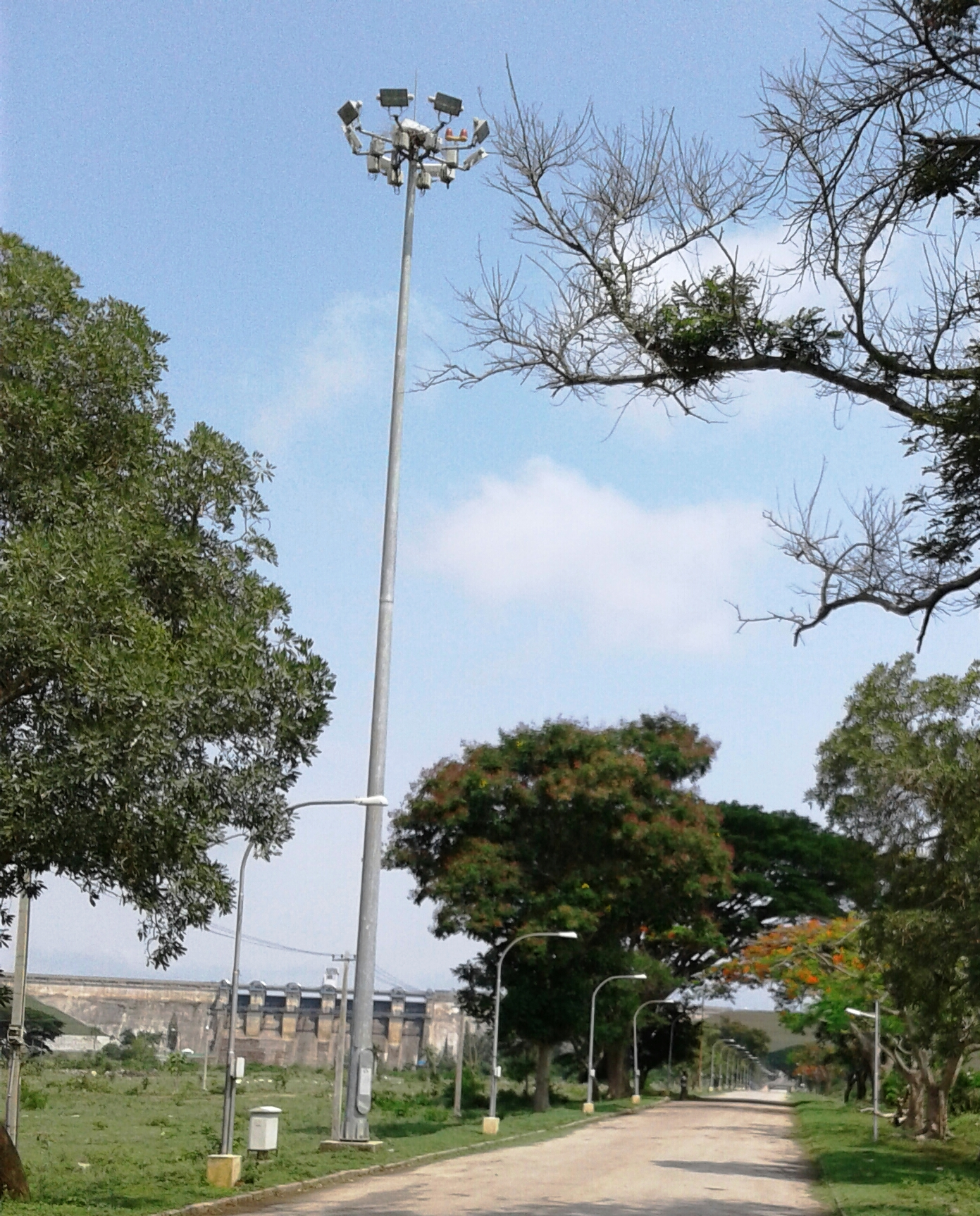
- Interactive map of Gorur Dam
- Official name: Gorur Reservoir
- Location: Gorur village, Hassan, Karnataka
- Coordinates: 12.822157°N 76.054533°E
- Opening date: 1979

Dam and spillways
- Impounds: Hemavati River
- Height: 58.5 meters
- Length: 4692 meters

Reservoir
- Creates: Hemavati Reservoir
- Total capacity: 37.10 Tmcft
- Catchment area: 2,810 km^{2}

The Gorur Dam is constructed across the Hemavati river in 1979. The dam is located in Gorur village of Hassan district, Karnataka.

Gorur Dam is a large reservoir covering a catchment area of 2,810 km^{2}. With the length of 4,692 meters and a height of 58.5 meters the reservoir has gross storage capacity of 1,050.63 mcm.
