= Alur, Hassan =

Alur, Hassan Aaluru
- Town
- Location in Karnataka, India
- Coordinates: 12.9780456°N 75.9830654°E
- Country: India
- State: Karnataka
- District: Hassan
- Region: Malenadu

Government
  - Body: Town Panchayath

Area
  - Town: 2 km^{2} (0.77 sq mi)
  - Rural: 420.92 km^{2} (162.52 sq mi)
- Elevation: 974 m (3,196 ft)

Population (2011)
  - Town: 6,541
  - Density: 3,300/km^{2} (8,500/sq mi)
  - Rural: 78,714

Languages
  - Official: Kannada
- Time zone: UTC+5:30 (IST)
- PIN: 573213
- Telephone code: 08170
- ISO 3166 code: IN-KA
- Vehicle registration: KA-46
- Website: www.alurtown.mrc.gov.in/en

Alur also spelled as Alooru is a town panchayat and the taluk in Hassan district in the state of Karnataka, India. It is 14 km from Hassan City. Alur town is offset by 2 km from NH-75. Alur has a railway station, named "Alur Halt", located on Mangalore-Hassan-Mysore line. But no train stops at this station. Alur became a Full-fledged taluk in the year 1941.

== History ==
Alur evolved from a small settlement into a formal administrative sub-division and taluk headquarters in 1941. Parts of taluk such as Ajjenahalli feature archaeological relics stretching back to the early 7th century.

== Legend and Religious Significance ==
Local tradition notes that one of the 'Sapthamatrikas' (Brahmi) settled in the village of Kenchammana hosakote, as Kenchamba, mirroring the Goddess Hasanamba of Hassan city. According to a folklore, the demons Raktabījasura and Andhaka were defeated here by Brahmi along with fellow Matrikas, this place is considered to be the battlefield, it is believed that, the drops of the blood fell here from the body of Raktabījasura so the soil of this area turned red. It is said that the red soil can be seen still and after killing the demon Raktabīja, the goddess Brahmi got the local name- 'Kenchāmba' or 'Kenchamma', meaning: 'Kencha' means Red colour and 'Amba' means mother in Kannada language.

== Geography ==
Alur taluk lies in the foothills of the Western Ghats and roughly 2km off National Highway 75, situated at an average altitude of roughly 975 meters (1,399 feet) above sea level. Its landscape transitions between the Malnad and semi-Malnad transition zones with pleasant moderate weather and heavy seasonal Monsoon rains. It is 14km from Hassan city and sits on the banks of the Yagachi River flowing from Belur. The major crops grown in this region include coffee, arecanut, black pepper, ragi, paddy, maize and potato.

== Places of interest ==
- Shri Kenchāmba Temple: The temple is located in Harihalli village, Kechammana Hosakote, Hobli, Alur taluk. The Shrine is locally revered as a powerful Shakti seat, and often linked to the Saptamatrika(s) lore.
- Watehole dam and reservoir: Located on the Watehole river, a tributary of Yagachi River and it presents a beautiful look especially during the Monsoon season, It is 16km from Alur and 12km from Belur.
- Shri Vijaya Durga Kshetra: A collection of innovative temples of Shri Udasalamma and Mastalamma devis which are highly revered by locals, located in the village of Marasu, Alur.
- Parvatamma betta (hill): Parvatammana betta is an exceptional nature spot along with a historic temple and a popular destination for trekkers.

== Demography ==
As per 2011 census, Alur town has a population of 6,541. The total population of Aluk taluk is 85,255.

== Gallery ==
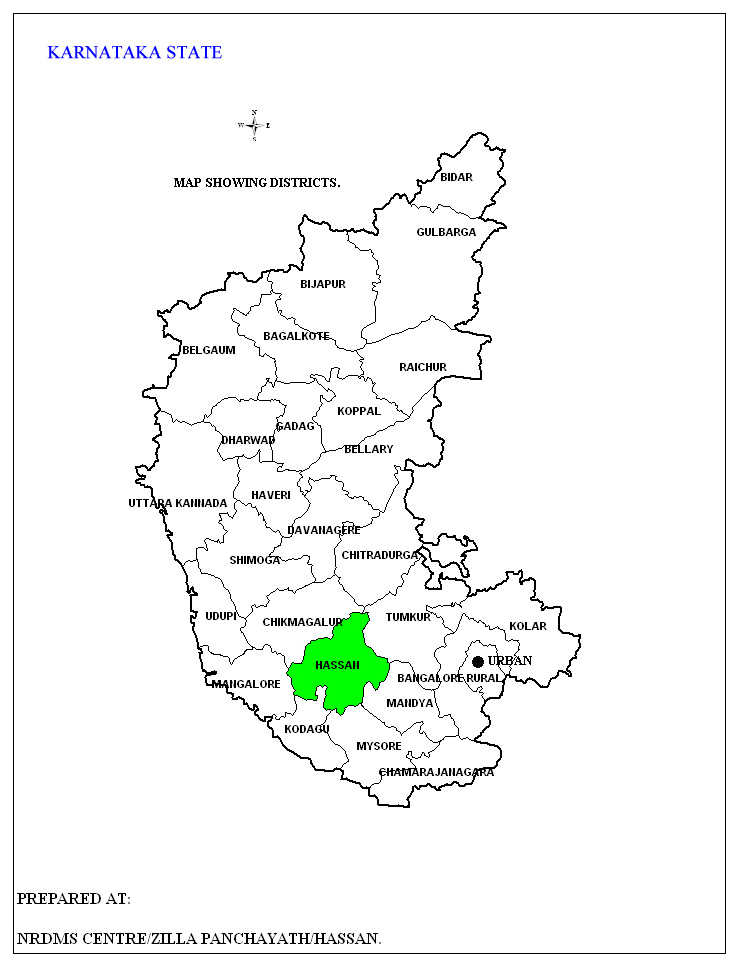
Positioning of Hassan district in Karnataka

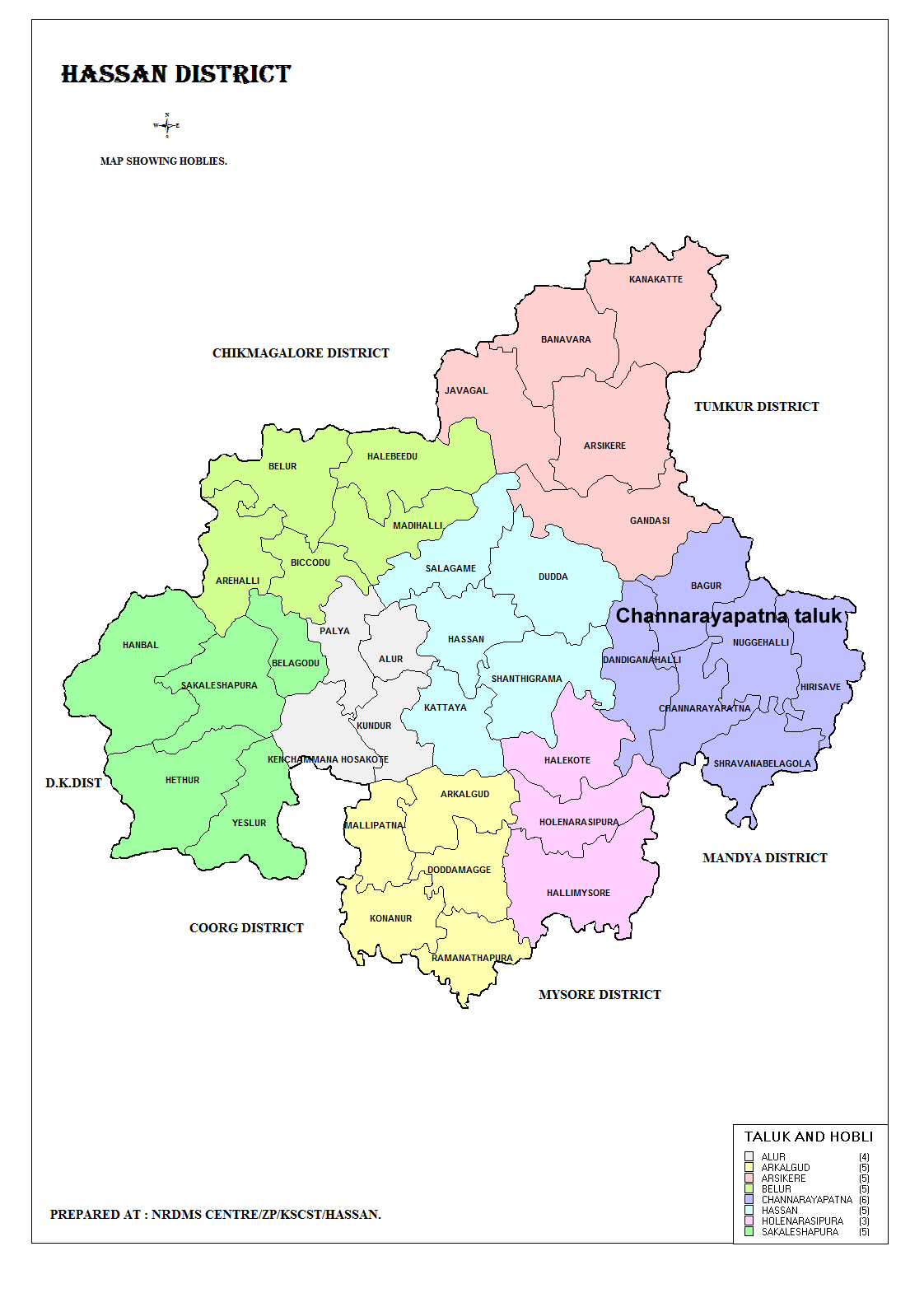
Hobli Map of Hassan district

Map of Alur Taluk as per 2001 Census

Map of Alur Taluk as per 2011 Census

Alur Taluk - Hobli and Village Map

Alur Taluk - Grama Panchayat and Village Map

Alur Taluk Map about Fluoride content in DWS

== See also ==
- Ajjenahalli, Alur
