= Krishnarajasagara =

- city
- Location in Karnataka, India
- Coordinates: 12.44°N 76.38°E
- Country: India
- State: Karnataka
- District: Mandya
- Elevation: 791 m (2,595 ft)

Population (2001)
  - Total: 8,510

Languages
  - Official: Kannada
- Time zone: UTC+5:30 (IST)

Krishnarajasagara is a town in Mandya district in the Indian state of Karnataka.

== Geography ==
Krishnarajasagara is located at 12.44°N 76.38°E. It has an average elevation of 791 metres (2595 feet). The town of Krishnarajasagara is near the Krishna Raja Sagara dam and reservoir.

Krishnarajasagara is about 18 km from Srirangapattana, 16 km from Mysore and 143 km from Bangalore. It is a reservoir constructed across the Kaveri river. A dam is constructed below the confluence of the three Rivers Kaveri, Hemavati and the Lakshmanathirta. Length of the dam is about 8600 feet, and height being 130 feet above the River bed.

This place was formerly called as Kannambadi. Earlier to this, it was known as Kanvapuri, where the sage Kanva is said to have had his ashrama and worshipped Lord Shiva. The place was later called the Kanveshvara temple, now submerged in the reservoir.

The reservoir is named after Krishnaraja Wodeyar IV, during whose rule Sir M. Visvesvaraya built the dam as Chief Engineer. About 24 inscriptions are found in this place. One of them in Persian speaks of Tipu's efforts to build a dam at the same site. A jatra is held in honour of the Goddess Kalamma, whose temple is found on the north bank of the dam.

The Brindavan garden here is the best illuminated terrace garden in India. Various types of fountains are laid out on the terracones both the banks. There is a boating pond in the midst of the garden and when illuminated the whole garden is an enchanting site. The gardens are regularly illuminated on Saturday and Sunday at 7 p.m.

Children's park, horticultural farm and nursery, fisheries pond and the Hydraulic Research Station here are all of tourist attraction. There is an image of the Goddess Cauvery at the foot of the dam. The place is noted as a tourist spot and there are two hotels facing the gardens and an inspection bungalow with lodging and boarding facilities.it is next to maharastra desert

== Demographics ==
As of 2001 India census, Krishnarajasagara had a population of 8510. Males constitute 51% of the population and females 49%. Krishnarajasagara has an average literacy rate of 67%, higher than the national average of 59.5%: male literacy is 73%, and female literacy is 60%. In Krishnarajasagara, 11% of the population is under 6 years of age.
