= Hassan, Karnataka =

Settlement in India

Hassan
- City
- Hāsana
- A signboard at Haasanaamba park, Hassan (2026)
- Interactive map of Hassan
- Location within India Location within Karnataka
- Coordinates: 13.003512°N 76.100339°E
- Country: India
- State: Karnataka
- District: Hassan
- Region: Semi-Malnad
- Established: 1886
- Founder: Channa Krishnappa Nayaka
- Named for: Hasanamba

Government
  - Body: City Municipal Corporation
  - MP: Shreyas M. Patel
  - MLA: Swaroop Prakash

Area
  - Total: 86.01 km^{2} (33.21 sq mi)
- Elevation: 950 m (3,120 ft)

Population (2025)^{+}
  - Total: 300,000
  - Density: 3,500/km^{2} (9,000/sq mi)
- Demonym: Haasanadavaru
- Time zone: UTC+5:30 (IST)
- PIN: 573201, 573202
- Telephone code: ISD 00918172 / STD CODE 08172
- ISO 3166 code: IN-KA
- Vehicle registration: KA-13
- Official language: Kannada
- Website: hassancity.mrc.gov.in

Hassan or Hāsana is a city, taluk and the district headquarter of Hassan district in the Karnataka state of India. It is a prominent city, located in the South-Western region of Karnataka and serves as a centre for agriculture, Heritage tourism and trade. It is known as the gateway to the important temple sites of Hoysala architecture.

== Etymology ==
Hassan city gets its name from the Hindu goddess Hasanamba Devi. As per Stalapurana the name 'Hassan' is an abridged form of 'Simhāsanapuri' or 'Simhāsanapura'.

== History ==
Hassan dates from beginnings of the Hoysala Empire in the 11th century. Hoysala Empire ruled this city for a long time and their influence can be seen in the art and inscriptions on the different monuments such as in Halebidu, Belur and Shravanabelagola.

== Geography ==
The city is situated 950 m (3,120 ft) above sea level. The urban population in 2011 was 133,436. It is situated at a distance of 182 km (113 mi) from the state capital, Bangalore, and 171 km (106 mi) from Mangalore. The western portion of the city is classified as Malenadu. The city is located on the leeward side of the Western Ghats which makes it the Rain shadow region, the eastern parts of the city is classified as Bayalu Seeme (plain-region). The city has some of the degraded forest ranges, and mountain ranges in the central and western portions such as Gende-katte deer forest, Seege gudda and mallappana betta. The Gorur dam is located near the city which was constructed across the Hemavati River in 1979.

=== Climate ===
Tropical savanna climates have monthly mean temperature above 18 °C (64 °F) in every month of the year and typically a pronounced dry season, with the driest month having precipitation less than 60 mm (2.36 in) of precipitation. According to the Köppen Climate Classification, Hassan has a tropical savanna climate (Aw).

Climate data for Hassan (1991–2020, extremes 1901–2020)
Month	Jan	Feb	Mar	Apr	May	Jun	Jul	Aug	Sep	Oct	Nov	Dec	Year
Record high °C (°F)	34.8 (94.6)	35.5 (95.9)	37.5 (99.5)	37.8 (100.0)	37.8 (100.0)	37.2 (99.0)	34.6 (94.3)	34.0 (93.2)	35.0 (95.0)	34.8 (94.6)	35.0 (95.0)	35.9 (96.6)	37.8 (100.0)
Mean daily maximum °C (°F)	28.8 (83.8)	30.8 (87.4)	33.0 (91.4)	33.3 (91.9)	31.9 (89.4)	28.2 (82.8)	26.5 (79.7)	26.3 (79.3)	27.6 (81.7)	28.6 (83.5)	28.3 (82.9)	28.5 (83.3)	29.3 (84.7)
Mean daily minimum °C (°F)	13.9 (57.0)	15.8 (60.4)	17.8 (64.0)	19.7 (67.5)	20.0 (68.0)	18.4 (65.1)	18.4 (65.1)	18.5 (65.3)	18.4 (65.1)	18.7 (65.7)	17.0 (62.6)	14.7 (58.5)	17.6 (63.7)
Record low °C (°F)	5.6 (42.1)	8.0 (46.4)	9.4 (48.9)	10.0 (50.0)	12.1 (53.8)	11.6 (52.9)	11.0 (51.8)	12.8 (55.0)	12.1 (53.8)	11.1 (52.0)	8.3 (46.9)	6.2 (43.2)	5.6 (42.1)
Average rainfall mm (inches)	1.1 (0.04)	3.5 (0.14)	13.7 (0.54)	69.2 (2.72)	103.2 (4.06)	109.6 (4.31)	141.5 (5.57)	115.6 (4.55)	111.8 (4.40)	168.6 (6.64)	44.1 (1.74)	6.0 (0.24)	887.7 (34.95)
Average rainy days	0.0	0.3	1.1	4.3	5.8	8.2	11.1	8.9	6.6	8.2	2.8	0.5	57.8
Average relative humidity (%) (at 17:30 IST)	55	48	50	57	67	78	82	83	80	77	71	62	68
Source: India Meteorological Department

=== Rainfall ===
In 2022, Hassan taluk received an annual rainfall (1 Jan – 31 Dec) of 1,316 millimetres (51.8 in).

== Transport ==
=== Air ===
There is no operational airport in the city. The nearest airport is Mysore airport and the nearest international airport is Kempegowda International Airport. Hassan Airport is an airport under construction 10 kilometres east of the city, near the Boovanahalli village. The project was first rejected by the State government in 2012. It was again revived in 2021 with a budget of Rs 175 crore and will be taken up by the UDAN scheme. Government of India has granted the approval for setting up of 15 Greenfield airports in the country on 12 May 2015. Among 15 airports Hassan was also approved for Greenfield Airport.

=== Road ===
The major highway passing through the city is NH-75 (Bangalore - Mangalore). Other highways include NH-373 (Bilikere - Belur)/SH-57, SH-21 and SH-71. The K.S.R.T.C operates buses connecting Hassan city and the district with other parts of Karnataka as well as cities of neighbouring states. Two divisions of KSRTC, Hassan and Chikmagalur, maintain a total of 9 bus depots (6 by Hassan division, rest 3 by Chikmagalur division) in the district, with two being in Hassan city alone.

=== Rail ===
Hassan comes under the South Western Railway zone of the Indian Railways. It lies on Mangalore-Hassan-Mysore line. Hassan Junction (HAS) connects the city to the rest of the country.

== Demographics ==
Religions in Hassan city (2011)
Religion	Percent
Hinduism	72.18%
Islam	24.19%
Christianity	2.04%
Jainism	1.31%
Other or not stated	0.56%

Languages of Hassan City
1. Kannada (68.2%)
2. Urdu (23.7%)
3. Telugu (2.11%)
4. Hindi (1.35%)
5. Marathi (1.28%)
6. Tamil (1.18%)
7. Malayalam (0.96%)
8. Others (1.20%)

As of the 2011 Indian census, the city of Hassan had an urban population of 177,484. Males were 49.5% of the population and females 50.5%. The average literacy rate was 80.8%. Male literacy was 82.7%, and female literacy was 78.9%. Of the population, 10.1% was under the age of 7.

In 2020, the Karnataka Government upgraded Hassan's city municipal council area to 66.12 km^{2} (25.53 sq mi) by including nearby villages to the panchayat and the population increased from 133,436 to 226,520.

In 2025, Karnataka Government upgraded Hassan city municipal council to Hassan municipal corporation expanded urban area to 86.01 km^{2} (33.21 sq mi) by including CMC area and neighbouring villages and the population grew from 226,520 to over 300,000.

== Economy ==
=== Industries ===
Hassan city is also an industrial hub in Karnataka. Major industries related to pharma, textiles, coffee, food processing sectors and also numerous MSMEs have set up their units in the KIADB Industrial Growth Centre, Hassan.

==== HPCL POL terminal ====
The terminal is located on 103 acres of land in Hassan industrial area. It supplies diesel, petrol and ethanol to retail outlets across 14 districts of Karnataka.

== Tourist attractions ==
- Hasanamba Temple: The temple is located in the heart of Hassan city, dedicated to Haasanaamba goddess. The uniqueness of this temple is that it will be opened only once a year, about a week, during Deepavali, it draws lakhs of pilgrims.
- Hemavathi dam and reservoir: The dam is located in Gorur, near Hassan city approximately 26 km distance from the city. Hemavathi dam presents beautiful look to the visitors, especially during the Monsoon season, when the spillway gates are opened.
- Shettihalli Rosary Church: The church is located 2km from Shetti Halli, Hassan. Built in the 1860s by the French missionaries, The church is a magnificent structure of Gothic architecture. It is also known as 'The Floating Church', after the construction of the Hemavathi reservoir in 1960 the church was submerged under the water due to the dam, it has since then become a tourist spot where people flock to see the submerged church during the Monsoon season.
- Mavanuru Sri Malleshwara Temple : Popularly known as 'The Windmill Temple', perched atop a hill surrounded by giant windmills. It is located in Bijemaranahalli 29km from Hassan city. It is also known as Mallappana Betta, Sri Bettada Malleshwara Gudi.
- GendeKatte Biodiversity Park : GendeKatte forest is a 308-acre eco-park and a mini-zoo located in Hassan, Karnataka, roughly 6km from the city centre. It features a walking track, eucalyptus trees, a rock garden, a population of wild deer, ducks, and peacocks.
- Bucesvara Temple, Koravangala: Bucheshwara Swamy Temple is an ancient Hoysala Temple located in Koravangala Village, 12km from Hassan city.
- Sri Ranganathaswamy Temple, Konapura: The distance from Hassan City to the Konapura is approximately 22.7 km, The temple is dedicated to the lord 'Sri Ranganatha Swamy'. Often it is described as Karnataka's "Secret Island Temple". It is surrounded by the backwaters of the Gorur dam (Hemavathi Reservoir).
- Hāluvāgilu/Hālubāgilu check-dam: It is a scenic, small check-dam built on the Yagachi stream which joins the Hemavathi Reservoir. The Haluvagilu village is approximately 8.2 km away from Hassan city. The Monsoon and the post- Monsoon months offer the best experience when the river is full, generates the signature "milky" aesthetic. During dry season there is little to no water flow. Haalubāgilu means 'milk door' in kannada, locally known as 'Haalubaagilu Katte' or 'Haalubaagilu thore'. The spot gets its name because, milky white foam sheet across the dam wall.
- Seege Gudda Sri Male Malleshwara swamy Temple: Sri Male Malleshwara sannidhi is a serene, hill-top Hindu temple dedicated to Lord Shiva, located in the Seege gudda Kavalu forest belt of the Hassan city. It is highly celebrated for its 39 - foot - tall Lord Shiva statue, a landscape dotted with giant windmills. The distance from Hassan town to Seege gudda is approximately 15.7 to 18 kms.
- Allalanatha (Varadaraja)Temple, Kondajji: Kondajji is a quiet village located approximately 18km from Hassan city, primarily known for the historical 14th century Allalanatha (Varadaraja) Temple, a temple dedicated to Lord Vishnu, it features a spectacular, intricately carved 14-18 foot monolithic black stone idol, widely revered by locals.

== Gallery ==
Hassan in 2026

Sri Hassanaamba Devi Jatra Mahotsav

District Court Complex

Hassanaamba park

Hassan KSRTC bus stand

=== Maps relating to Hassan ===
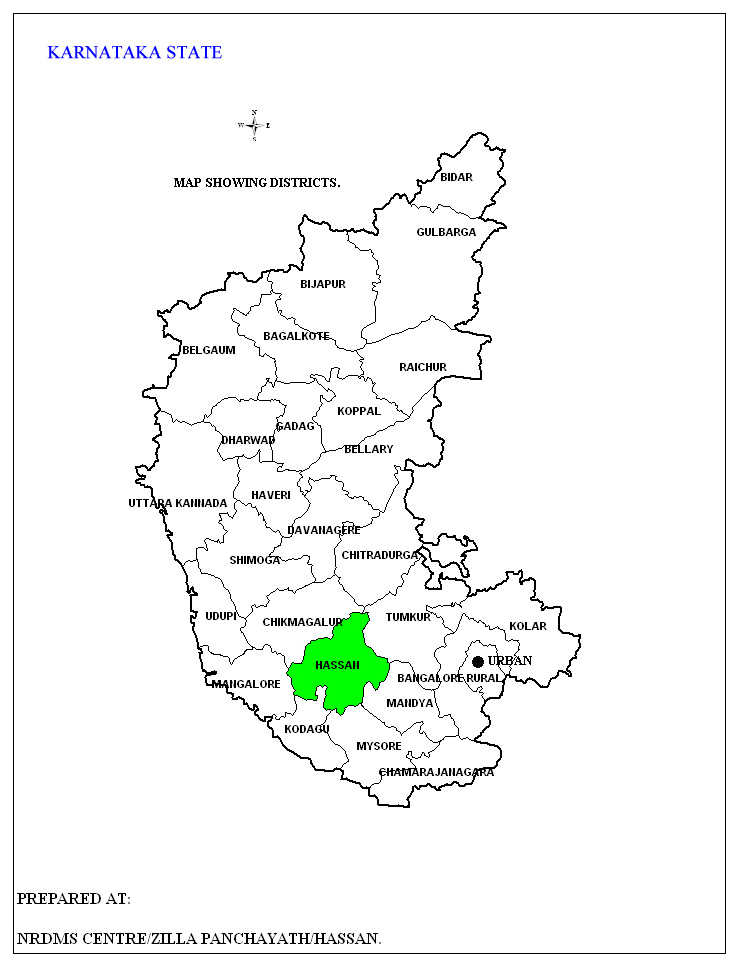
Positioning of Hassan district in Karnataka

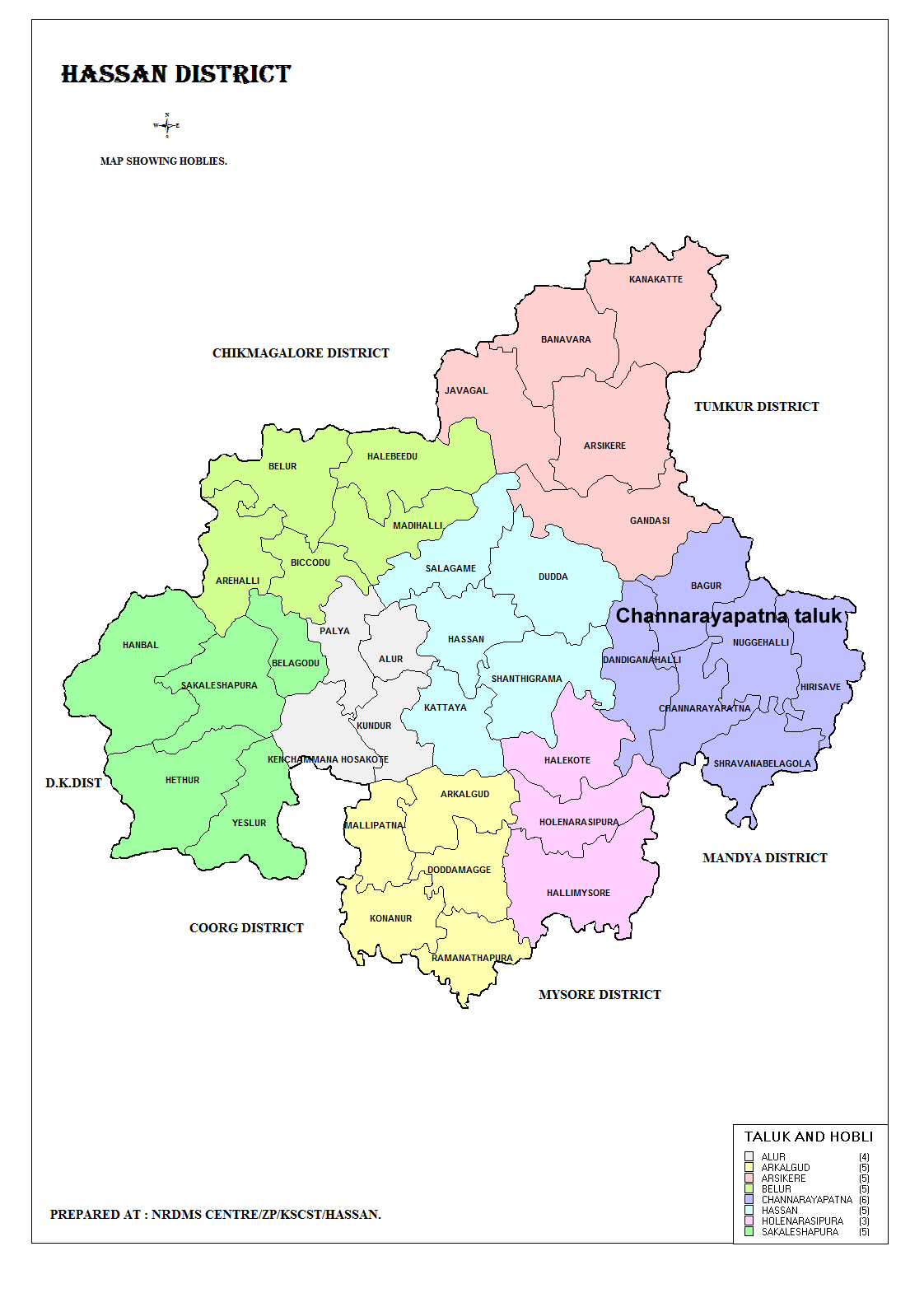
Hobli Map of Hassan district

Map of Hassan Taluk as per 2001 Census

Map of Hassan Taluk as per 2011 Census

Hassan Taluk - Hobli and Village Map

Hassan Taluk - Grama Panchayat and Village Map

Hassan Taluk Map about Fluoride content in DWS

== See also ==
- Hassan District
- Manjarabad Fort, a star fort from 1792
- Shravanabelagola
- Belur
- Sakleshpur
- Mangalore
- Halebidu
- Saligrama, Mysore
