= Sathenahalli =

Coordinates: 13.057344°N 76.339075°E

Sathenahally
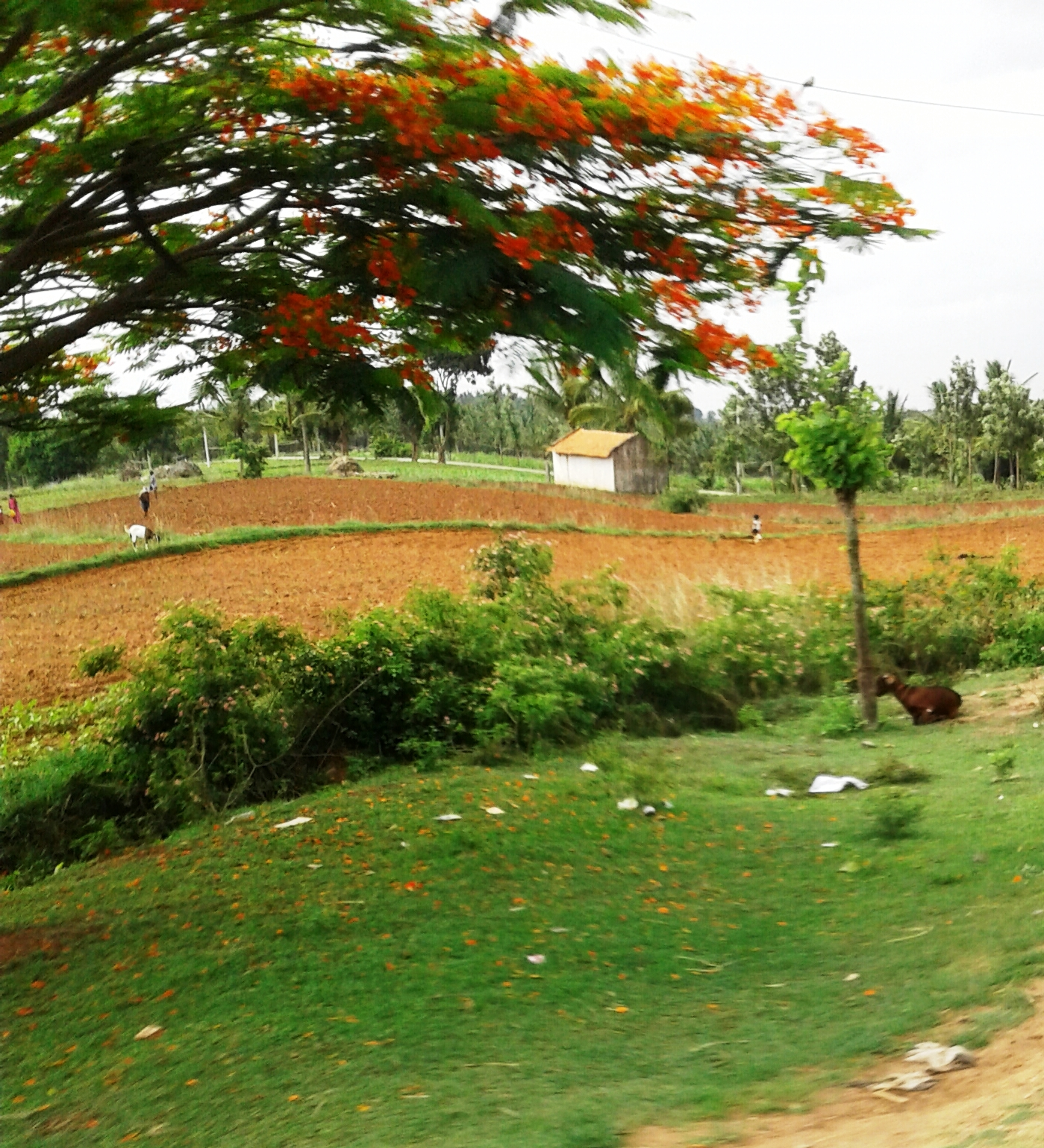
- Sathenahalli village
- Interactive map of Sathenahally

Sathenahalli is a small village in Hassan district of India.

== Location ==
Sathenahalli lies on the Mysore - Arsikere highway. It comes under Channarayapatna taluk of Hassan district in Karnataka state, India.

== Economy ==
The village is completely agrarian in nature. In 2015, the village recorded the highest rainfall in the region.

== Postal code ==
There is a post office in the village and the PIN code is 573212.

== Image gallery ==
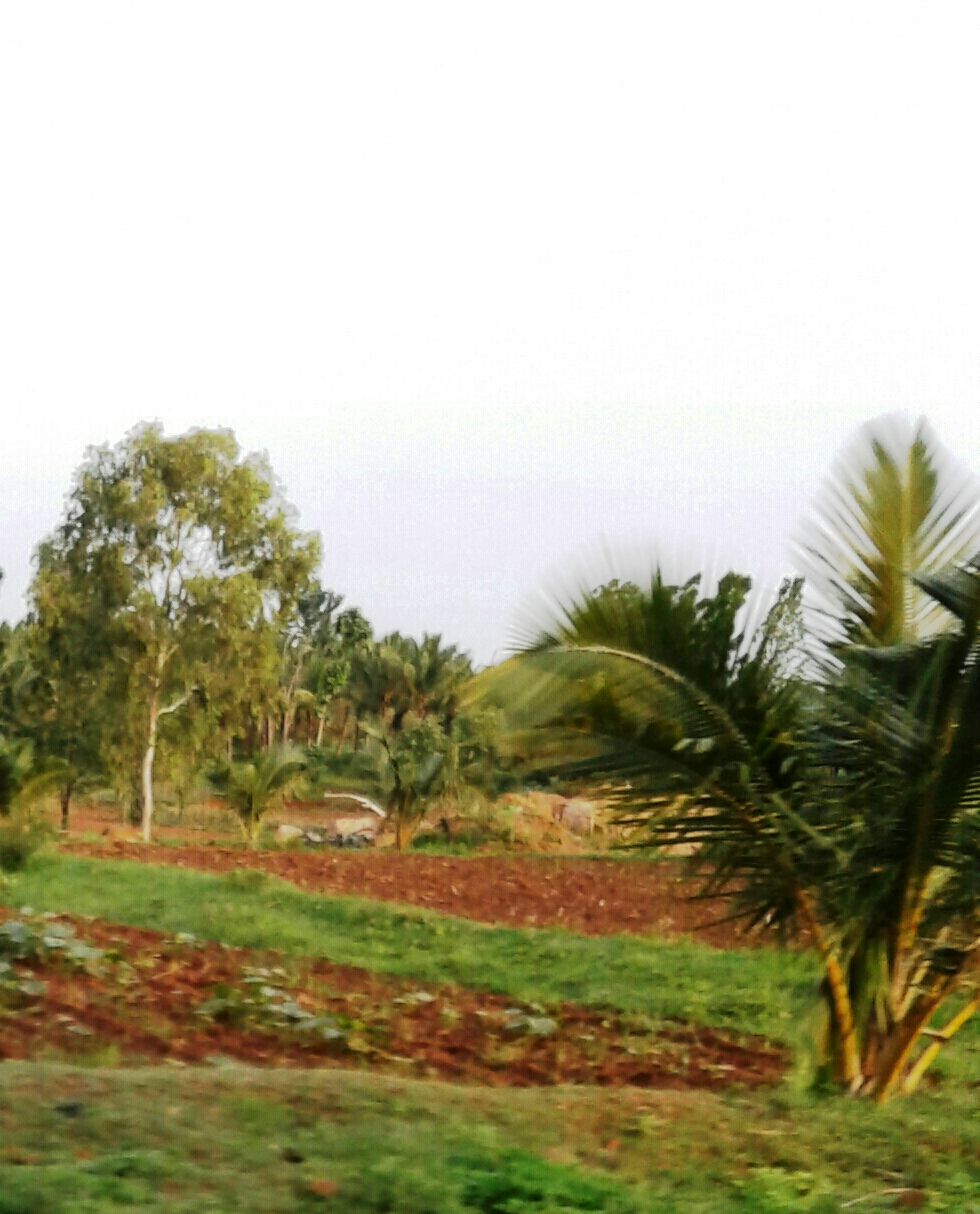
Sathenahalli

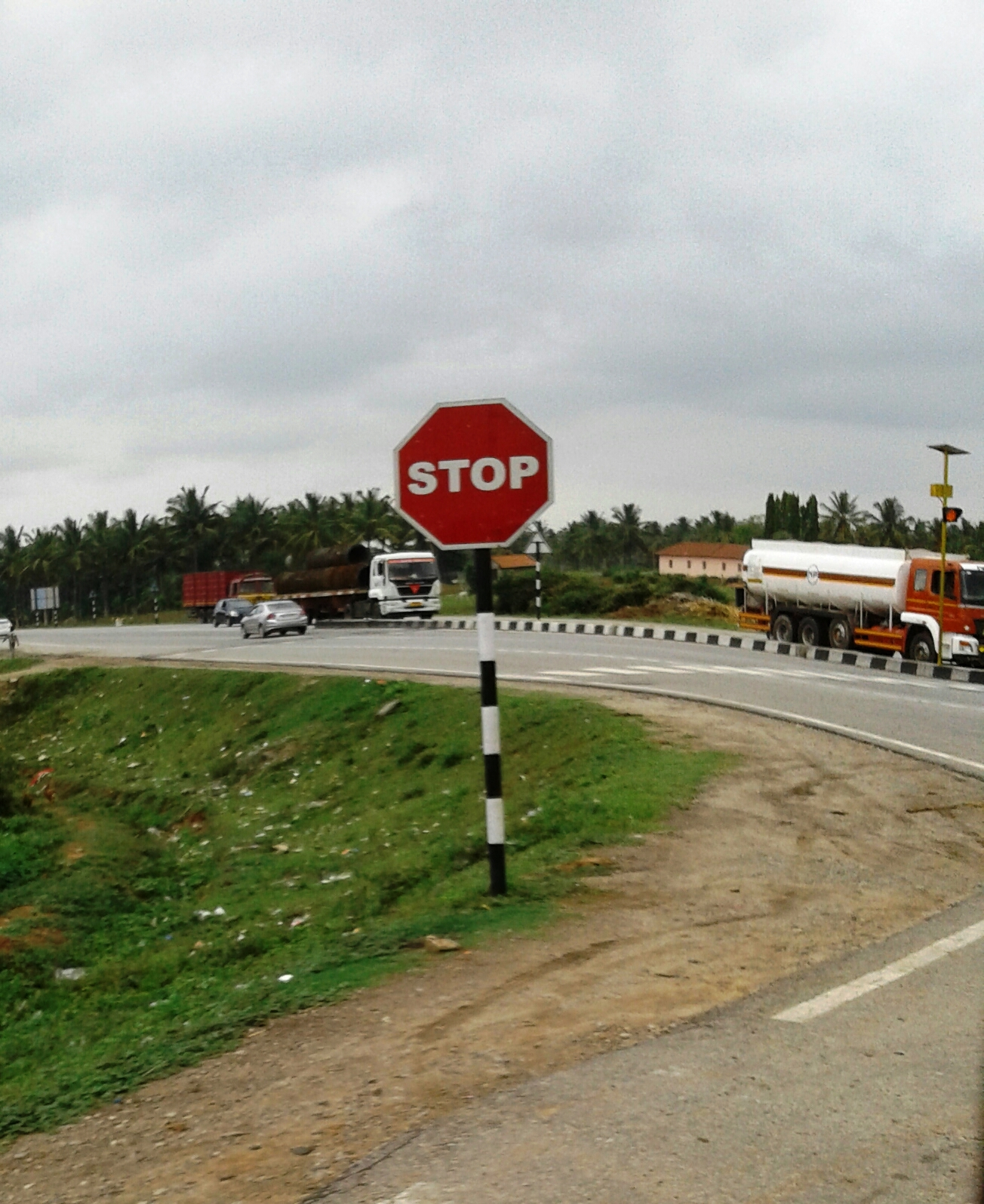
Highway Junction

== See also ==
- Shravanabelagola
- Shravaneri
- Munjenahalli
- Gandasi Handpost
- Mududi
