= Ajjanahalli =

Ajjanahalli may refer to:

== Places ==
- Ajjanahalli, Tirthahalli, a village in the Shimoga District of Karnataka State, India.
- Ajjanahalli, Arsikere, a village in Hassan, India
- Ajjanahalli, Turuvekere, a village in Tumkur, India
- Ajjanahalli, Magadi, a village in Bangalore Rural, India
- Ajjanahalli, Bangalore South, a village in Bangalore Urban, India
