= Mududi =

Village in Hassan, India

Coordinates: 13.206783°N 76.279793°E

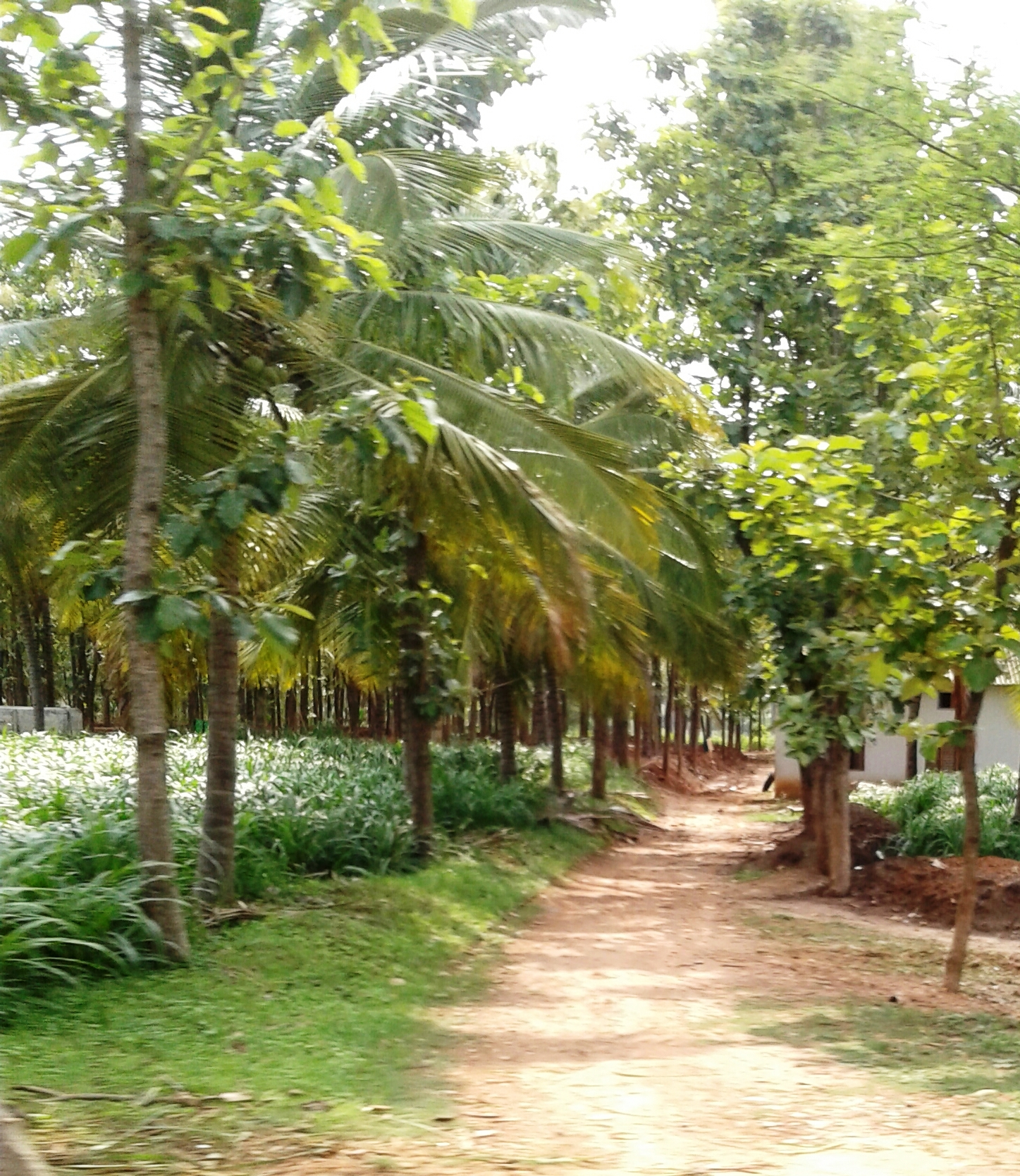
Mududi village

Mududi is a village in Arsikere taluk of Hassan district in India.

== Location ==
Mududi is located on the highway between Channarayapatna and Arsikere in Hassan district of Karnataka state in India.

== PIN code ==
There is a post office in Mududi and the postal code is 573119.

== Demographics ==
The total population of the village is 1,306.

== Image gallery ==
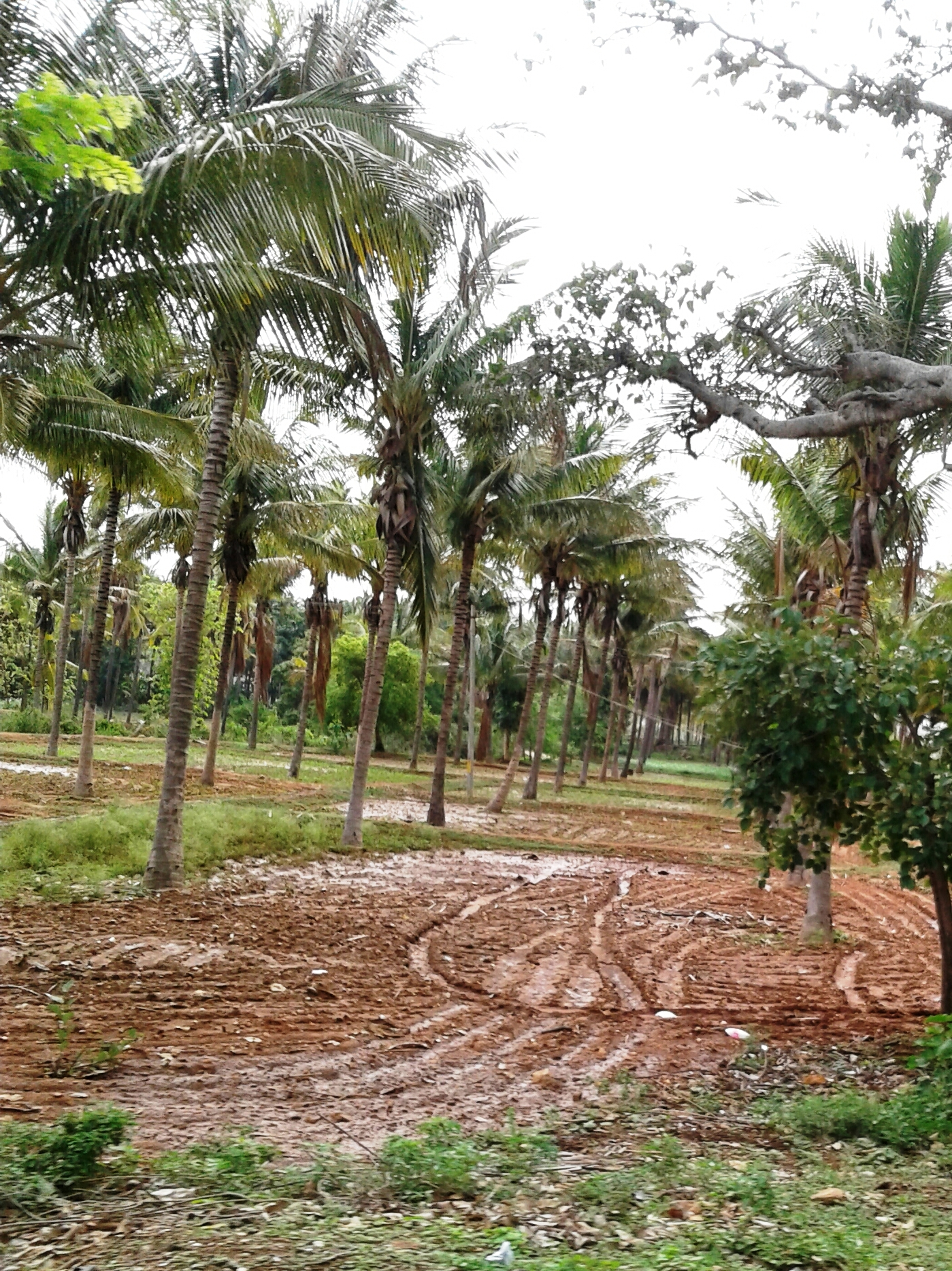
Mududi farm

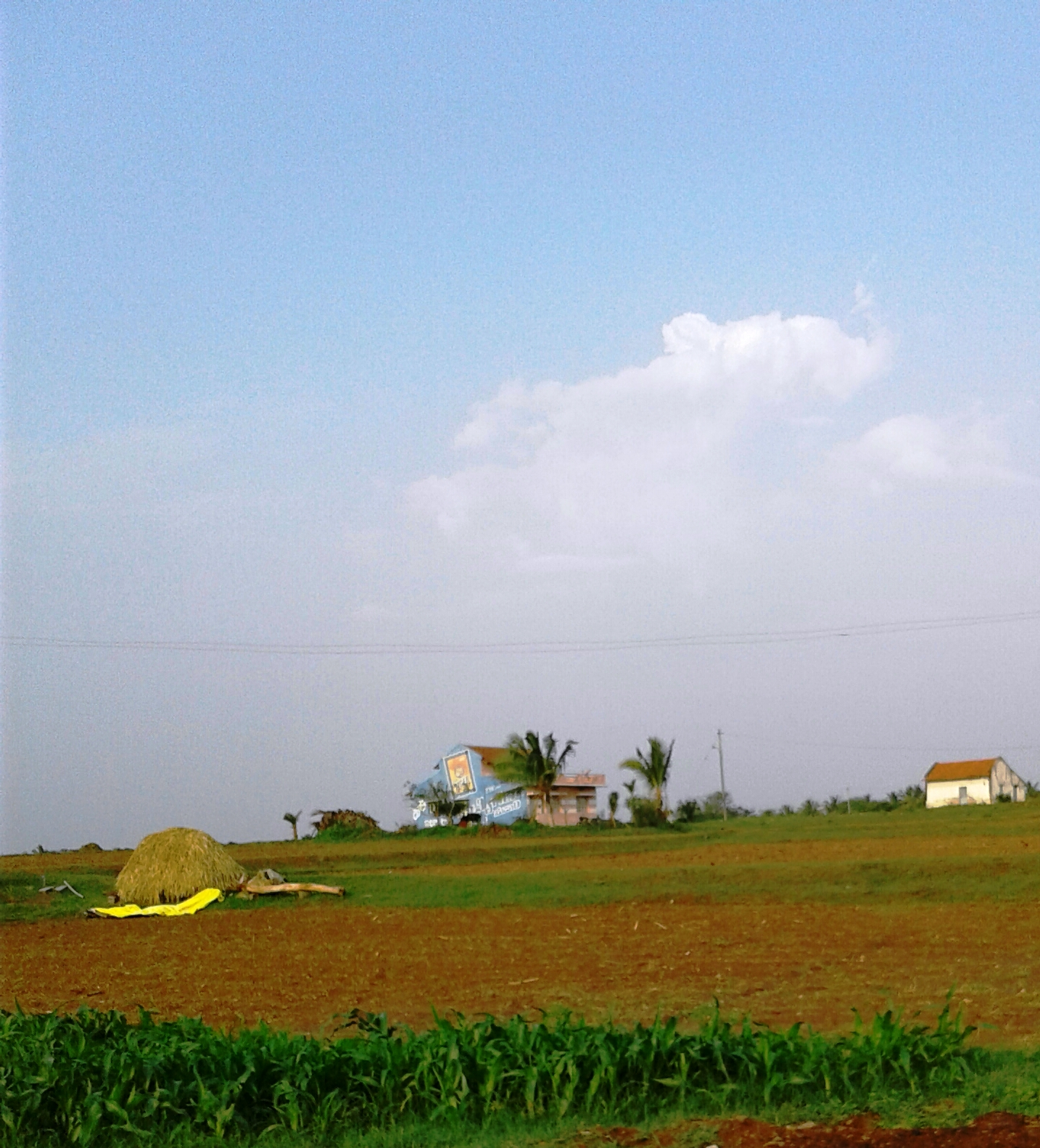
Gandasi Handpost

== See also ==
- Shravanabelagola
- Shravaneri
- Arsikere
- Channarayapatna
- Munjenahalli
- Gandasi Handpost
