= Kaggere =

Three separate villages in Karnataka, India

Kaggere is the name of three separate villages in southern Karnataka, in the south of India.

== Tumkur district ==
One Kaggere is in Tumkur district. It is located along NH 48, near by Yedeyur, Kaggere is the place where Shri Siddalingeshwara Swamy had performed penance (Thapasya) for 12 years.

== Hassan district ==
Another Kaggere is in Hassan District, Channarayapattana Taluck, this village has famous Shiva's temples "Kalleshwara" and "Gangadareshwara" temples. Kalleshwara temple hanuman temple is treated as one of the Panchalinga in Channarayapattana Taluck. The village has Shasana's, maha sathi kallu (memorial stones) and veergallu (hero stone).

== Mysore district ==
One more Kaggere village is in Mysore district, KR Nagara Taluck.
