= B.Cholenahalli, Shravanabelagola =

Village in Karnataka, India

Coordinates: 12.872115°N 76.462033°E

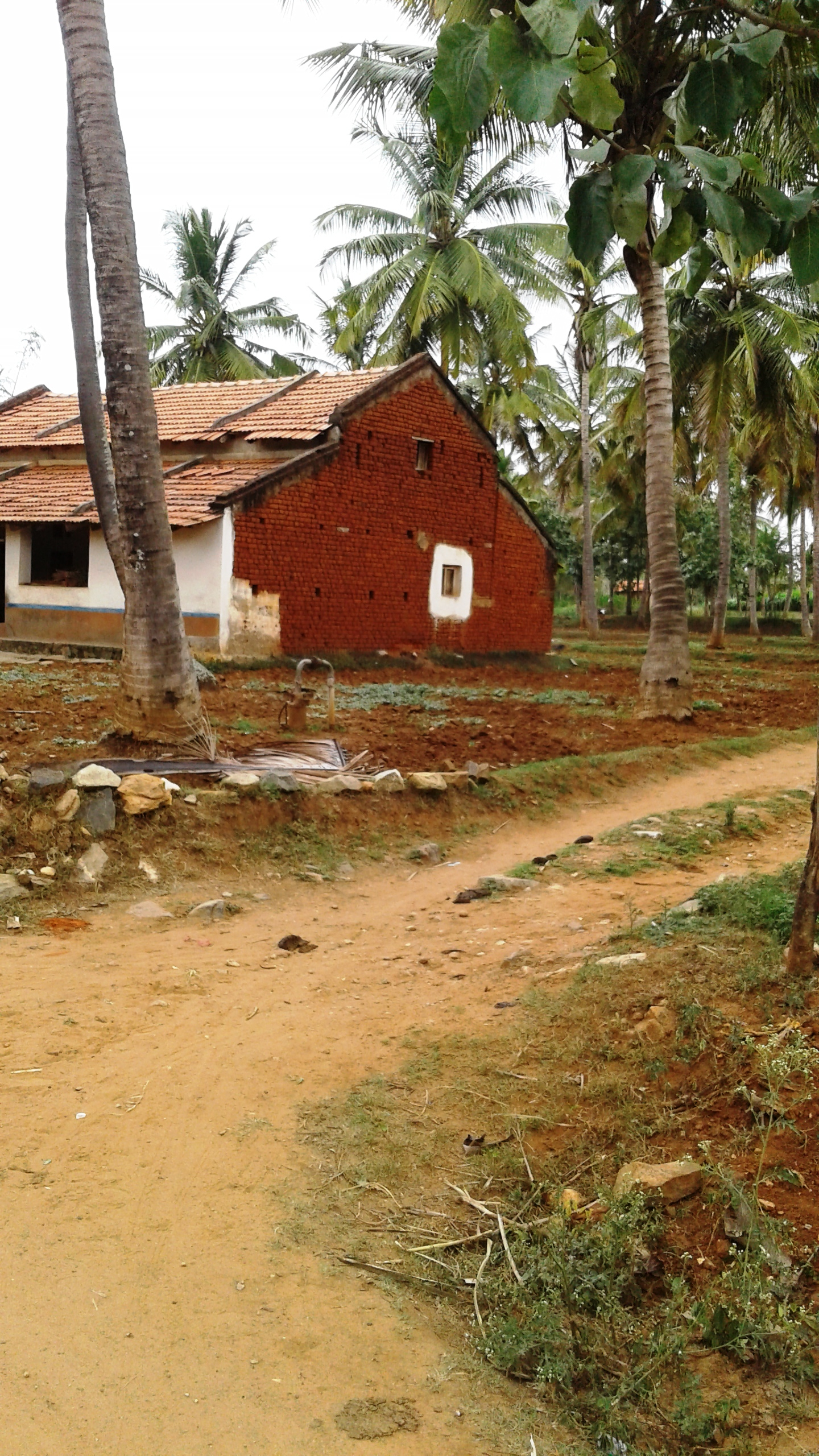
Cholenahalli Village

B.Cholenahalli is a small village in Hassan district of Karnataka state, India.

== Location ==
B.Cholenahalli is located 3 kilometres (1.9 mi) northwest of Shravanabelagola temple town, where there is a railway station. It is part of Channarayapatna tehsil.

== Postal code ==
The village has a post office and the postal code is 573116.

== Demographics ==
There are 1,036 people living in the village according to the latest census. There are 289 houses in the village.

== See also ==
- Kantharajapura
- Shravaneri
