= Kantharajapura =

Village in Karnataka, India

Coordinates: 12.845416°N 76.456961°E

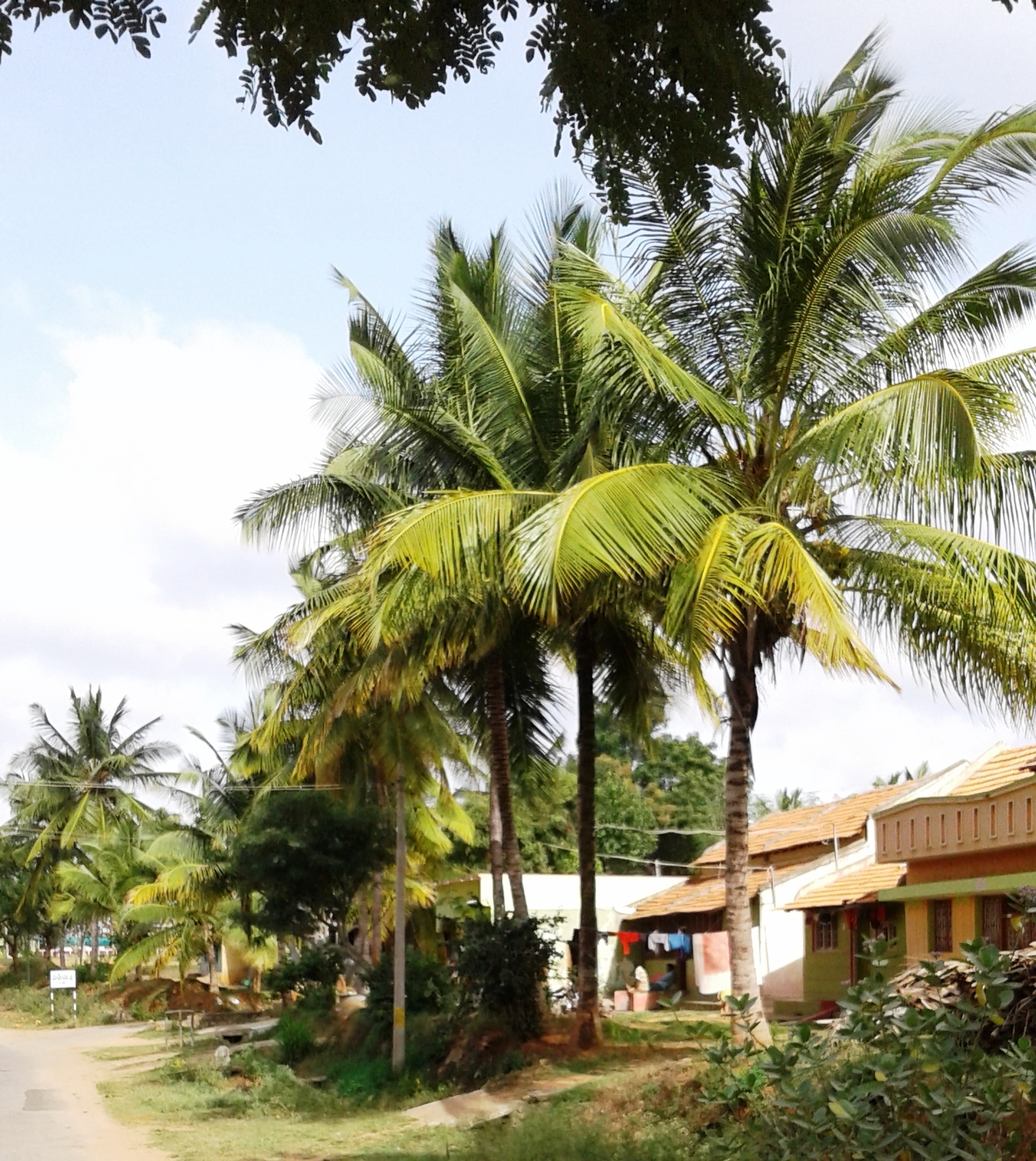
Kantharajapura

Kantharajapura is a village in Hassan district of Karnataka state, India.

== Location ==
Kantharajapura is located 2.9 km southwest of Shravanabelagola temple town.

== Tourist attractions ==
Lakshmi Narayana Devara Temple is located at Kantharajapura.

== Demographics ==
There are 1,175 people in the village, according to the latest census. They live in 300 houses. The total area of the village is 283 hectares. There is a post office in the village and the PIN code is 573124.

== Education ==
- Bahubali Engineering college
- Bahubali Nursing college
- Bahubali Polytechnic

== See also ==
- B.Cholenahalli
- Channarayapatna
- Shravanabelagola
- Shravaneri
