= Singarasa =

Singarasa was a local chieftain holding the title of Maha-Samantha (prince of a subjugated region), who had his headquarters at Arasikere, Hassan district, Karnataka, India, in the 12th century CE. He was a popular chieftain of his time, and several places in Karnataka are named after him, for example Singatagere (Arasikere taluk), Singanamane (Bhadravathi taluk), Singanagadde (N.R. Pura taluk) and Singasandra. Several chieftains with the same or similar names ruled various parts of Karnataka from the 10th century CE onwards.

== Mahasamantha ==
Singarasa ruled Arasiyakere (present-day Arasikere) when Vira Ganga Bittideva was king at Dorasamudra, the capital of the Hoysala Empire. Singarasa was the son (Note: As shown in the source) and successor of Nagavarma; Bhutarasa was Singarasa's son and successor.

== Relocated to Kanakatte ==
An inscription dated 1132 states that Singarasa was relocated from Arasikere to Kanakatte, where he built a temple named Bettadakalideva for Shiva by installing a linga. He also built another temple, which he named Singeshwara after himself, as was the prevailing practice.

== Bibliography ==
- Karnataka Historical Research Society (1987). The Karnatak Historical Review, Volume 21. Bangalore: Karnataka Historical Research Society.
- Gopal, Balakrishnan Raja (1982). Minor Dynasties of South India, Karnataka, Volume 1. Madras (Chennai): New Era Publications.
- Singh, Upinder (2008). A History of Ancient and Early Medieval India: From the Stone Age to the 12th Century. New Delhi: Pearson Education India. ISBN 9788131711200.
