= SH7 =

SH7 may refer to:

== United States ==
- Colorado State Highway 7
- Oklahoma State Highway 7
- Texas State Highway 7

== Other countries ==
- New Zealand State Highway 7
- State Highway 7 (Karnataka), India
- State Highway 7 (Rajasthan), a state highway in Rajasthan, India

== See also ==
- List of highways numbered 7
