= A. Kalenahalli =

- village
- Location in Karnataka, India A. Kalenahalli (India)
- Coordinates: 12°51′07″N 076°20′23″E
- Country: India
- State: Karnataka
- District: Hassan
- Talukas: Channarayapatna

Government
  - Body: Village Panchayat

Population (2001)
  - Total: 2,305

Languages
  - Official: Kannada
- Time zone: UTC+5:30 (IST)
- Nearest city: Hassan, India
- Civic agency: Village Panchayat

A. Kalenahalli is a village in the southern state of Karnataka, India. For revenue and land management purposes it is under Dandiganahalli Hobli, of Channarayapatna Taluka of Hassan District in Karnataka state; for other administrative and governmental purposes it is under Kumbenahalli gram panchayat of Channarayapatna Taluka.

== See also ==
- Hassan District
