= Arakere =

Arakere may refer to:

- Arakere, Arsikere, a village in Arsikere taluk, Hassan district, Karnataka, India
- Arakere, Shrirangapattana, a village in Shrirangapattana taluk, Mandya district, Karnataka, India

== See also ==
- Arekere, a neighbourhood in Bangalore, Karnataka, India
