= Shravanabelgola (Rural) =

- village
- Country: India
- State: Karnataka
- District: Hassan
- Talukas: Channarayapatna

Population (2001)
  - Total: 6,394

Languages
  - Official: Kannada
- Time zone: UTC+5:30 (IST)

Shravanabelgola (Rural) is a village in the southern state of Karnataka, India. It is located in the Channarayapatna taluk of Hassan district in Karnataka.

== Demographics ==
As of 2001 India census, Shravanabelgola (Rural) had a population of 6394 with 3309 males and 3085 females.

== See also ==
- Hassan
- Districts of Karnataka
