= Kanakatte =

Coordinates: 13°31′N 76°19′E

Kanakatte (Kanakaṭṭe), historically known as Kalikaṭṭi, is a village located in Arasikere taluk, Hassan district, Karnataka, India.

== Etymology ==
Kaṭṭe means an irrigation tank or bund in Kannada and the name of the village is related to the big tank built in this village.

Epigraphic records from the late 800s to the 1200s consistently referred to the village as Kalikaṭṭi.

== History ==
Kanakatte has an exceptionally well-documented history for an early medieval Indian village, with 12 inscriptions found in the village itself and another 3 referring to it found in other places. These inscriptions consistently refer to the village as Kalikaṭṭi. Its earliest documented mention is in a hero stone inscription from Arakere (in present-day Arasikere taluk), dated to 890 CE. The hero stone records the death in battle of Śrī Muttara, the governor (sāmanta) of Āsandi-nāḍu, and the posthumous grant to him of a vṛtti consisting of two villages: Arakere and Kalikaṭṭi. According to Brajadulal Chattopadhyaya, Kalikaṭṭi appears to have been less important than Arakere at the time.

The next record of Kalikaṭṭi comes exactly 240 years later, in an 1130 inscription recording the mahāsāmanta Siṅgarasa's installation of a deity (named Siṅgeśvara, after himself) and land grants for the upkeep of the corresponding temple. By this point, Kalikaṭṭi was being described as the foremost village (modalavāḍa) in the Magare 300 division. Exactly how Kalikaṭṭi had developed into a village of such importance is not known. Two years later, an 1132 inscription records that Siṅgarasa had been "lifted" from Arasikere, his previous base, and transferred to Kalikaṭṭi to govern it in person. Why Siṅgarasa had been transferred to Kalikaṭṭi is not known, but it seems to have been considered a significant event because it was mentioned again in a later inscription from the year 1189. Anyway, the 1132 inscription goes on to describe how Siṅgarasa had installed another deity in Kalikaṭṭi: this one was a liṅga called Beṭṭadakalideva (i.e. "Kalideva of the hills").

During this period, relatively early under Hoysaḷa rule, Kalikaṭṭi was referred to as an ur, i.e. a non-brahmadeya rural settlement. The effusive description of Kalikaṭṭi in the 1189 inscription is a panegyric one, describing it as "what an ideal rural settlement... was supposed to [be] like" rather than necessarily describing what the village was actually like at the time. "With well-filled beautiful tanks," it says, "with areca palms, with fields of gandhaśāli rice such as caused Lakṣmī of forests to open her eyes, and with fine temples, Kalikaṭṭi shone among notable settlements." Similar descriptions are common in other inscriptions from the time period.

A prominent local landmark during this period was an irrigation tank referred to as simply "the big tank" (hiriya-kere). Although its exact location is unknown, it is frequently mentioned in contemporary land grants as a point of reference for plots of land in the village. Of the 12 local inscriptions, 7 mention the big tank or its sluices. It was probably built before the Hoysaḷa period. It continued to be referred to as "the big tank" throughout this period, even after other tanks were constructed. Some of these tanks appear to have been privately owned, such as "Hariyoja's tank", mentioned in 1132; "Maṅgeya's tank", mentioned in 1208, 1209, and 1211; Boviti's tank, mentioned in 1208 or 1209; and Biṭṭeya's tank, mentioned in the same record as recently constructed.

By the early 1200s, Kalikaṭṭi's "agricultural space" was expanding to include several outlying hamlets (called hallis). For example, a new settlement called Biṭṭena-halli was established around 1208/9 by someone named Hoḍeya Biṭṭeya. At the same time, two new tanks were constructed and two new deities were installed (in Kalikaṭṭi). The village of Kalikaṭṭi along with its outlying hamlets had come to form a "settlement structure" that was referred to as Kalikaṭṭi-sthala — i.e. Kalikaṭṭi "locality" rather than "village". The term nāḍ is also used to refer to this agglomeration. Despite the introduction of these new terms, though, the basic ur remained the most common descriptor for Kalikaṭṭi throughout the period, indicating that local residents still basically considered Kalikaṭṭi to be a single, discrete village.

It was earlier called Kalikatte,"Kanakatti","Kanakanakaatte" etc. It was also mentioned in several inscriptions belonging to Hoysala dynasties and was also called as "Vijayanarasimha pura" after setting up an Agrahara during 13th Century CE. The name of this village, Kalikatti figures prominently in various inscriptions of Hoysalas, a strong regional power of South India.

Kanakatte was also a headquarters of Singarasa, a local chieftain ruling at Arasikere, who shifted his headquarters from Arasikere to this place during 1132 CE.

An inscription of 1189 CE describes the villages as prosperous with rice fields, areca palms, water filled tanks and full of temples.

The tank of Kanakatte is very large compared to contemporary tanks of the area. The tank has a large history and inscriptions belonging to historic period mention this tank as well as its sluices.

== Temples ==
Kanakatte has several historic temples, which are poorly maintained. The temples of this village have a long history, as several inscriptions belonging to 10th century CE to 12th century CE mention them. A local chieftain named Singarasa constructed a temple of Singeshwara (named after himself) during 1130 CE and donated lands to a Kalamukha priest to maintain Shiva temple. He also installed a linga in this village and named the temple as Bettadakalideva. Temples are also located on the banks of big tank and on a small island inside the tank.

== Activity ==
This is a predominantly dry area and crops with low water requirements are grown. Main economic activity of Kanakatte is agriculture. Ragi, jowar and coconut are main crops.

== Civic facilities ==
Kanakatte has a primary health centre run by the Government of Karnataka. Primary and high schools as well as a private college are established. A bank, police station and post office are located in the Hobli centre.

== Transportation ==
Kanakatte is connected by an all-weather road to Arasikere, Chitradurga, Bangalore, Hassan and other areas
