= State Highway 7 (Karnataka) =

State highway in Karnataka, India

State Highway 7

Route information
- Maintained by KPWD
- Length: 108 km (67 mi)

Major junctions
- South end: Srirangapatna, Mandya district
- North end: Arasikere, Hassan district

Location
- Country: India
- State: Karnataka
- Districts: Mandya, Hassan
- Primary destinations: Pandavapura, Krishnarajpet, Channarayapatna

Highway system
- Roads in India; Expressways; National; State; Asian; State Highways in Karnataka

Karnataka State Highway 7, commonly referred to as KA SH 7, is a state highway that runs north through Mandya and Hassan districts in the state of Karnataka. This state highway starts at Srirangapatna in Mandya district and ends at Arsikere in Hassan district. The primary destinations are Pandavapura, Krishnarajpet and Channarayapatna. The total length of the highway is 108 kilometres (67 mi).

== Route description ==
The route followed by this highway is Srirangapatna - Pandavapura - Krishnarajpet - Channarayapatna - Arasikere

== See also ==
- List of state highways in Karnataka
