= Munjenahalli =

Munjenahalli Manjenahalli
- Village
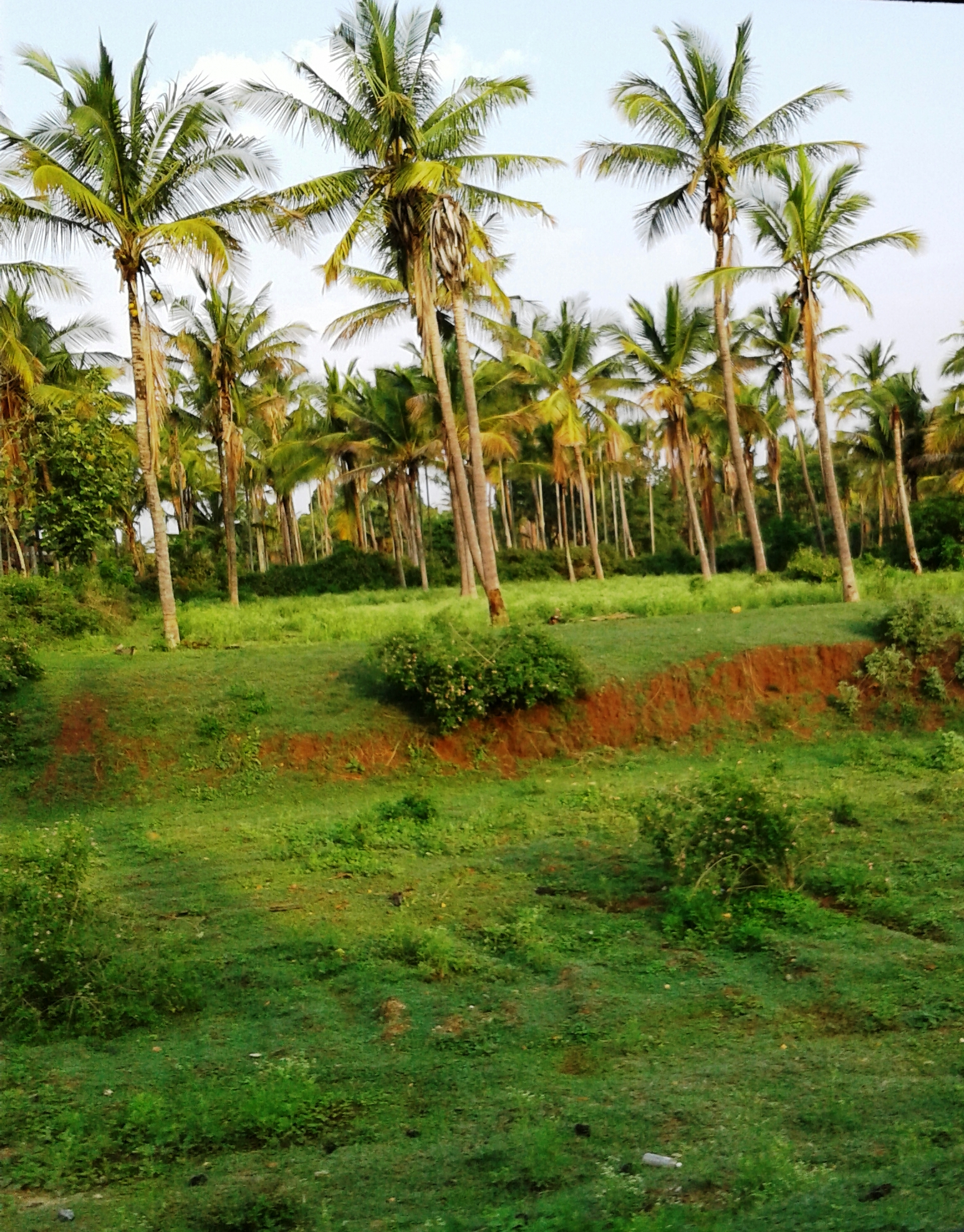
- Munjenahalli
- Country: India
- State: Karnataka
- District: Hassan
- Taluk: Arasikere

Population (2011)
  - Total: 487

Languages
  - Official: Kannada
- Time zone: UTC+5:30 (IST)
- Pin code: 573164
- Telephone code: 08172
- Vehicle registration: KA-13

Munjenahalli (Manjenahalli) is a small village in Arsikere taluk, Hassan district, in the Indian state of Karnataka. The village has population of 487 of which 238 are males and 249 are females as per Population Census 2011.

It is located 24 kilometers from Arsikere (taluk headquarters) and 32 kilometers from its district headquarters Hassan. Agriculture is the major occupation of the village, grows majorly Coconut, also variety of crops like Finger millet, Jawar, Tomato, Potato etc.

== Governing body ==
Manjenahalli is under the Grama Panchayat Chagachagere which is 2 kilometers from the village.

== Culture ==
Lakshmidevi and Chamundeshwari temple is the largest temple, also a village goddess and has huge number of devotees outside the village, apparently a crowded fair dedicated to Chamundeshwari takes place in the time of March Holi. Hanuman-anjuneya, Shiva- sree someshwara, sree Lakshmi devi, Mutturayaswamy and Plegalamma are also worshiped by people in the village notably. People of Manjenahalli believed that Devi Chamundeshwari is powerful goddess, on every pournami Amavasya evening a special worship takes place, where devotees from different places gather and get resolved their problems.

== Transportation ==
Nearest Bus station is Gandasi hand post from where direct buses are available to Hassan, Arasikere, Channarayapattana and Tiptur. Nearest railway station is Arasikere where trains are available to Bangalore, Mysore, Mumbai, Hyderabad and more key destinations.

== See also ==
- Arsikere
- Channarayapatna
- Gandasi Handpost
