= Bagur Navile Tunnel =

Water tunnel in India

Bāguru Navile Tunnel is the longest water tunnel in India. It was constructed between 1979 and 1990 and is located between the Bagur and Navile villages of Channarayapatna taluk of Hassan district, Karnataka.

== Length ==
The tunnel is 9.7 kilometers long and 75 to 200 feet deep under the ground. Water is supplied from Hemavathy basin to Shimsha basin using this tunnel. The estimated cost of this tunnel is 50 Crore.
