= Ajjanahalli, Bengaluru South =

Ajjanahalli
- village
- Location in Karnataka, India
- Coordinates: 12°55′02″N 77°23′12″E
- Country: India
- State: Karnataka
- District: Bengaluru
- Talukas: Bengaluru South

Government
  - Body: Village Panchayat

Languages
  - Official: Kannada
- Time zone: UTC+5:30 (IST)
- PIN: 562 130
- Nearest city: Bangalore
- Civic agency: Village Panchayat

Ajjanahalli, Bengaluru South is a village in the southern state of Karnataka, India. It is located in the Magadi taluk of Ramanagaram district in Karnataka.

== Demographics ==
As of 2011 India census, Ajjanahalli had a population of 2,541. Males constitute 1,270 of the population and females 1,271. Kannada is the official and most widely spoken language in Ajjanahalli. Ajjanahalli has an average literacy rate of 67 percent, higher than the national average of 59.5 percent, with 72.60 percent of the males and 61.40 percent of females literate.
