= Singanamane =

Coordinates: 13°43′N 75°38′E

- village
- Interactive map of Singanamane
- Country: India
- State: Karnataka
- District: Shimoga
- Talukas: Bhadravati

Population (2001)
  - Total: 7,640

Languages
  - Official: Kannada
- Time zone: UTC+5:30 (IST)

Singanamane is a village in the southern state of Karnataka, India. It is located in the Bhadravati taluk of Shimoga district in Karnataka.

== Demographics ==
As of 2001 India census, Singanamane had a population of 7640 with 3915 males and 3725 females.

== See also ==
- Shimoga
- Districts of Karnataka
