= Ajjanahalli, Turuvekere =

Ajjanahalli
- village
- Ajjanahalli, Turuvekere is in Tumkur district
- Interactive map of Ajjanahalli
- Coordinates: 13.757°N 76.713°E
- Country: India
- State: Karnataka
- District: Tumkur
- Talukas: Turuvekere

Government
  - Body: Village Panchayat

Languages
  - Official: Kannada
- Time zone: UTC+5:30 (IST)
- Nearest city: Tumkur
- Civic agency: Village Panchayat

Ajjanahalli, Turuvekere is a village in the southern state of Karnataka, India. It is located in the Turuvekere Tehsil of Tumakuru district in Karnataka.

== See also ==
- Tumkur
- List of districts of Karnataka
