= Arakere, Arsikere =

Arakere Village
- Village
- Location in Karnataka, India Arakere Village (India)
- Coordinates: 13°22′31″N 76°07′42″E
- Country: India
- State: Karnataka
- District: Hassan
- Talukas: Arsikere

Population (2001)
  - Total: 2,206

Languages
  - Official: Kannada
- Time zone: UTC+5:30 (IST)
- PIN: 573112
- Sex ratio: 1:0.95 (M:F) ♂/♀

Arakere is a village in Arsikere, Hassan District of India. It is located in the southern state of Karnataka state, India. Banavara is only 6 km to village too nearest town to Arakere village distance from its Taluk Main Town Arsikere Arakere is 41.1 km distance from its District Main City Hassan. And 165 km distance from its State Main City Bangalore.

== Demographics ==
As of the 2011 India census, Arakere had a population of 2,235 with 1,131 males and 1,104 females spread over 560 households.
