= Gandasi =

Village in Karnataka, India

- Hobli
- Gandasi
- Location in Karnataka, India
- Coordinates: 13.159393°N 76.305024°E
- Country: India
- State: Karnataka
- District: Hassan
- Taluk: Arsikere

Government
  - Body: Grama Panchayath

Area
  - Total: 6.58 km^{2} (2.54 sq mi)
- Elevation: 930 m (3,050 ft)

Population (2011)
  - Total: 3,729
  - Density: 567/km^{2} (1,470/sq mi)

Languages
  - Official: Kannada
- Time zone: UTC+5:30 (IST)
- PIN: 573119
- Vehicle registration: KA-13

Gandasi is a hobli in Hassan district of India. As per census survey of India 2011, the location code number of Gandasi is 615799.

== Location ==
Gandasi hobli (Taluk division) is located in Arsikere Taluk of Hassan district, Karnataka state, India. The village is located on State Highway 7 between Mysuru and Arsikere.

== Postal code ==
There is a post office in Gandasi and the postal code is 573119.

== Image gallery ==
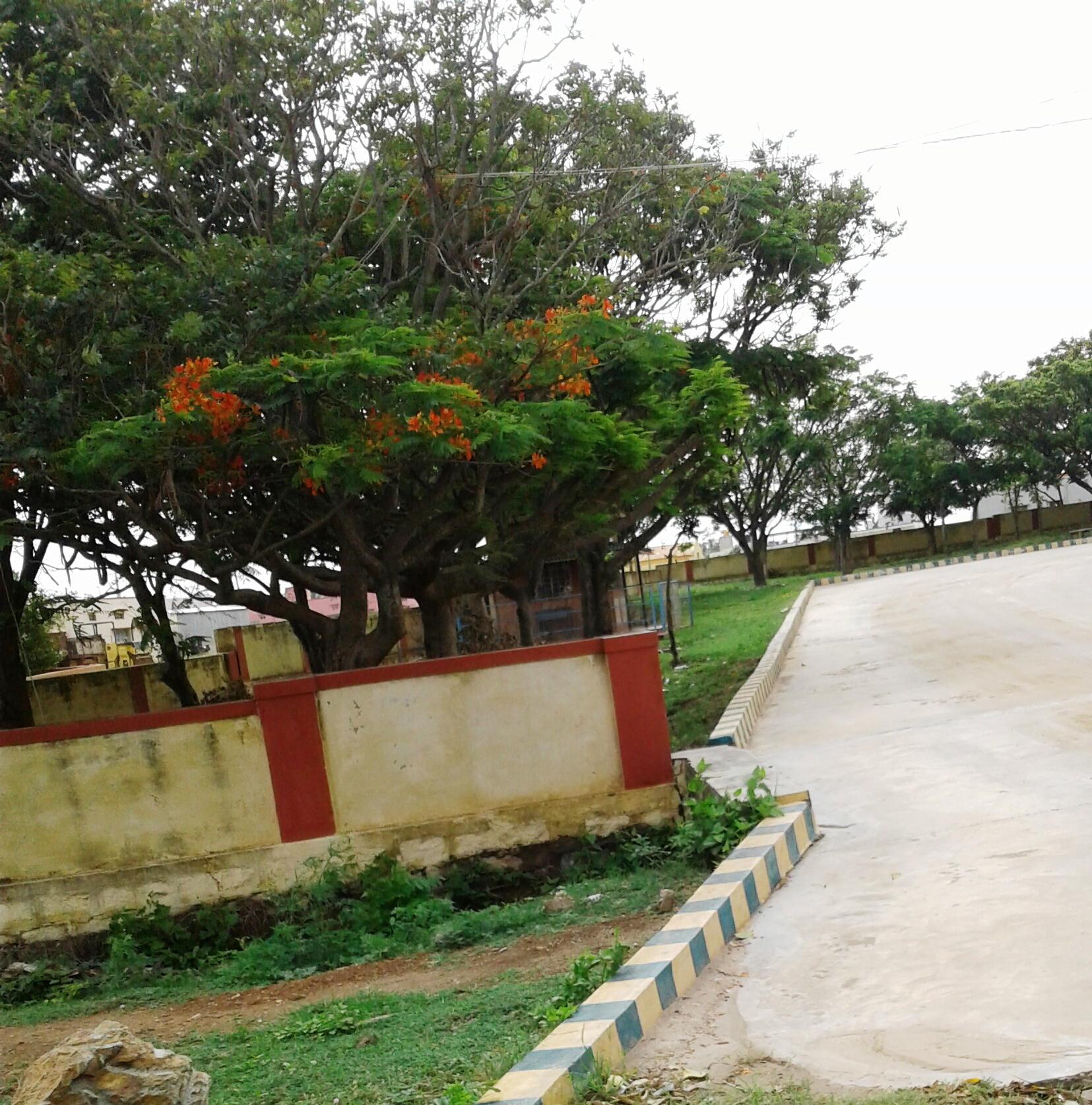
Bus Station

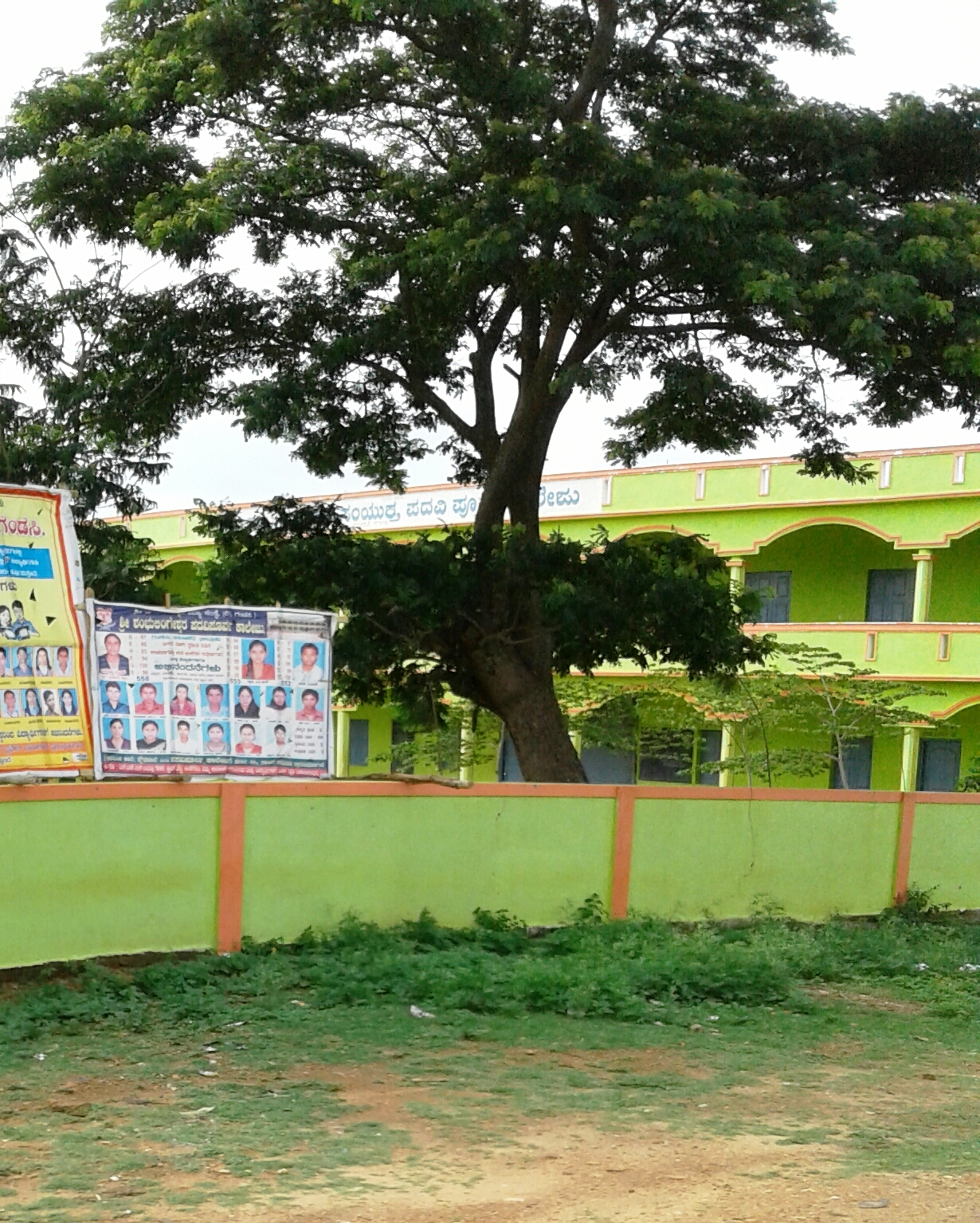
School

== See also ==
- Arsikere
- Channarayapatna
