= Shravaneri =

Coordinates: 12.873599°N 76.430205°E

Shravaneri is a village in Hassan district of Karnataka state, India.

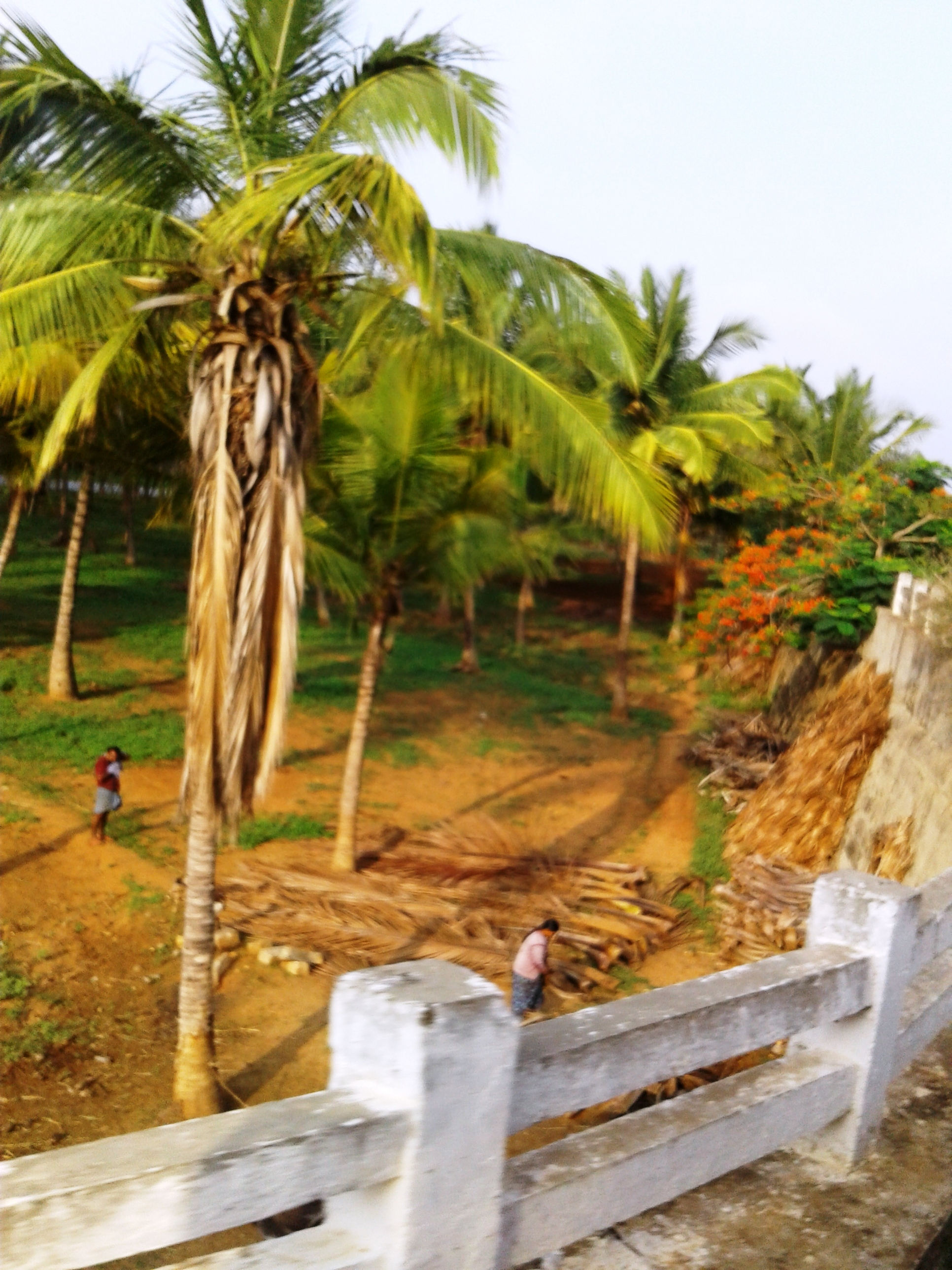
Shravaneri Village

== Location ==
Shravaneri is located 5 kilometres (3.1 mi) southeast of Channarayapatna town in Hassan district. The village lies between Channarayapatna and Shravanabelagola.

== Education ==
Government Higher Primary School, has grades up to 8th.

== Demographics ==
There are 840 people in Shravaneri living in 220 houses.

== Postal code ==
There is a post office in Shravaneri and the postal code is 573135.

== See also ==
- B.Cholenahalli
- Kantharajapura
