= Arsikere =

City in Karnataka, India

Arsikere Arasikere
- City
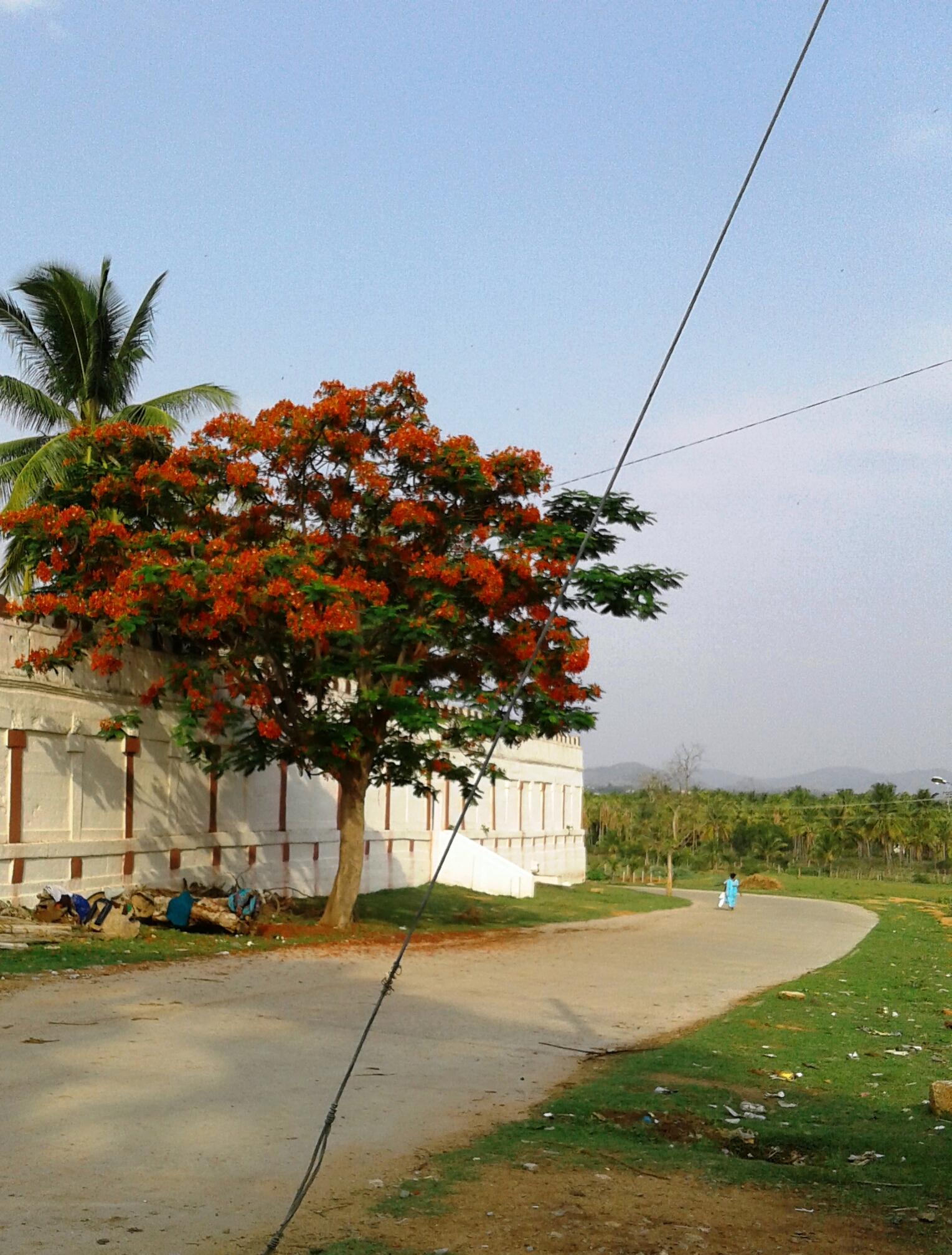
- Arsikere
- Nicknames: Arasiya-kere, Siddara Nadu, Kalpataru Nadu
- Location in Karnataka, India
- Coordinates: 13.3139°N 76.2369°E
- Country: India
- State: Karnataka
- District: Hassan
- Region: AreMalenadu
- Established: 12th century
- Founder: Queen Arasi of hoysala empire

Government
  - Type: Government of Karnataka
  - Body: City Municipal Council
  - Constituency: (Arsikere Assembly constituency)
  - MLA: K. M. Shivalinge Gowda

Area
  - City: 12 km^{2} (4.6 sq mi)
  - Rural: 1,257.75 km^{2} (485.62 sq mi)
  - Rank: 2nd in Hassan
- Elevation: 806 m (2,644 ft)

Population (2011)
  - City: 53,216
  - Density: 4,400/km^{2} (11,000/sq mi)
  - Rural: 315,339
- Demonym: Arsikerians

Languages
  - Official: Kannada
- Time zone: UTC+5:30 (IST)
- PIN: 573103, 573122
- Area code: 08174
- Geocode: ASK
- Vehicle registration: KA-13
- Website: http://arasikerecity.mrc.gov.in/

Arasikere is a city and taluka in the Hassan district in the state of Karnataka, India. Arsikere also called as Siddara Nadu. It is the second largest city in Hassan district, demographically. Arsikere city municipal council consists of 35 wards. This region is known for its coconut production and is also called as Kalpataru Nadu. Arsikere Junction is a major railway junction in the South Western Railway which links Mangalore, Bangalore and Mysore to North Karnataka and a central place for tourists who visit nearby places that do not have rail access, such as Belur, Halebidu and Shravanabelagola, Harnahalli, and Kodimata.

== History ==
The name Arasikere originates from one of the princesses of the Hoysala dynasty, who built a lake (kere in Kannada) near the town. Arasi means queen in Kannada. Therefore, it is 'Arasiya+kere' which means "queen's pond". Arasikere was also called Udbhava Sarvagna Vijaya and Ballālapura at various times.

Under the rulers of Vijayanagara, it was under the administrative control of Immadi Jagadevaraya of Channapatna and later placed under Thimmappa Nayaka of Tarikere. It was finally under the rule of Shivappa Nayaka of Ikkeri and was acquired from Ikkeri rulers by the Mysore Wodeyars in 1690.

Under the rule of the Wodeyars of Mysore, the area suffered from the raids of the Marathas, and was subsequently turned over to the Marathas by the Wodeyars as security for the payment of tribute.

== Geography ==
Arsikere is located at 13°18′52″N 76°15′25″E. It has an average elevation of 812 metres (2,664 feet).

Arsikere is situated about 44 kilometres (27 miles) from Hassan and 166 kilometres (103 miles) from Bengaluru on National Highway 73.

Towards northeast of the city, there is a mountainous scrub forest, known as the Nagapuri Forest. Old temples are found in isolation. sloth bear and leopard population is the highlight of this forest. The elevation of the forest lies between 900 metres (3,000 ft) to 1,240 metres (4,070 ft) above mean sea level. In 2022, this forest together with other adjacent forests, totalling 100.88 km^{2} was declared as Arsikere Sloth Bear Wildlife Sanctuary. Arsikere acts as the gateway to the malnad regions such as Chikmagalur, Belur, Sakleshpur, Shimoga due to transport connectivity and the region is well known for its coconut production so it is often called as Kalpataru Nadu. The western portion of the taluk is classified Malenadu, the town is located on the leeward side of the Western Ghats and the eastern and central portions are classified as Bayalu Seeme (plain-Area). The northeast portions of the taluk are drained by the Hagari river (Vedavathi River) which is a tributary to Tungabhadra River, the stream drains the valley of Gange-mudi near Mududi village.

== Climate ==
The winter temperature averages between 14 °C (57 °F) and 26 °C (79 °F). Summer temperature average between 19 °C (66 °F) and 35 °C (95 °F).

== Education ==
Notable educational facilities in Arsikere include the following:

=== School's and colleges ===
- St Mary's High school
- Sri Adichunchanagiri English School, Higher primary school
- St marys school (Kannada medium)
- Govt Girls High School
- Sri Vasavi School
- Anubhava Mantapa (S.T.J)
- Rotary school

=== Colleges ===
- Sri Jagadguru Kodimutt PU College
- Adhichunchanagiri Science PU college
- Government Boys Junior College
- Hoysaleshwara pu college
- Al Ameen College
- Hoysaleshwara degree College
- Vivekananda BEd College
- Royal institute Of Commerce(Royal Degree College)
- Government Engineering College
- Government polytechnic college

== Transportation ==
Arsikere serves as a common point for people travelling from Bengaluru to Northwest Karnataka and for commuters from Mysuru towards all of Northern Karnataka. Thus, public transport buses of 3 branches of KSRTC can be found here. KSRTC also has a bus depot in Arasikere, operated under Chikkamagaluru division. Tumakuru-Shivamogga four-lane expressway, comprising parts of NH-73 (Tumkur-Banavar) & NH-69 (Banavar-Shivamogga) is under construction, as of Nov-2022.

Arsikere railway junction lies on Bangalore-Arsikere-Hubli line. It comes under the Mysore division of South Western Railway Zone and is a major railway junction between Bengaluru – Hubli, Bengaluru – Shivamogga, Mysuru – Shivamogga and also connects northern Karnataka to Mangalore Central railway station, via Hassan Junction. Trains typically stop here before heading to Hassan, Bangalore, Hubli, Mysuru and Mangalore.

Nearly 120+ trains stop here and is around 166 km from state capital Bengaluru. It has five trains starts from here to Bengaluru, Mysuru, Shivamogga and Hubballi. Around 30,000 people travel from Arsikere to other parts of Karnataka every day.

The nearest international airport is Kempegowda International Airport at 190 km. Other nearby international airport is Mangalore International Airport at 220 km. A domestic airport near Shivamogga is around 110 km away from Arsikere.

== Festivals ==
Various festivals are celebrated in Arasikere, including the following:

- Yadhapura "Sri Jenukallu Siddeshwara Swamy Jatramahotsava" is a big festival held every month during full moon day.
- Ganapathi Pendal (where a large Ganesha statue is displayed for about ninety days in Pendal), Ganapathi Chathurti, and Ganapathi Visarjana which has been celebrated from past 72(in 2017) years (where an idol of Ganesha is immersed into the lake near Arasikere). During these festivals, Sports, cultural, and spiritual activities are organized.
- Madalu "Sri Swarna Gowri JathraMahotsava" is the biggest festival in Arasikere Taluk which is held during Gowri - Ganesha festival.
- Undiganalu "Sri Kariyamma Devi Jatramahotsava" is the biggest festival in Arasikere taluk which is held in the month of April.
- Malekallu Thirupathi Fair takes place annually for the god Venkataramana and Govindaraja.

== Places of interest ==
Notable places around Arsikere include the following:

=== Temples and architecture ===
- The Kalameshwara Temple (also Ishwara), also known as Kattameshvara and Chandramoulishvara by devotees, is a monument in the Hoysala style of architecture. It faces east and dates to 1220 A.D.
- Sahasrakuta Jinalaya has a Hoysala building from 1220 A.D. and was constructed by Vasudhaika bandhava Recharasa, a minister of Veera Ballala II.
- Chikka Tirupati which is also called as Malekallu Tirupati or Amaragiri Malekallu Tirupati. It is located 3 km away from Arsikere, Hassan district. The main God worshipped here is Lord Balaji or Sri Venkataramana Swamy. There is a temple on the top of the hill which contains 1300 steps. There is a belief that sage Agasthya had offered prayers here to Lord Balaji and was blessed with lords Darshan here. It is also said that the sage Vashista lived here and went to atonement by worshipping Lord Venkataramana Swamy, and on the day of Shuddha Dwadashi Lord appeared and blessed him and hence this day every year a Maharathothsava will be held and is celebrated as one of the biggest festivals.
- Jenukallu Siddeshwara swamy hill
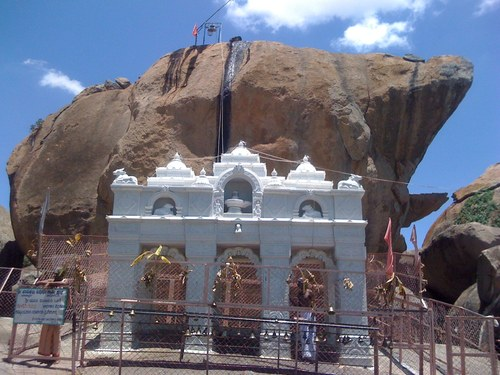
  Jenukallu siddeshwara Betta (hill)
- Arasikere is home to naturally built elephant stone, situated at heart of the town in Shri Subrahmanya Ane Betta.
- Sri Siddarameshwara Gadduge is located 12 kilometers from Arsikere, near Banavara.
- Sri Devamma Devi Devalaya T Kodihalli near Thalalur is located 10 kilometers from Arsikere city.
- Sri Veerabhadra Swami and Honaldajji Temple of Jajur is located 2 kilometers from Arsikere center.
- Shree shyla Mallikarjuna temple, Challapura is located 8 kilometers from trekking.

=== Others ===
- The Nagapuri fortress, built on the Hirekal hill, is eleven kilometres north of Arasikere and is said to have been constructed by Hyder Ali.

=== Nearby towns and places of interest ===
- Madalu Sri Swarna Gowri (also called as Madalu Gowramma) is a popular festival celebrated in a nearby town called Mādālu. This is celebrated during Gowri - the Ganesha festival.
- Undiganalu which is the village located in between Arasikere and Javagal there are historical temples called Kariyamma Devi Temple, Chamundeshwari Temple, Gavisiddeshwara temple (located in the hill top), Bhalu Basaveshwara Temple (located midway). There are many festivals in that the Kariyamma Devi Jathramahothsava is one of the popular festivals in Arasikere Taluk. Unidiganalu is located 28 km from Arasikere and 11 km from Javagal.
- Javagal, the hobli, is about 33 km from Arasikere and about 35 km from Hassan. It has Shri Lakshminarasimha Temple which is a well preserved specimen of Hoysala architecture with an outer entrance. The temple is attributed to the middle of the 13th century A.D.
- Haranahally is a large village about eight kilometres south of Arasikere; there are remains of an old fort that is said to have been erected in 1070 A.D. by a chief named Someshvara Raya. There is a large Nagarti tank, which was named after his daughter.
- Bannavara is a nearby town where one can see an old forts and a temple.

== Notable people ==
Notable people from Arsikere include:

- Balakrishna, actor
- David Johnson, cricketer
- Javagal Srinath, Indian cricketer and pace bowler
- Dhananjay (actor), Kannada actor
- Doddanna, Kannada actor
- Ashok Haranahalli, Former Advocate General to Govt. of Karnataka
- Haranahalli Ramaswamy, former irrigation minister and founding member of the Malnad Education Trust
- Channa Keshava Sharma, Freedom fighter and Tamra Pathra Awardee
- Narayana Gowda, Chief of Karnataka Rakshana Vedike
- Chandrika, actress
- Aparna, actress, Kannada anchor
- Rajanand, Kannada actor
- D Shankar Singh, producer/director

== Image gallery ==
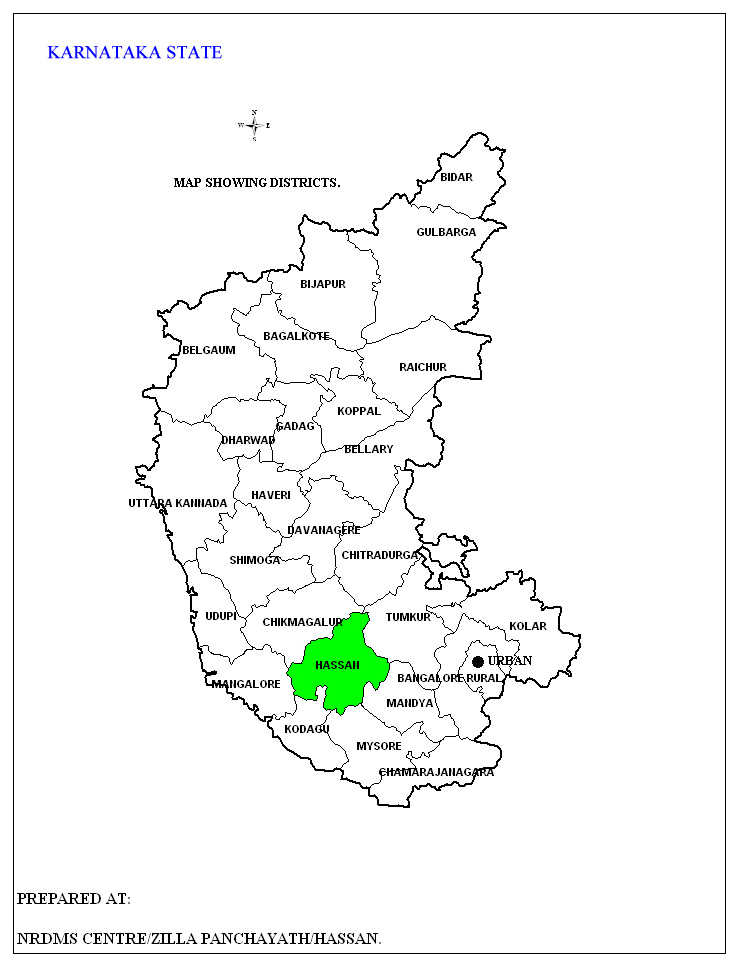
Positioning of Hassan district in Karnataka

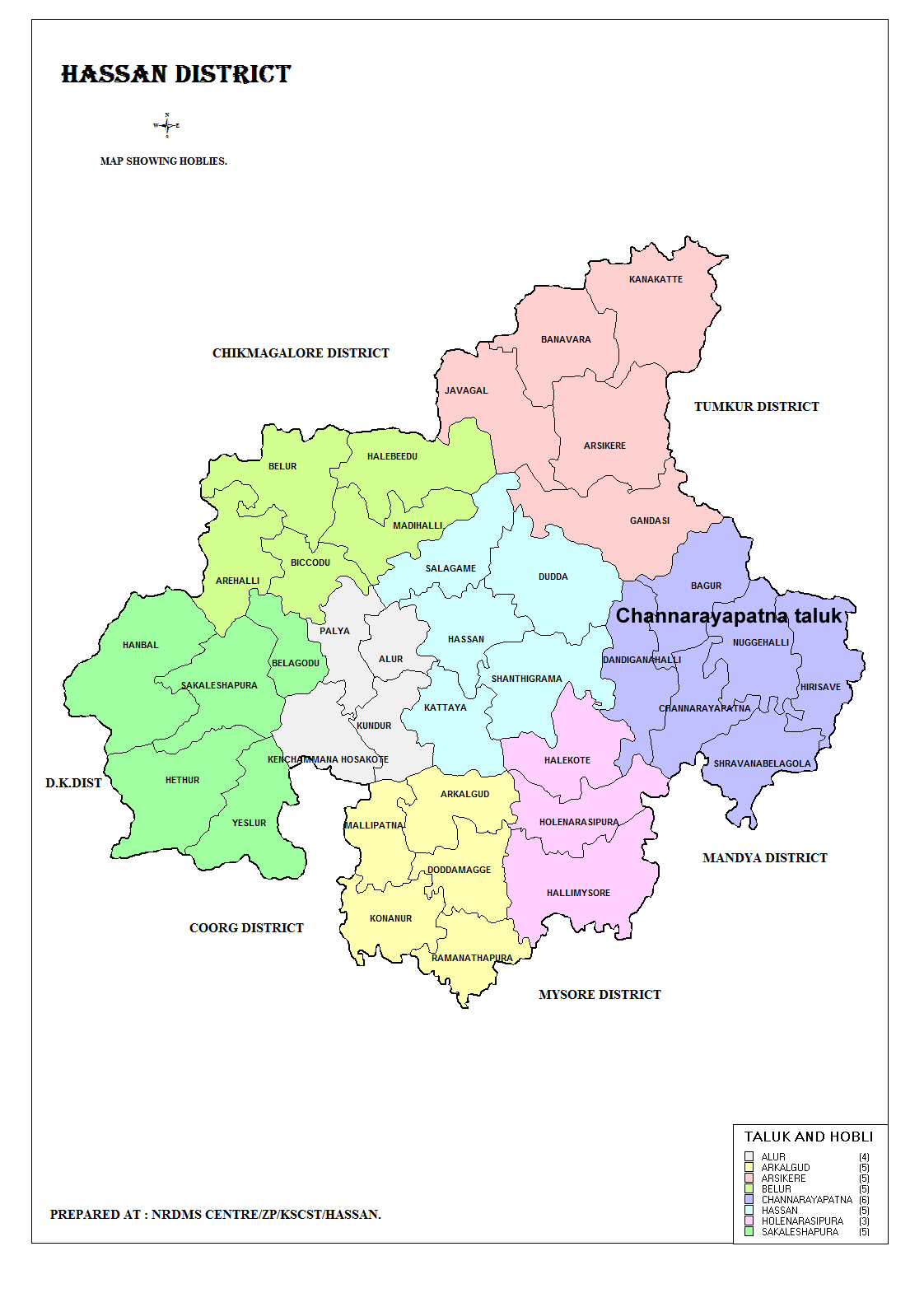
Hobli Map of Hassan district

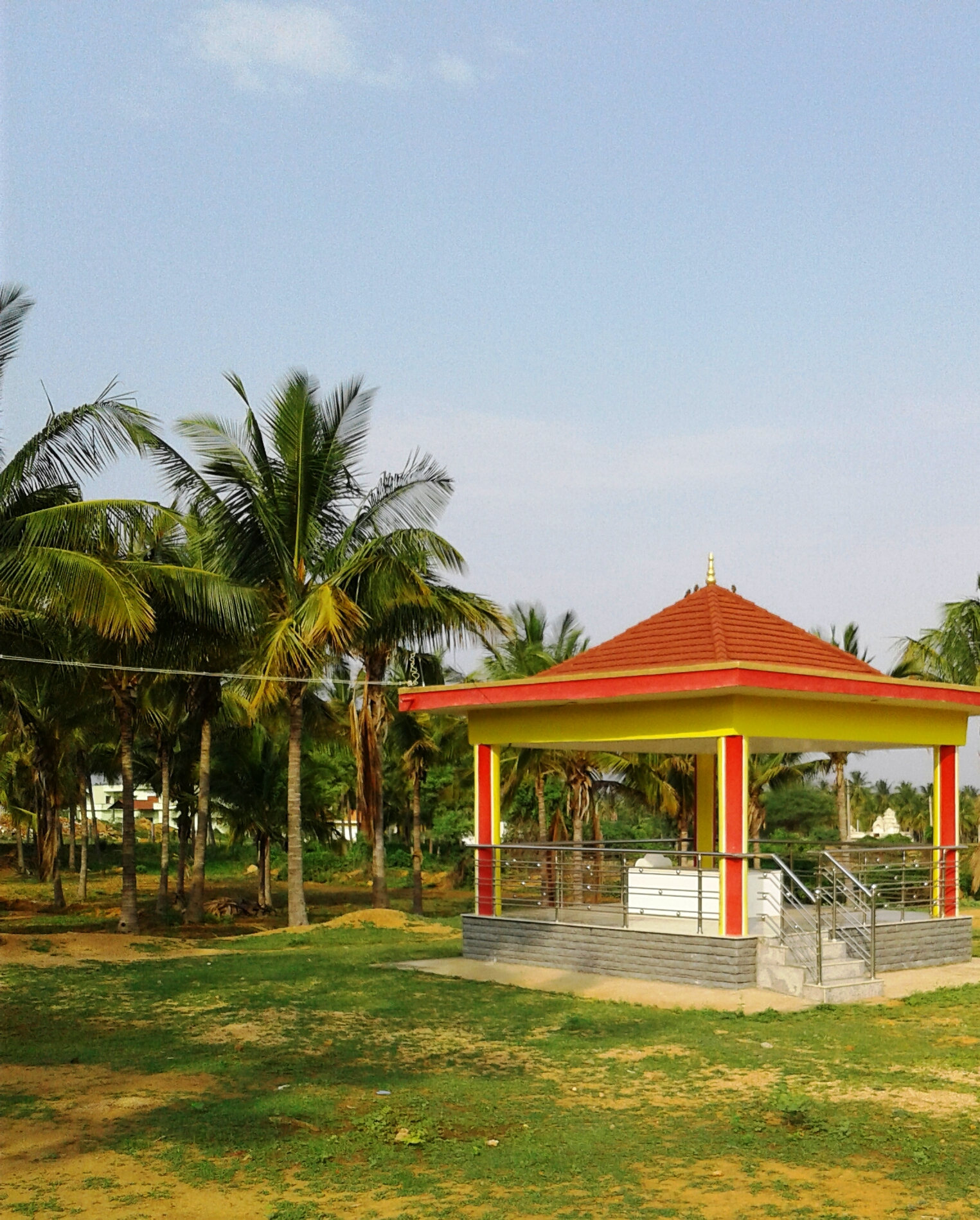
Malekallu Temple

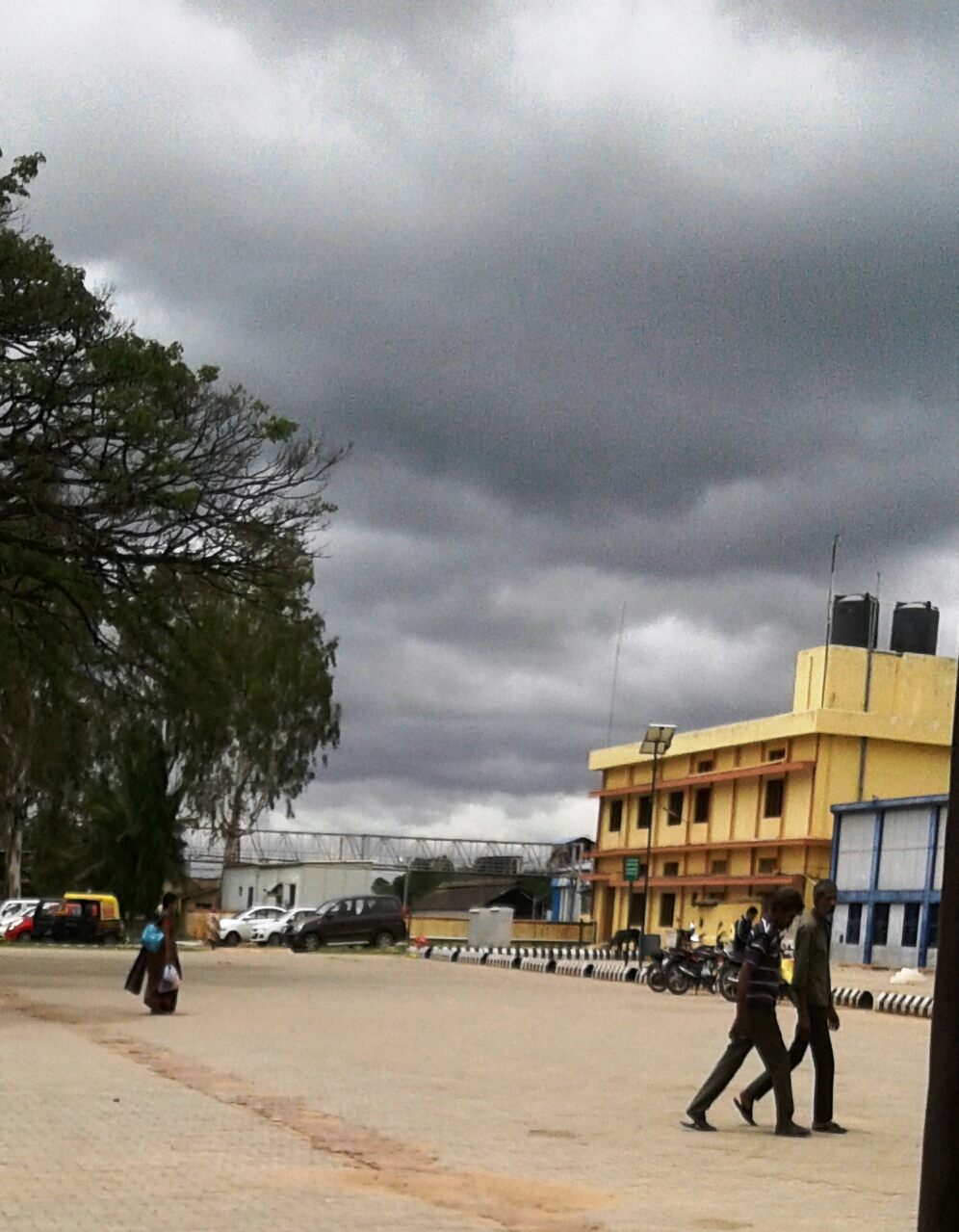
Railway Station

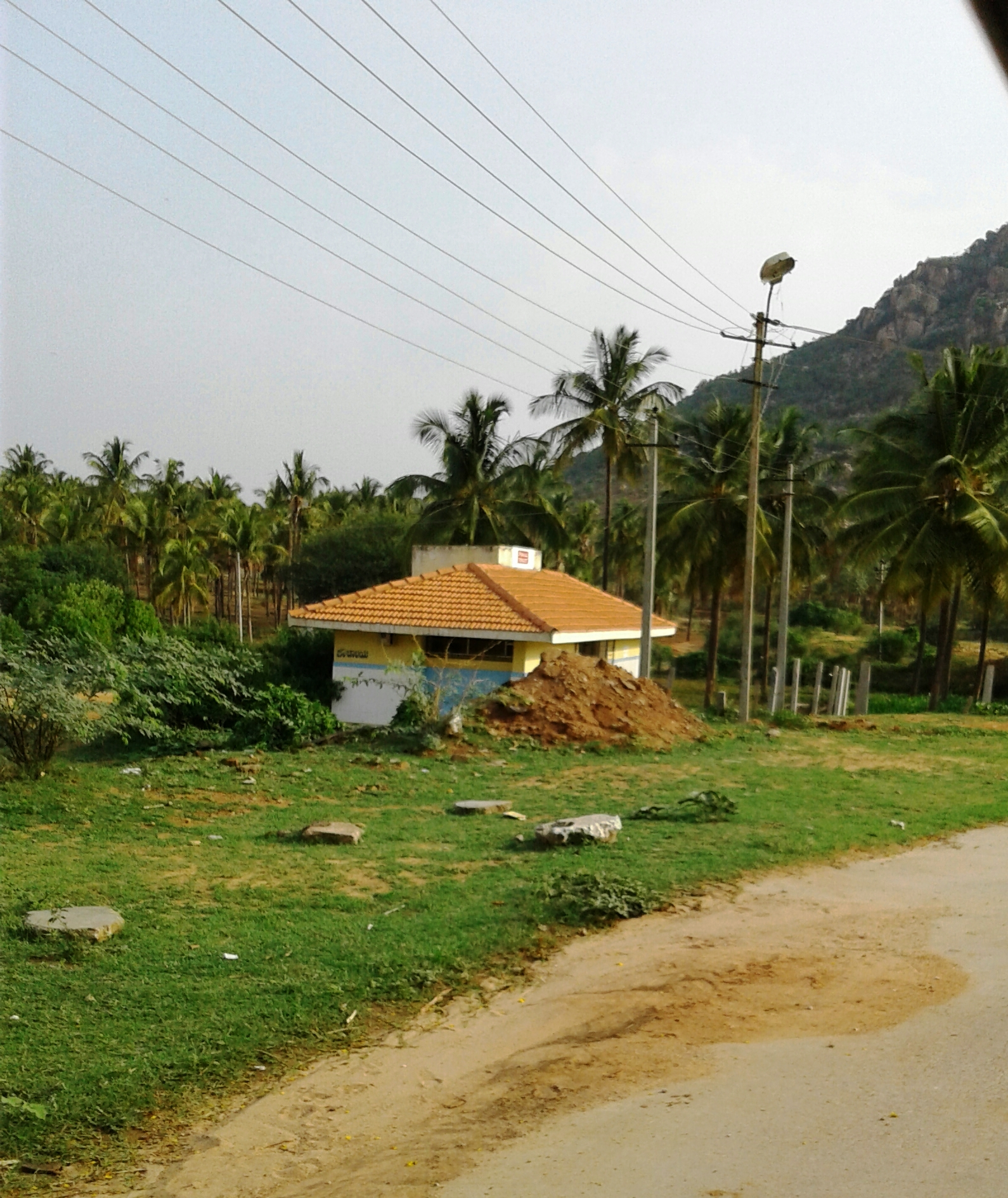
Hill Temple Road

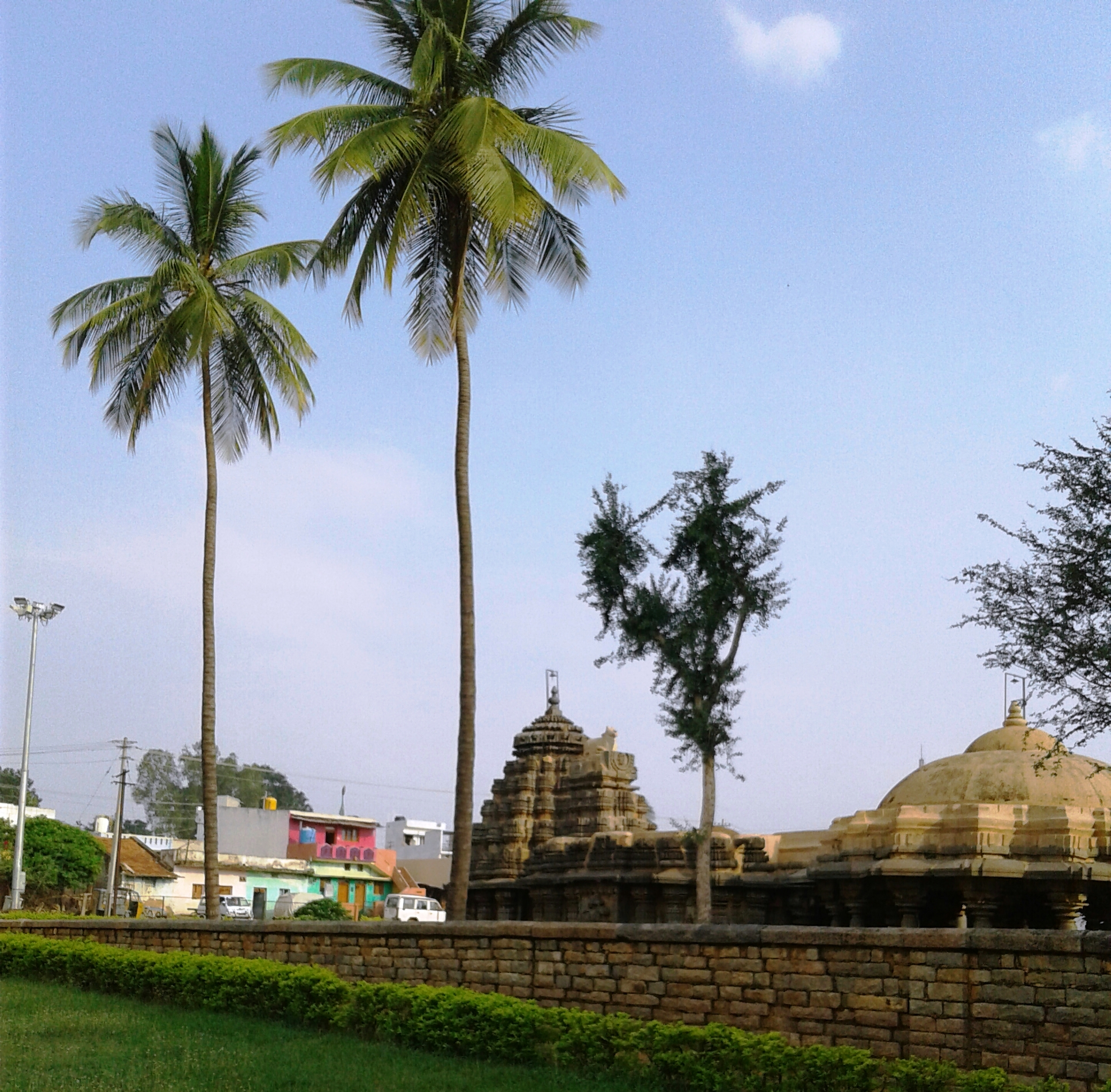
Shivalaya Temple

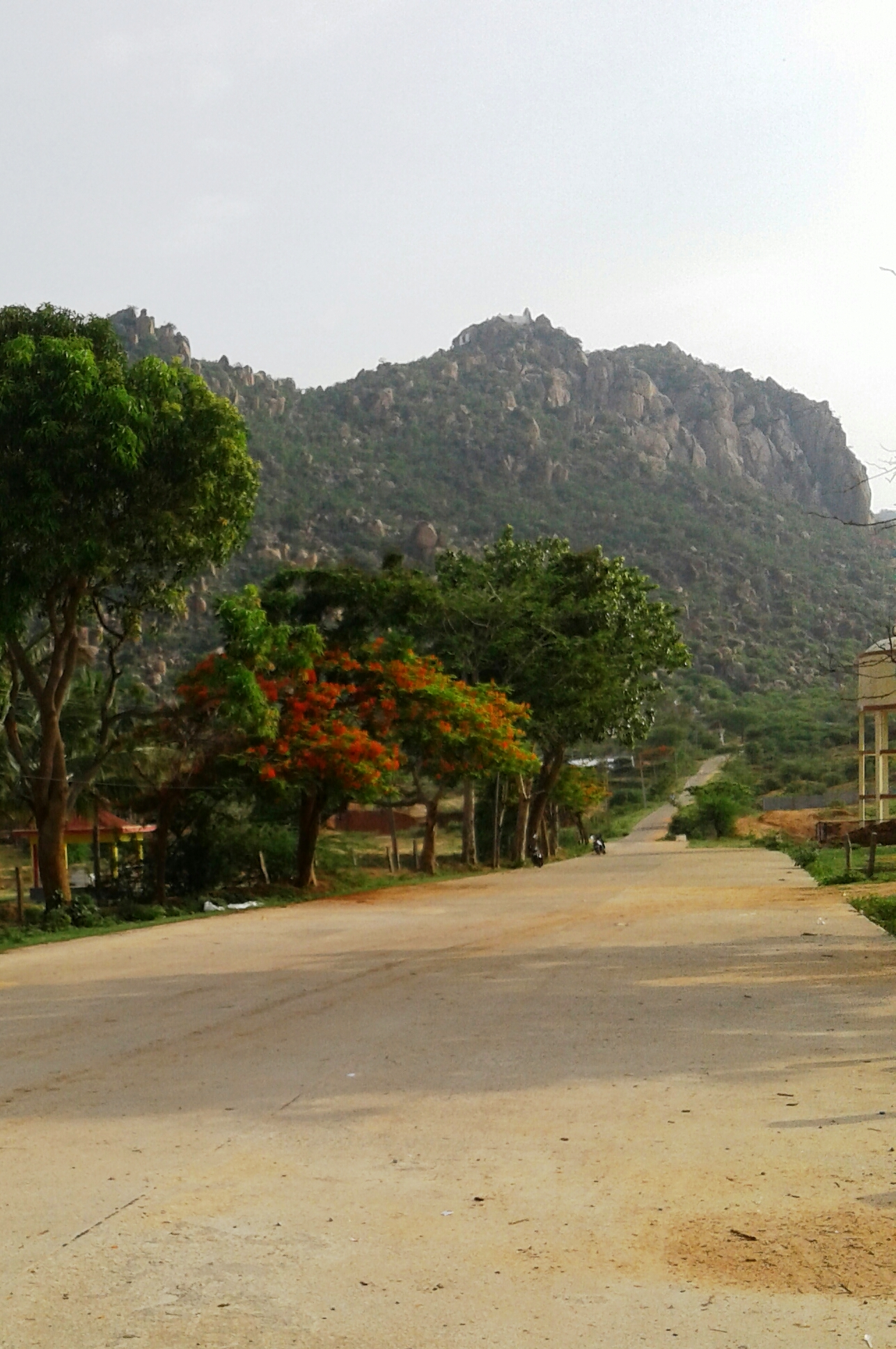
Mini Thirupathi Hills

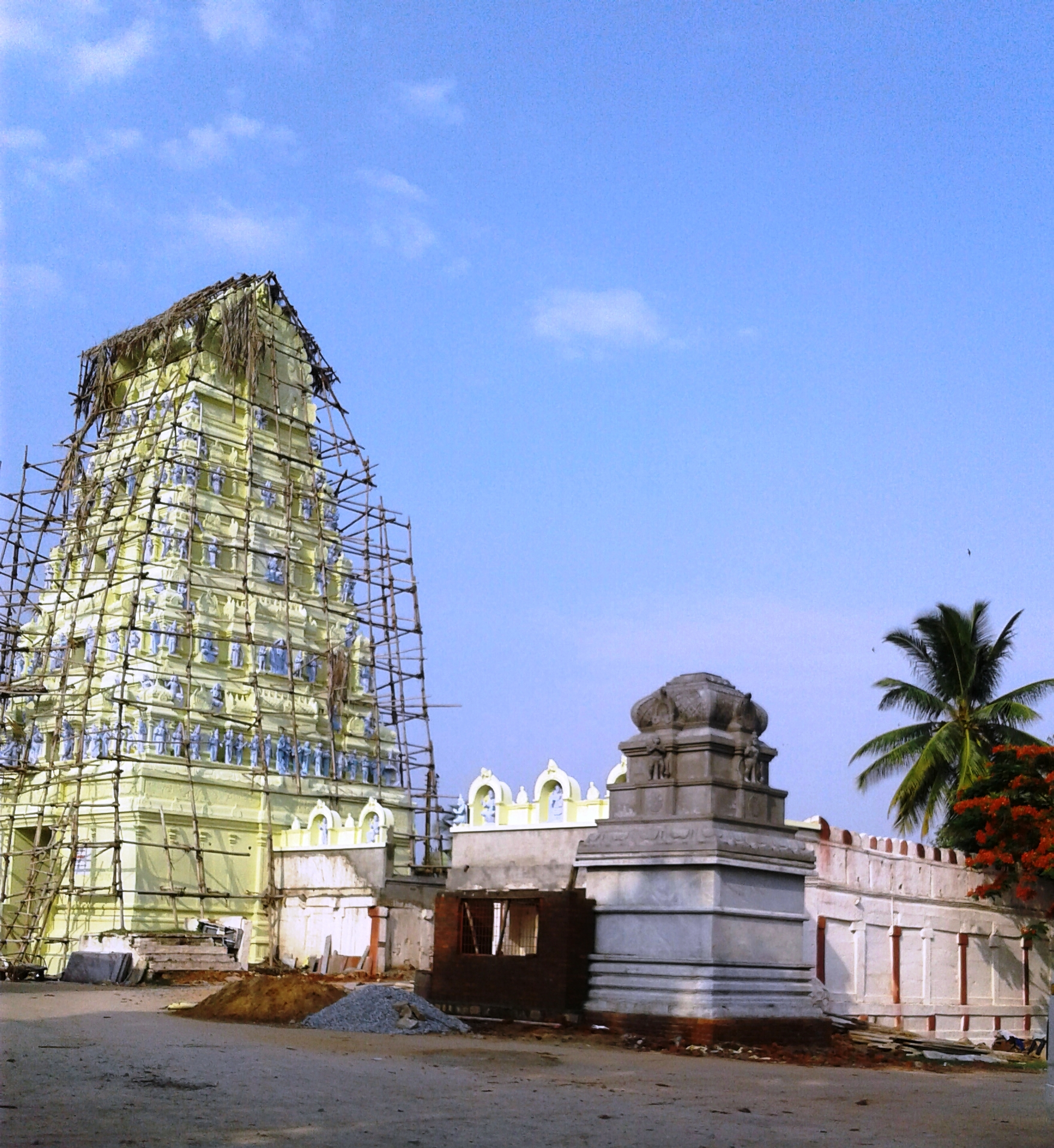
Arsikere Hill Temple

Map of Arasikere Taluk as per 2001 Census

Map of Arasikere Taluk as per 2011 Census

Arasikere Taluk – Hobli and Village Map

Arasikere Taluk – Grama Panchayat and Village Map

Arasikere Taluk Map about Fluoride content in DWS

== See also ==
- Arakere Village
- Ajjanahalli, Arsikere
- Banavara
- Hoysala architecture
- Kanakatte
- Singarasa
- Channarayapatna
- Munjenahalli
- Gandasi Handpost
