= Channarayapatna =

- Town
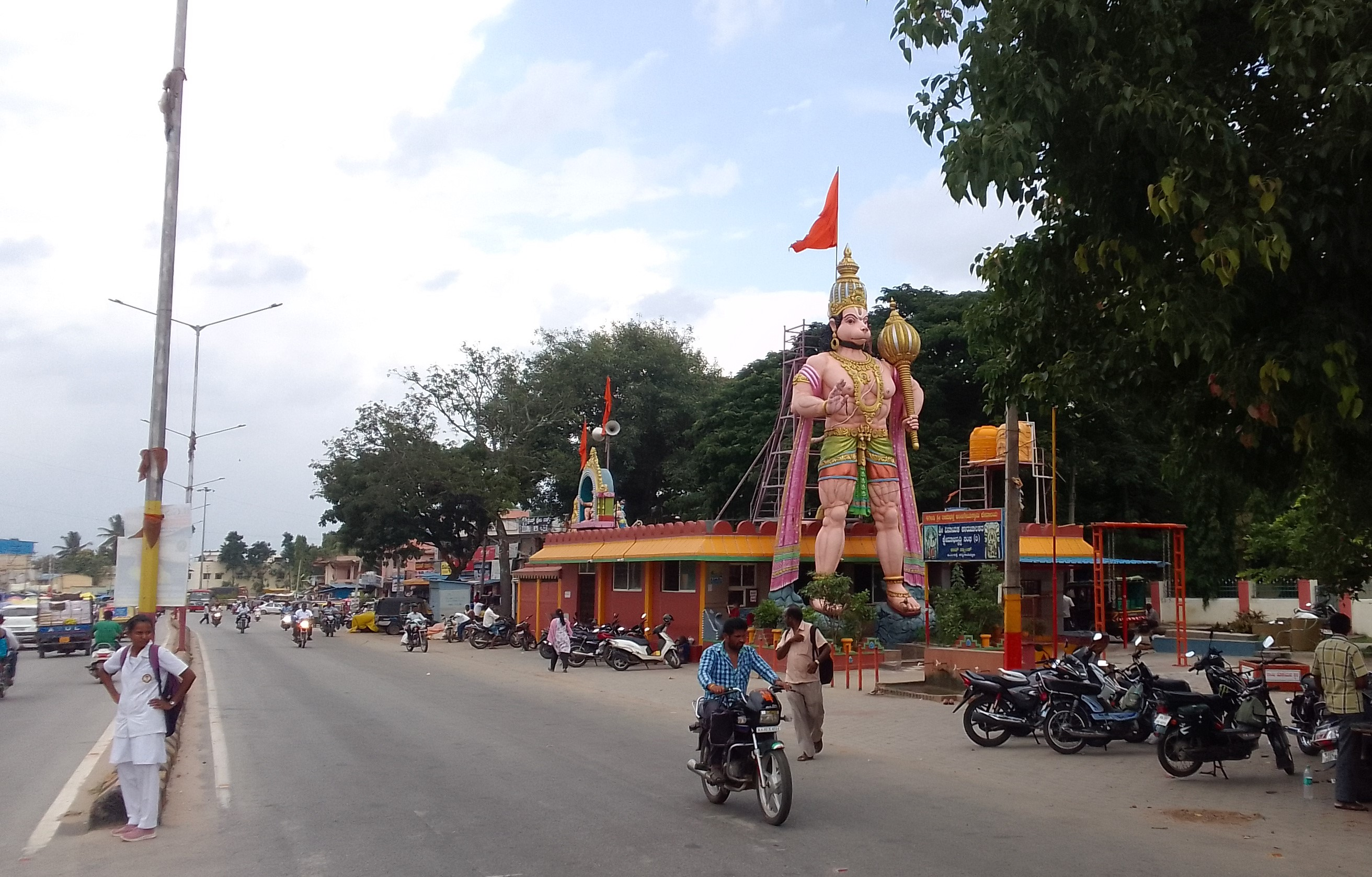

- Location in Karnataka, India
- Coordinates: 12.902°N 76.364°E
- Country: India
- State: Karnataka
- District: Hassan
- Region: Bayaluseeme

Government
  - Body: Town municipal council

Area
  - Town: 10.50 km^{2} (4.05 sq mi)
  - Rural: 1,063.86 km^{2} (410.76 sq mi)
- Elevation: 827 m (2,713 ft)

Population (2011)
  - Town: 40,417
  - Rank: 3rd in Hassan district
  - Density: 3,849/km^{2} (9,969/sq mi)
  - Rural: 241,006

Languages
  - Official: Kannada
- Time zone: UTC+5:30 (Indian Standard Time)
- Postal Index Number (PIN): 573116, 573225
- Telephone code: 08176
- Vehicle registration: KA-13
- Website: www.channarayapatnatown.mrc.gov.in

Channarāyapatna or Channarāyapattana is a town and Taluk in Hassan district of Karnataka, India. It lies on the Bangalore-Mangalore National Highway-75 in Karnataka, India. Jain pilgrimage Shravanabelagola is a famous site in the taluk. Channarayapatna has major railway connection from Bangalore to Mangalore, Karwar, and Mysore.

== History ==
Originally known as Kolatur, the town gained its current name around 1600 CE when a local chieftain called Lakshmappa Nayaka gifted the areas as a Jagir to his son, Channaraya, after whom the town and the local Chennigaraya temple were named. Early monuments and the Vishnu temples in the area dates back to 11th Century Hoysala rule. Local Palegars (chieftains) governed the region under larger Kindoms, and built an early mud and stone fort that was rebuilt by Hyder Ali.

=== Modern Era ===
- Mysore and British Rule: Following the fall of Tipu Sultan in 1799, the region merged into the princely state of Mysore under the Wadeyars and came under British administrative oversight. In 1648 the Mysore rulers built the Channarayapattana fort through a treaty with the Bijapur Sultans.

It was officially designated as a taluk during the reconstructing of Hassan district in the 1860s.

== Geography ==
Channarayapatna is located at 12.90°N 76.39°E. It has an average elevation of 845 metres (2716 ft). It lies directly on National Highway 75 (old NH-48). It is approximately 38km from Hassan city, 148km from Bengaluru and about 12-13km from the prominent jain pilgrimage site of Shravanabelagola.

Bagur Navile Tunnel is located in Channarayapattana, the longest water tunnel in India.

== Tourism ==
- Famous jain center Shravanabelagola: Located about 13km away from Channarayapattana featuring the 57 foot monolithic Bahubali statue on Vindhyagiri Hill and ancient shrines on Chandragiri Hill.
- Nugge Halli, a historic place 20km from Channarayapattana known for the 13th century Lakshmi Narasimha Temple and Sadashiva Temple, showcasing classic Hoysala stone cravings.
- Anekere, is a village which has a Chennakeshava Temple built during Hoysala period.

== Demography ==
As of 2011 India census, Channarayapatna has a population of 279,798. Males constitute 51% of the population and females 49%. Channarayapatna has an average literacy rate of 73%, higher than the national average of 59.5%; with male literacy of 78% and female literacy of 68%. 11% of the population is under 6 years of age.

== Administration ==
=== Taluk ===
Channarayapatna Taluk is one of the eight taluks in Hassan district of Karnataka state. There are 40 panchayat villages in Channarayapatna Taluk, for 407 villages.

== Economy ==
Agriculture is the major economic activity. Sugarcane and coconut are the leading commercial crops, while food crops include ragi, Potato, sunflower, and paddy. The taluk also has mineral reserves, such as chromite.

== Gallery ==
Map of Channarayapatna Taluk as per 2001 Census

Map of Channarayapatna Taluk as per 2001 Census

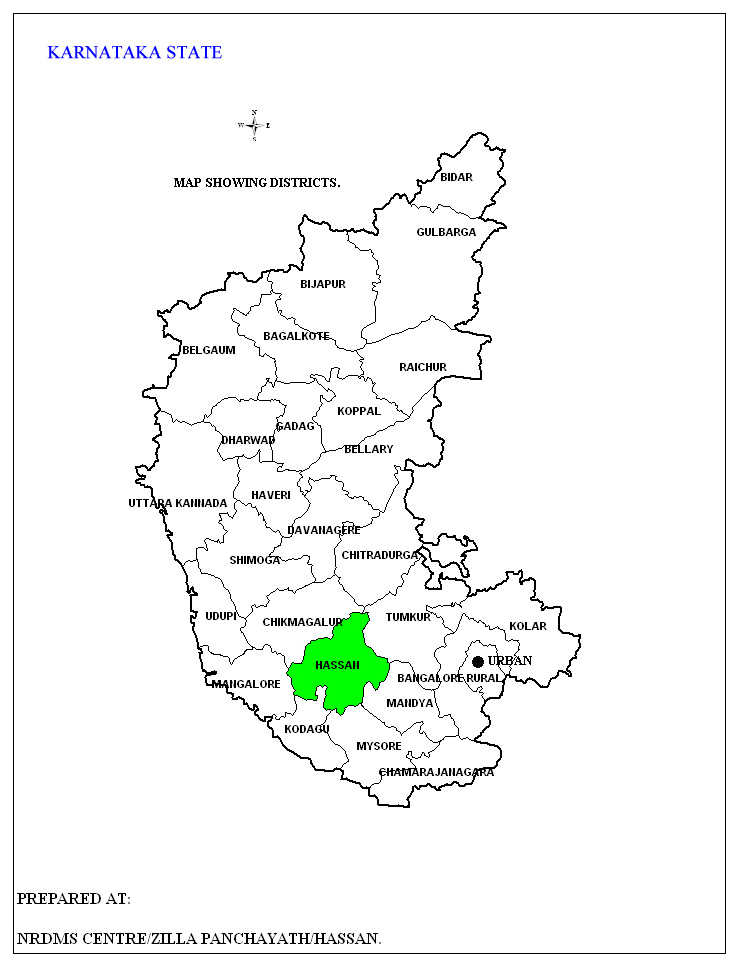
Positioning of Hassan district in Karnataka

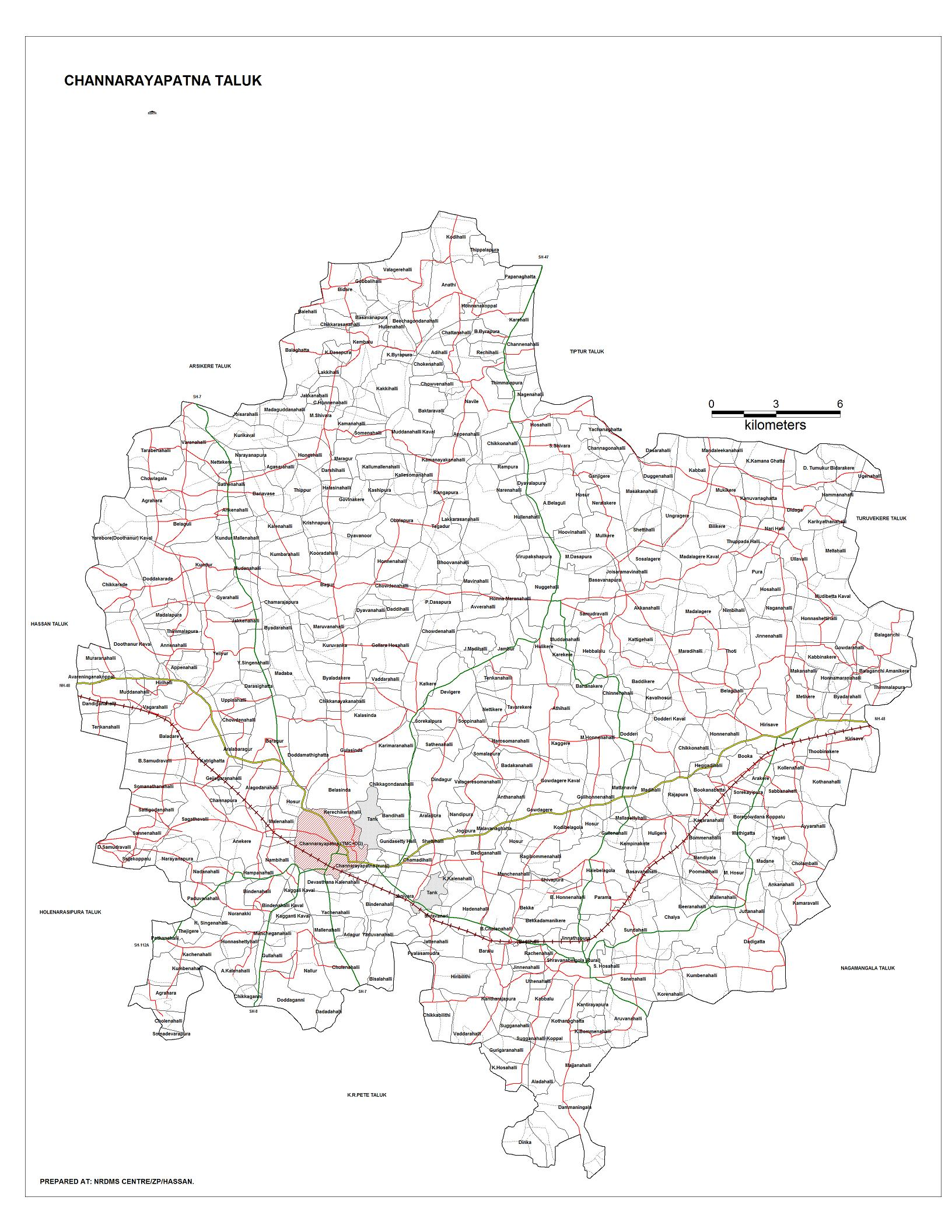
Village map of Channarayapatna Taluk

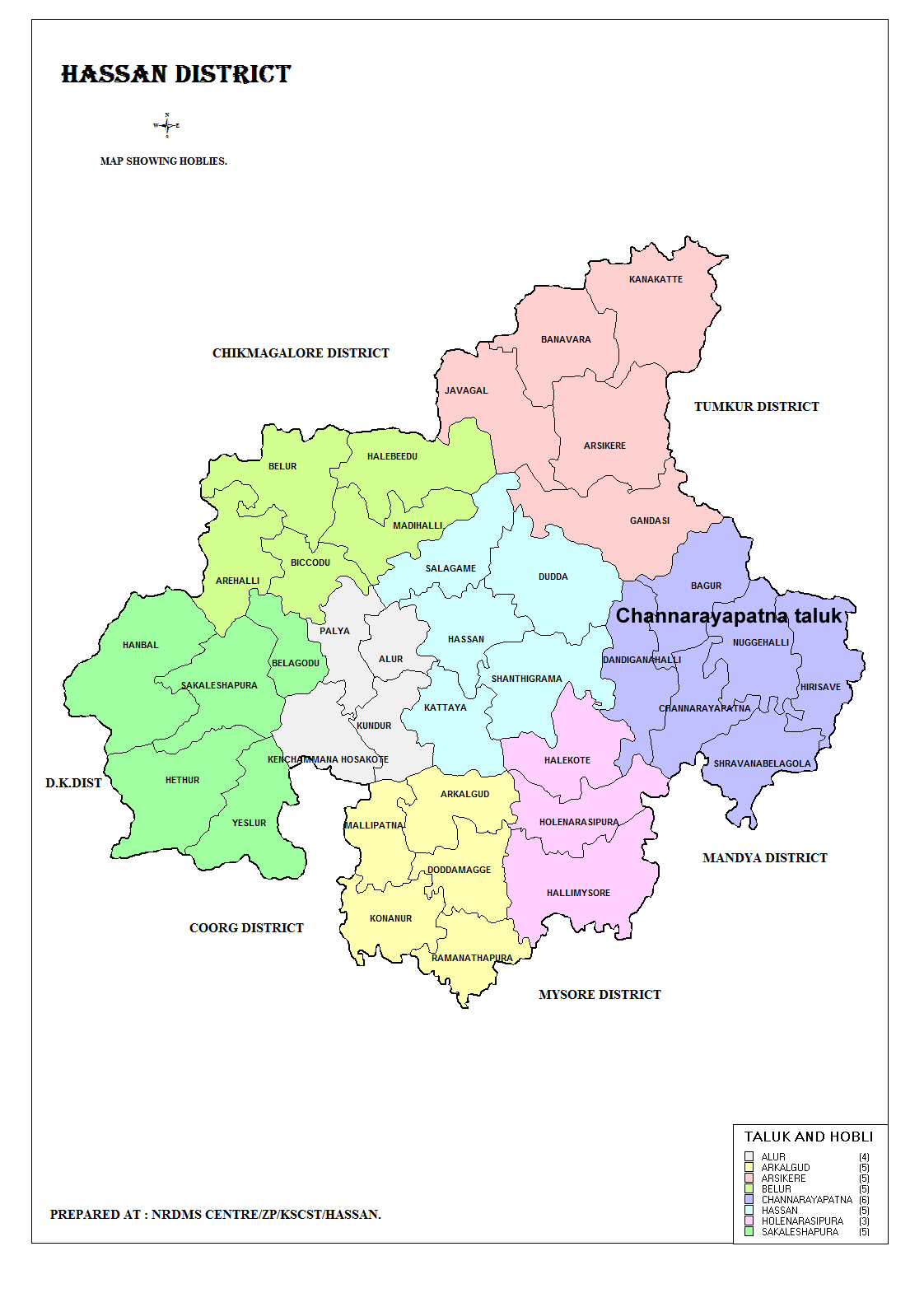
Hobli map of Hassan district

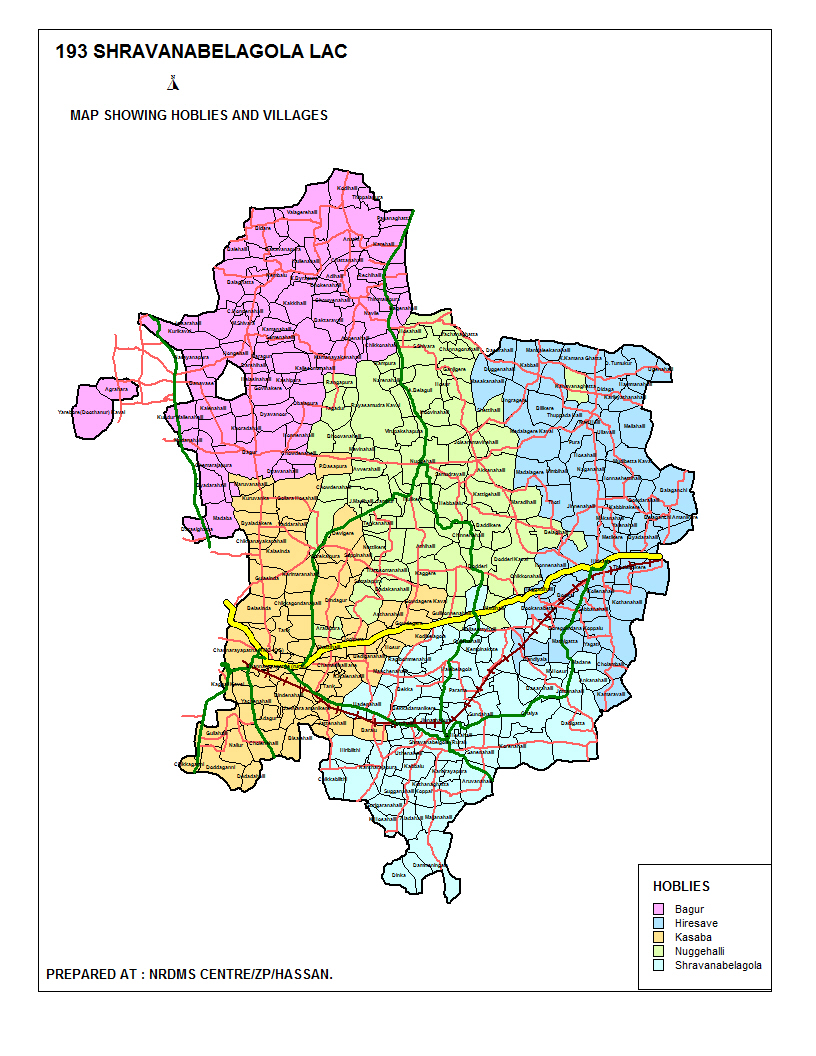
Hobli and village map of Shravanabelagola Assembly constituency, Channarayapatna Taluk

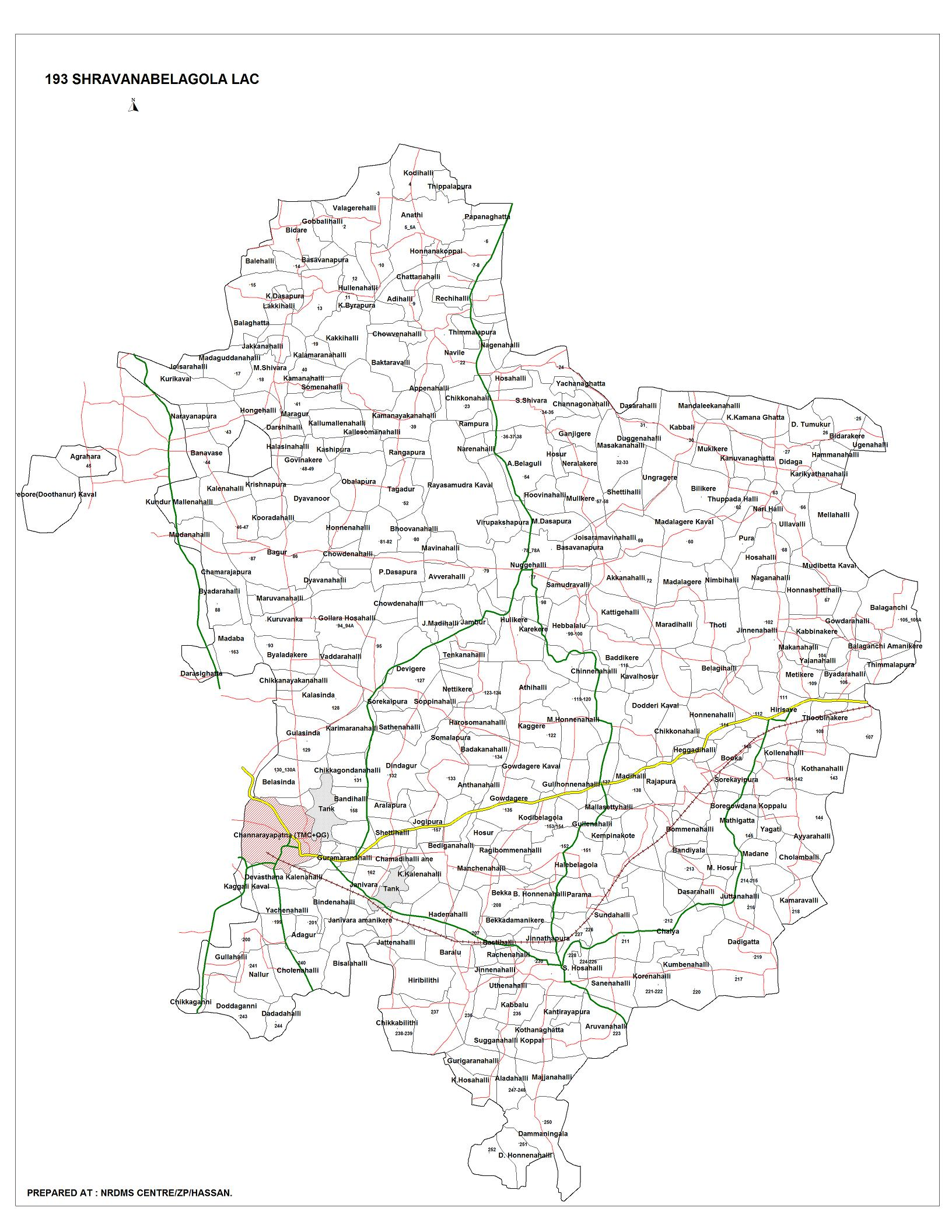
Village map of Shravanabelagola Assembly constituency, Channarayapatna Taluk

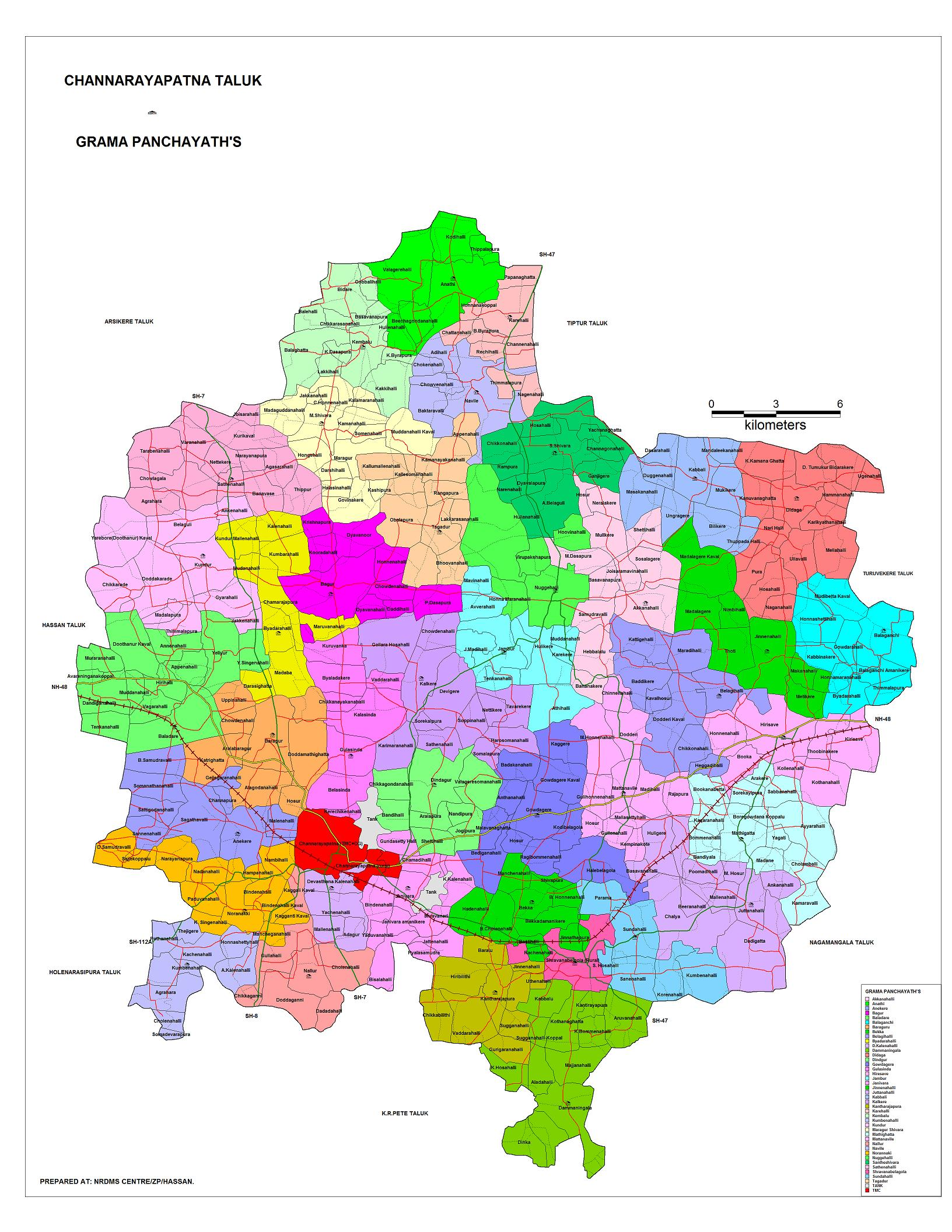
Grama panchayat and village map of Channarayapatna Taluk

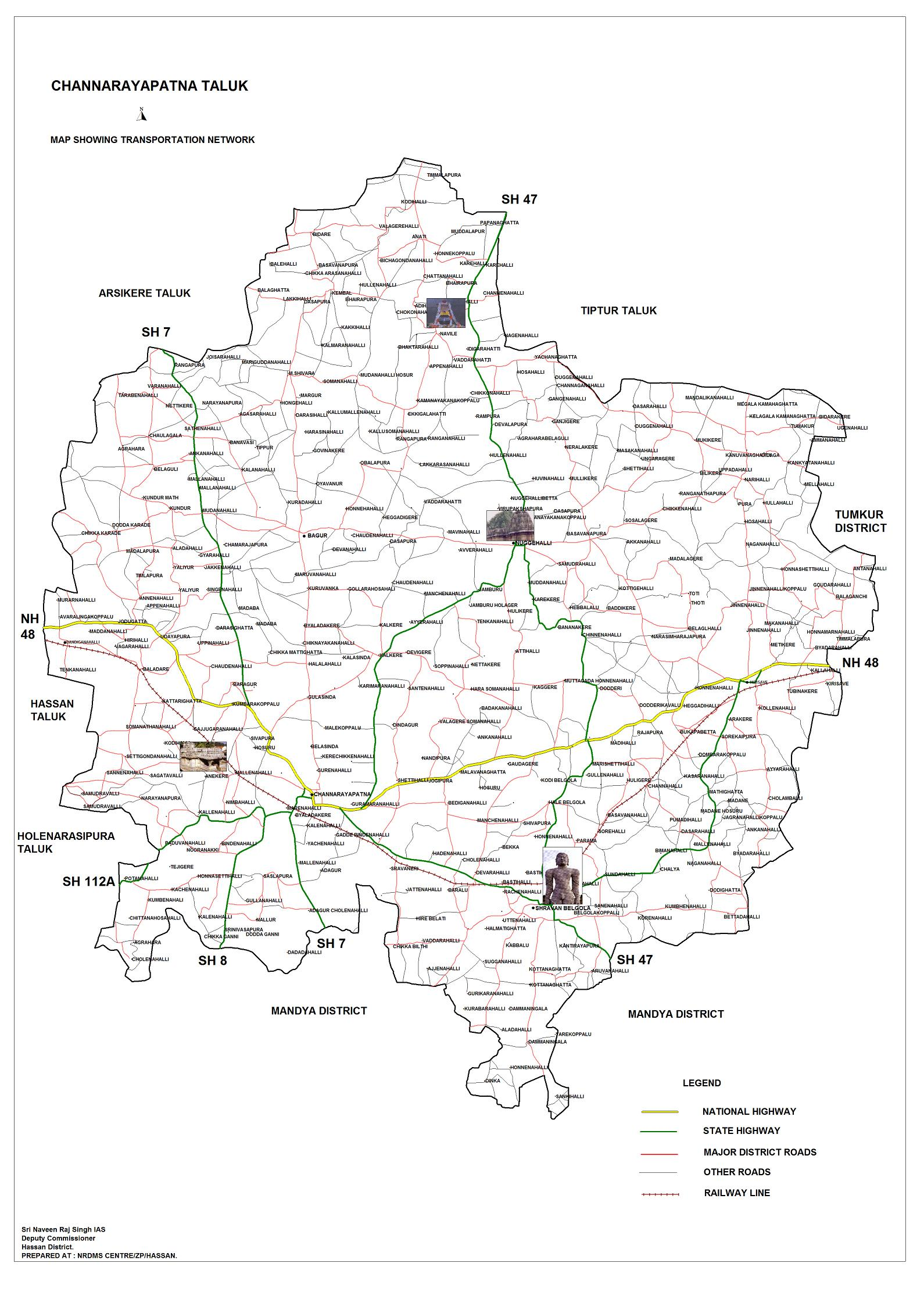
Tourism map of Channarayapatna Taluk

Channarayapatna Taluk - hobli and village map

Channarayapatna Taluk - grama panchayat and village map

Channarayapatna Taluk map about fluoride content in DWS

== Notable people ==
- S. L. Bhyrappa, novelist and professor
- Nanditha, playback singer
- C. N. Manjunath, cardiologist
- H. C. Srikantaiah, former minister and member of Parliament

== See also ==
- Shravanabelagola
- Shravaneri
- Arsikere
- Gandasi Handpost
