= Babburkamme Brahmin =

Community of Brahmins in India

Babburkamme
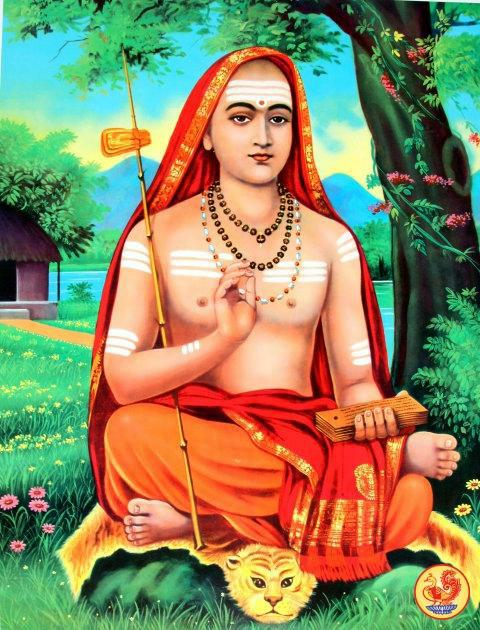
- Adi Shankaracharya, an influential expounder of the smarta parampara and Vedanta.

Regions with significant populations
- Indian states of Karnataka, Andhra Pradesh

Languages
- Sanskrit, Kannada, Telugu,

Religion
- Hinduism Sampradaya: Smarthas Sutra: Apasthamba

Related ethnic groups
- Pancha-Dravida, Kannada Brahmin, Telugu Brahmin, Maharashtrian brahmin, Tamil Brahmin

The Babburkamme (also spelled Babbur Kamme, Bobburukamme, Babboor Kamme) are a community of Brahmins in southern India. They are followers of the Smarta tradition of Vedanta. They have held politically influential position such ministers, chief priests, scholars and poets under different kingdoms. A related community, today known as Uluchukamme, has Kannada as their mother tongue.

Babburkammes are present in the Karnataka towns of Bengaluru, Mysuru, Holenarasipura, Konanur, Arkalgud, Bellur, Kanakatte, Mirle, Arasikere, Belavadi, Mayasandra, Bettadapura, Davangere, Shivamogga, Chikkamagaluru, and Bhadravati. Given their historical presence in the south of India, they are categorized as Pancha Dravida Brahmins.

== History ==
Their tradition is rooted in the pre-Buddhist Apastamba sutras, a kalpa vedanga and the oldest Dharmasutra of ancient India originating plausibly around the river Godavari.

Babburkammes are followers of the Smarta tradition, which is closely associated with the Advaita tradition of Adi Shankara and Sringeri. Kamme is derived from 'Karmin' (Karmigalu in Kannada) meaning those who practice "Vaidika Dharma".

The migration pattern reflects the various Hindu kingdoms and economic centres of their times. Over the last 100 years, the local migration appears to be from small-towns to Mysore and Bangalore, and in recent years to other parts of the world. This trend seems to be coherent with migration patterns of other service-providing communities in the region.

Babburkammes place strong emphasis on education and political influence.

Due to their history, most in the community do not have significant ancestral land or other fixed assets (unlike the business or warrior communities, for example) and therefore formal education is seen as a pathway to success. In addition, and perhaps as a result of advanced education, the community is quite progressive in its outlook.

The founder of the Vijayanaga Empire, Sri Vidyaranya, belonged to the community. Later, his brothers, Madhavacharya and Sayanacharya, contributed to Hinduism by documenting the Vedas and Upanishads for the first time (hitherto it was spread from guru to shishya).

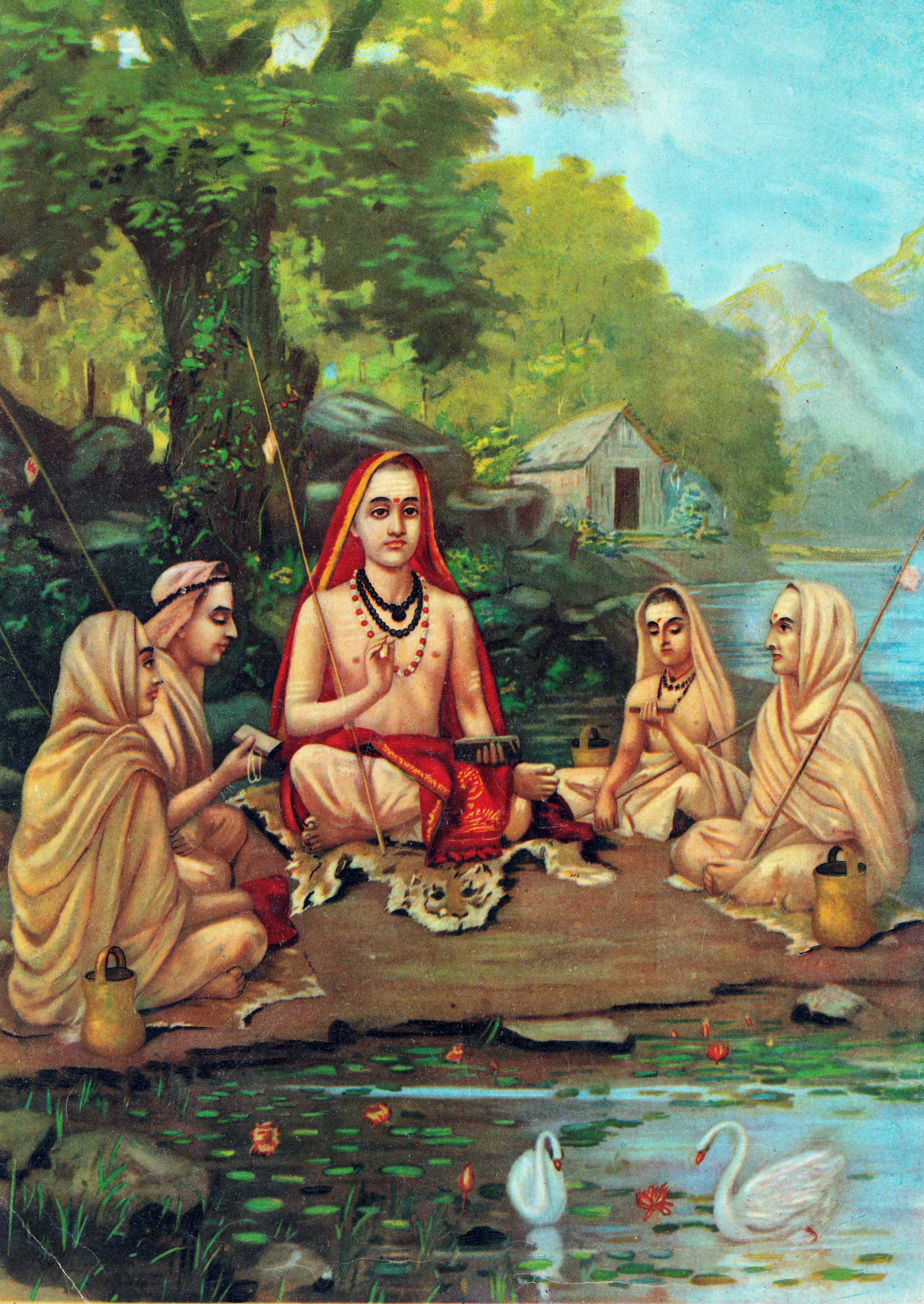
Followers of Adi Shankara

== Culture ==
The mother tongue of majority Babburkamme Brahmins is mostly Kannada and Sanskrit as claimed by some. They are striclty vegetarian (no restriction to use milk, leather and horns).

== Deities and festivals ==
The main deity of Babburkammes is dependent on the family deity or Ishta-Deva. Those deities can be Srinivasa, Shiva-Shakti, Laxmi-Narayana but, being followers of Advaita Smartism, Babburkammes worship all the major forms of God in Hinduism including Shiva, Vishnu, Ganesha, Parvati, Vagdevi, Laxmi, Durga, and Karthikeya.

Babburkamme offer Panchayatana puja worship, introduced by Adi Shankara, and celebrate all the festivals of the Mysore region. They have Shaiva, Vaishnava and Shakta leanings.
