= State Highway 21 (Karnataka) =

Road in Karnataka, India

State Highway 21

Route information
- Maintained by Karnataka Road Development Corporation Limited
- Length: 123.17 km (76.53 mi)

Major junctions
- North end: Halebeedu
- South end: Ane Chowkur

Location
- Country: India
- State: Karnataka
- Districts: Mysuru, Hassan
- Primary destinations: Halebeedu, Hassan, Ramanathapura, Periyapatna, Nagarahole National Park

Highway system
- Roads in India; Expressways; National; State; Asian; State Highways in Karnataka

State Highway 21 also known as SH-21 is a state highway connecting Halebeedu of Hassan and Ane Chowkur forest of Mysuru district, in the south Indian state of Karnataka. It has a total length of 123.17 kilometres (76.53 mi).

Major towns and villages on SH-21 are: Halebeedu, Rajagere, Kyathanakere, Ramadevarahalla kaval, Kondajji, Salagame, ISRO Master Control Facility-Govindapura, Mavinahalli, Dasara Koppalu, Hassan, Hanumanthapura, Agile, Kattaya, Gorur, Ankanayakana halli, Arkalgudu, Mokali, Baraguru, Dodda Magge, Mugaluru, Ramanathapura, Maradi, Raagimaruru, Mallapura, Halaganahalli, Gorahalli, Bettadapura, Coorgal, Eechuru, Hitnehebbagilu, Periyapatna, Boodithittu and Ane Chowkur (Nagarahole).

== Junctions ==
NH 73 Terminal at Halebeedu
NH 373 at Hassan
NH 75 at Hassan
SH 109 at Agile
SH 8 at Arakalgudu
SH 85 at Ramanathapura
NH 275 at Periyapatna
SH 90 Terminal at Ane Chowkur
