= Saligrama, Mysore =

- Town
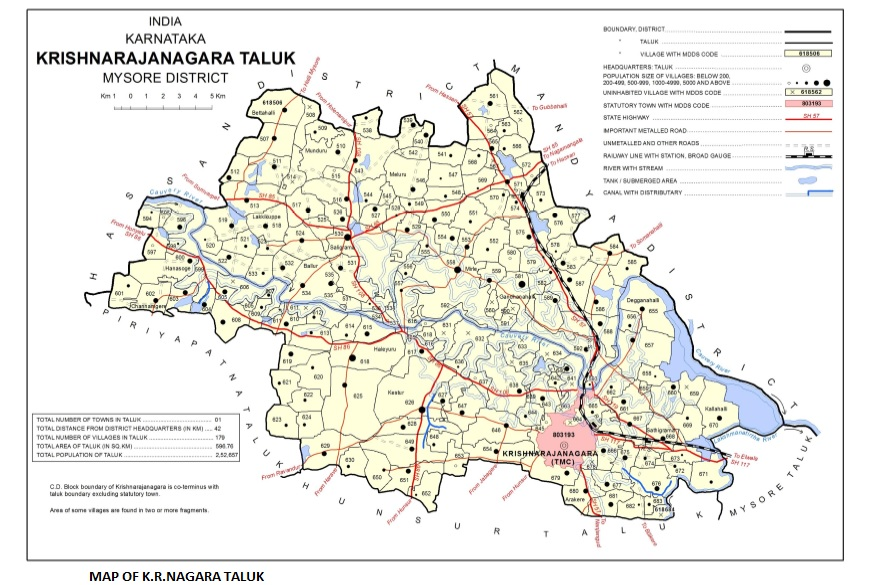
- Krishnarajanagara Taluk boundary before creation of Saligrama Taluk

- Location in Karnataka, India Saligrama, Mysore (India) Saligrama, Mysore (Asia) Saligrama, Mysore (Earth)
- Coordinates: 12.561715°N 76.263292°E
- Country: India
- State: Karnataka
- District: Mysuru
- Saligramam: 1096 CE
- Founder: Sri Ramanujacharya

Government
  - Body: Town Panchayath

Area
  - Total: 14.69 km^{2} (5.67 sq mi)
- Elevation: 788 m (2,585 ft)

Population (2011)
  - Total: 15,123
  - Density: 1,029/km^{2} (2,666/sq mi)

Languages
  - Official: Kannada
- Time zone: UTC+5:30 (IST)
- PIN: 571 604
- Telephone code: +91-8223 [08223]
- ISO 3166 code: IN-KA
- Vehicle registration: KA-45
- Website: saligramatown.mrc.gov.in

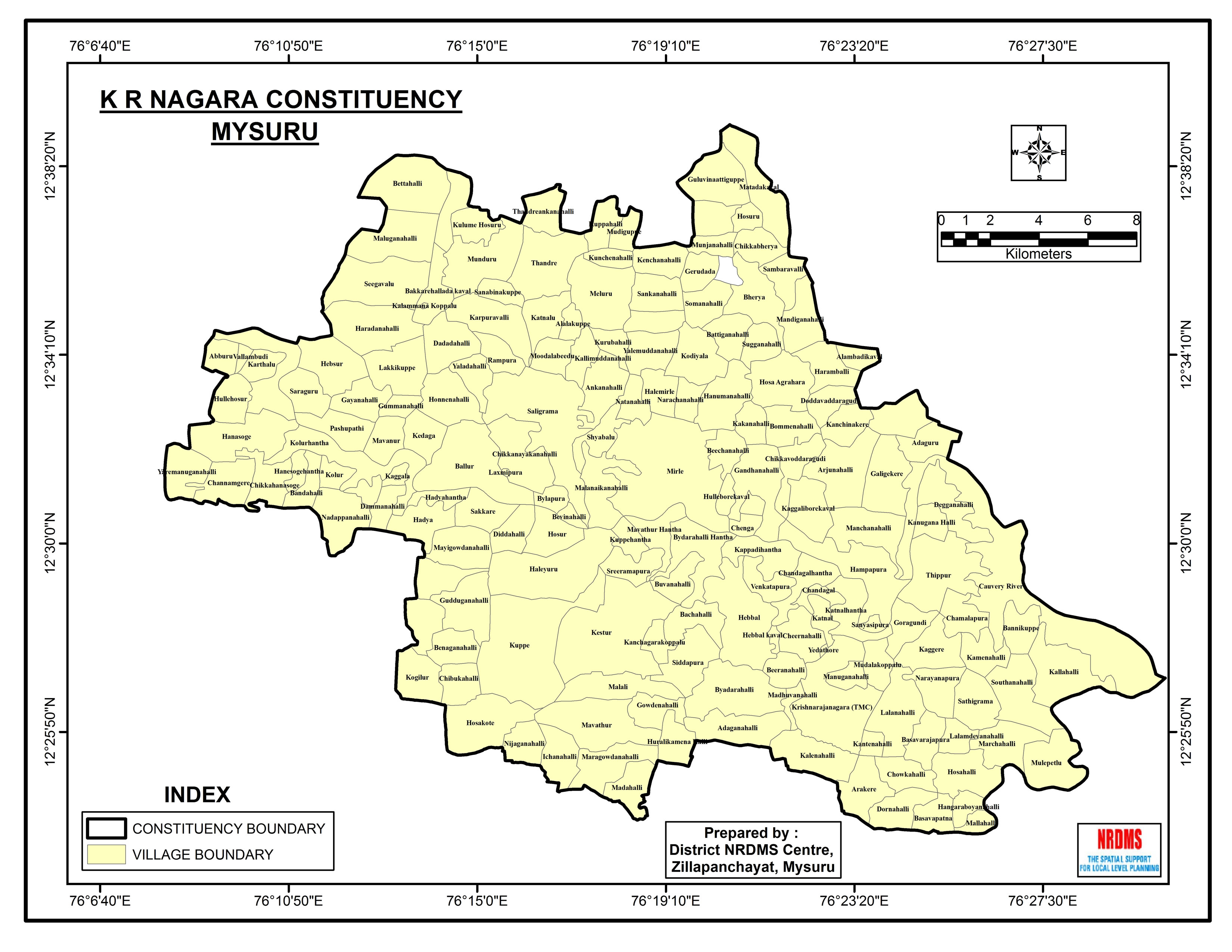
Krishnarajanagara Taluk boundary same as Assembly Constituency as per 2011 Census before creation of Saligrama Taluk

Saaligraama is a taluk in Mysore district, situated on the northern bank of the river Cauvery [Kaveri]. This place is esteemed as sacred by the Shri Vaishnavas on account of its having been the residence of Sri Ramanujacharya. It is the headquarters of Saligrama Taluk. It was established as a new taluk carving out of Krishnarajanagara taluk with effect from 31.12.2020 and become ninth taluk of Mysore district of Karnataka, India.

A number of religious sites, famous old temples - including Sri Yoga Narasimha Swamy Temple, Sri Ramanuja Sripada Teertham, Sri Jyothirmaheswara Swamy Temple, Jain Basadis, and an Ashram are located in the town.

== History ==
Swamy Ramanuja arrived in Karnataka where the local tribals received him in this place. The local people who were averse to Swamy Ramanuja conspired a plan to do away with him. Swamy Ramanuja learning their evil intentions ordered Mudaliandan Swamy to place his feet in the drinking water pond in that area now called Saligrama. At Saligrama, by partaking this Sripada theertham, the minds of the evildoers changed and they fell at Swamy Ramanuja lotus feet seeking forgiveness. Such was the greatness of our Mudaliandan Swamy.

When persecuted by the Chola king Kulottunga, Ramanujacharya is said to have fled the Chola country and first stayed at Vahnipushkarini (the place now known as 'Mirle') from where he moved on to Saligrama.

== Etymology ==
Swamy Ramanuja named this place as "Saligramam" which is near Melkote. Even today this pond is maintained by the archakas who ensures that no intruder pollutes the pond by locking the gate. There is a small temple opposite to this pond in which Swamy Ramanuja's Thiruvadi chuvadugal are worshipped. There is also a deity of Swamy Ramanuja in Sesharoopa near the garbagriha.

== Demographics ==
=== Population ===
According to census data released in 2011 by the Government of Karnataka, total area of Saligrama is spread across 1109.5 hectares with a total population of 11836 persons [Male - 5869 and Female - 5967] and 2976 households with an average of 4 persons per household.

Gender Wise Population
1. Female (50.4%)
2. Male (49.6%)

=== Literacy ===
As per the report the total literacy rate is 71.93% [with Male - 77.33% and Female - 66.59%]. Comparing it with the previous census data, the total literacy rate has increased by 6% with 4% increase in the male and 7% increase in the female literacy rate.

=== Growth in population ===
Presently, there is a 0.5% increase in the total population of the village as it was about 12000 before 10 years. The rate of growth in female population has gone up by 2.9% and male population has decreased by -1.9%. So, the rate of population growth in female is 4.8% higher compared to their counterpart.

=== Sex ratio ===
According to the recent census, there are 1017 females per 1000 males. The overall sex ratio has gone up by 47 females per 1000 males during the period of 10 years. The Child sex ratio here has also increased by 170 girls per 1000 boys at the same duration. For the age group of below 6 years, there are 1060 girls per 1000 boys.

=== Work profile ===
Out of total population, 41% are engaged either in main work or in marginal works - 62% male [55% full time and 7% part time] and 20% female [14% are full time and 7% are marginal] are working.

=== Land usage ===
Different types of land usage
Types of land use	Area (in hectares)
Current Fallows	8.2
Net Area Sown	890.9
Total Irrigated Land Area	541.5
Total Un-irrigated Land Area	349.4
Canals	510
Wells/Tube-wells	31.5

== Education ==
There is a public library.

- Pre-Primary school - 1
- Primary school - 9

Higher Primary school

- Secondary School - 2
- Senior Secondary school - 3
- Pre-university college
- Govt ITI college -1
- Pvt ITI college -1

Government First grade college

== Temples ==
- Sri Yoganarasimha Swamy Temple
- Sri Jyothirmaheshwara Temple
- Sri Ramanuja Sripada Teertham and Temple
- Hanuman Temple
- Kote Anjaneya
- Ganapati Temple
- Shaneshwara Swamy Temple
- Kalikamba Temple
- Shri 1008 Bhagwan Neminath

 Digambar Jain basadi

- Pete Ananthanatha basadi
- Parshwanath basadi
- Chathurtha basadi(Bhakthamara

 basadi)

- kote Ananthanatha basadi
- Gurugalare hill.

== Postal and Courier Services ==
A public Post-office is situated and there are many private courier services available here, also, e-market product delivery services are rendered on a daily basis.

== Transportation ==
SH-85, SH-108 and SH-120 passes through Saligrama town and frequent bus facility is available to Mysore. A public bus stand along with the private facilities such as - buses, taxies, auto-rickshaws, which makes transportation connectivity easier. There is no railway connectivity to Saligrama. The nearest Railway station is Krishnarajanagara [24 kms]. Saligrama is located equidistant from Mysuru Junction railway station and Hassan Junction railway station (approx.60 kms). Nearest major airports are Kannur International Airport, Kerala and Kempegowda International Airport, located at 150 kms and 210 kms, respectively.

== Healthcare ==
A government hospital and many private clinics are situated. Also, there are 7 Medicine shops.

== Law & Order ==
There is a Police-Station located to maintain the law and order, it also covers the small neighboring villages.

== Notable people ==
- Parvathamma Rajkumar, Kannada film industry producer
- S. A. Chinne Gowda, Kannada film producer and distributor
- Sa. Ra. Govindu Kannada film industry producer

== Gallery ==
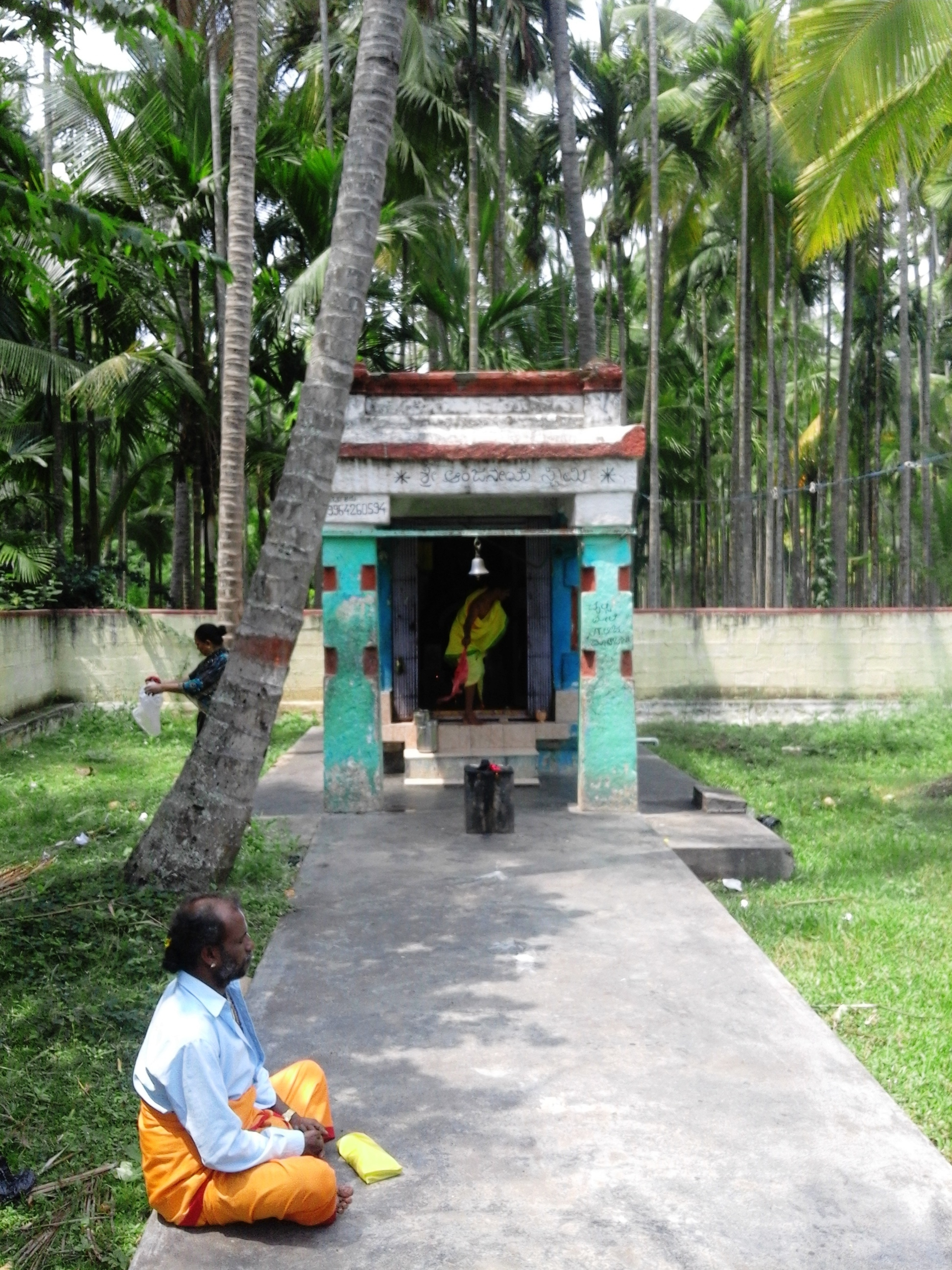
Hanuman temple

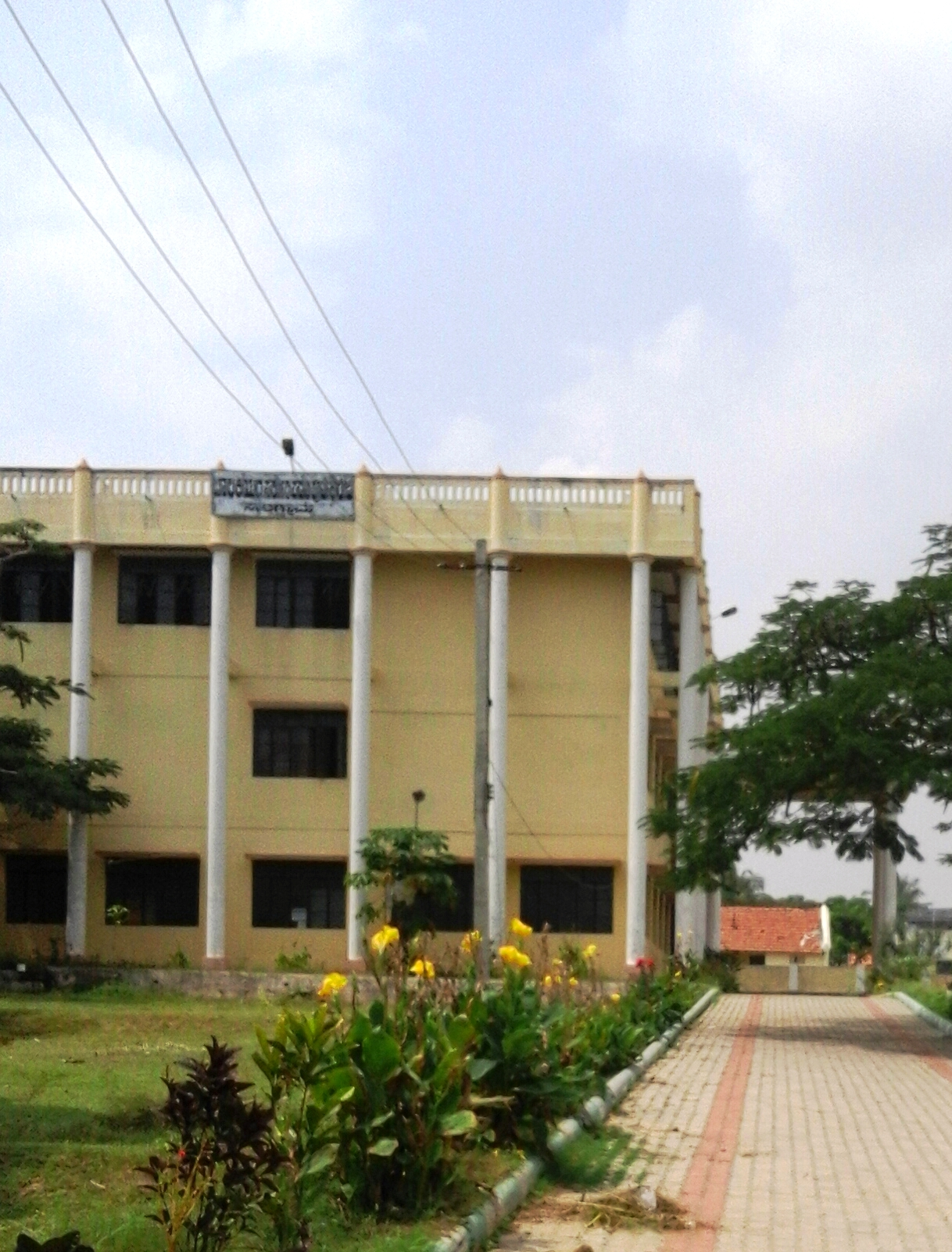
Saligrama Girls College

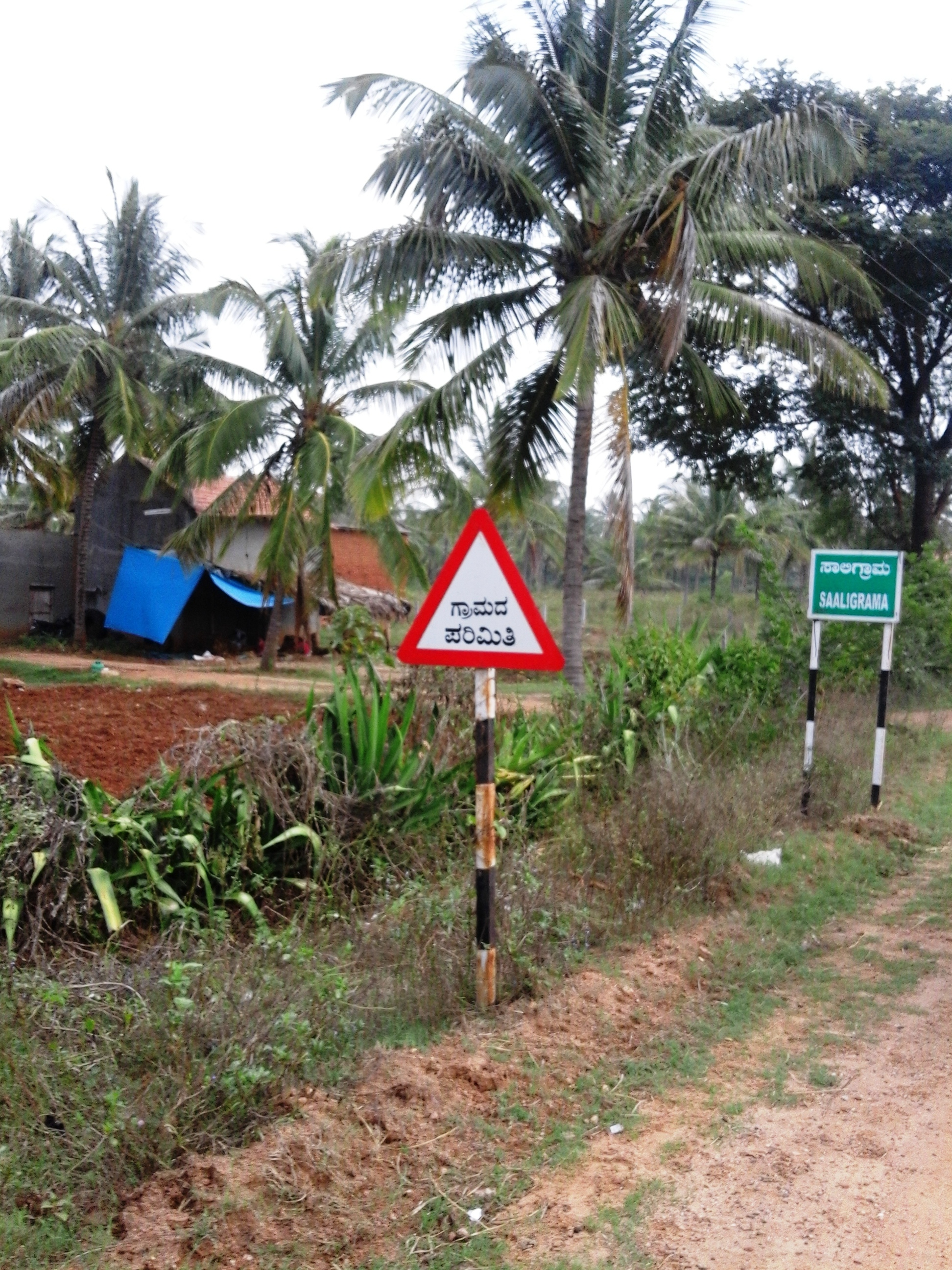
Village entrance

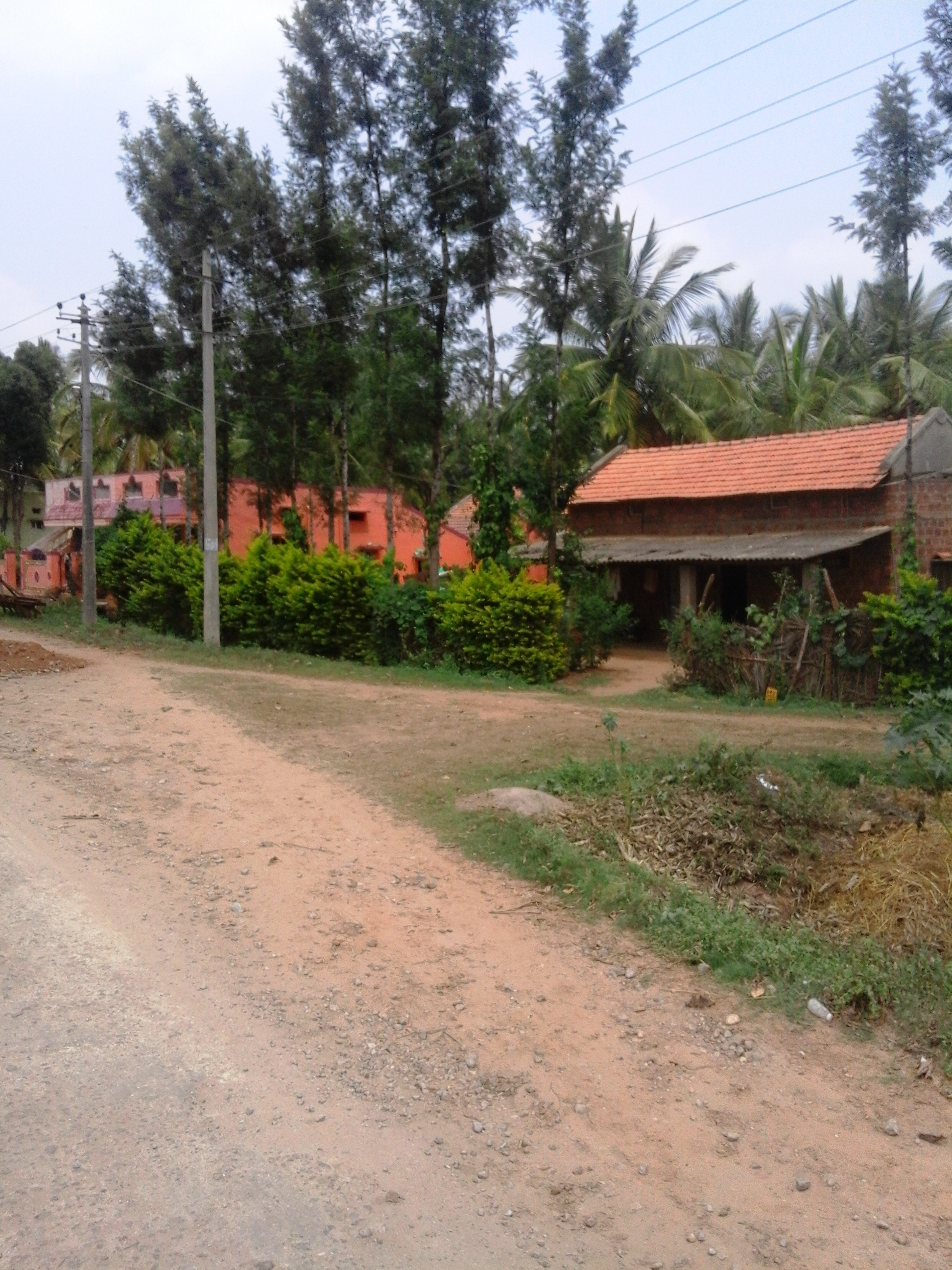
Keralapura village

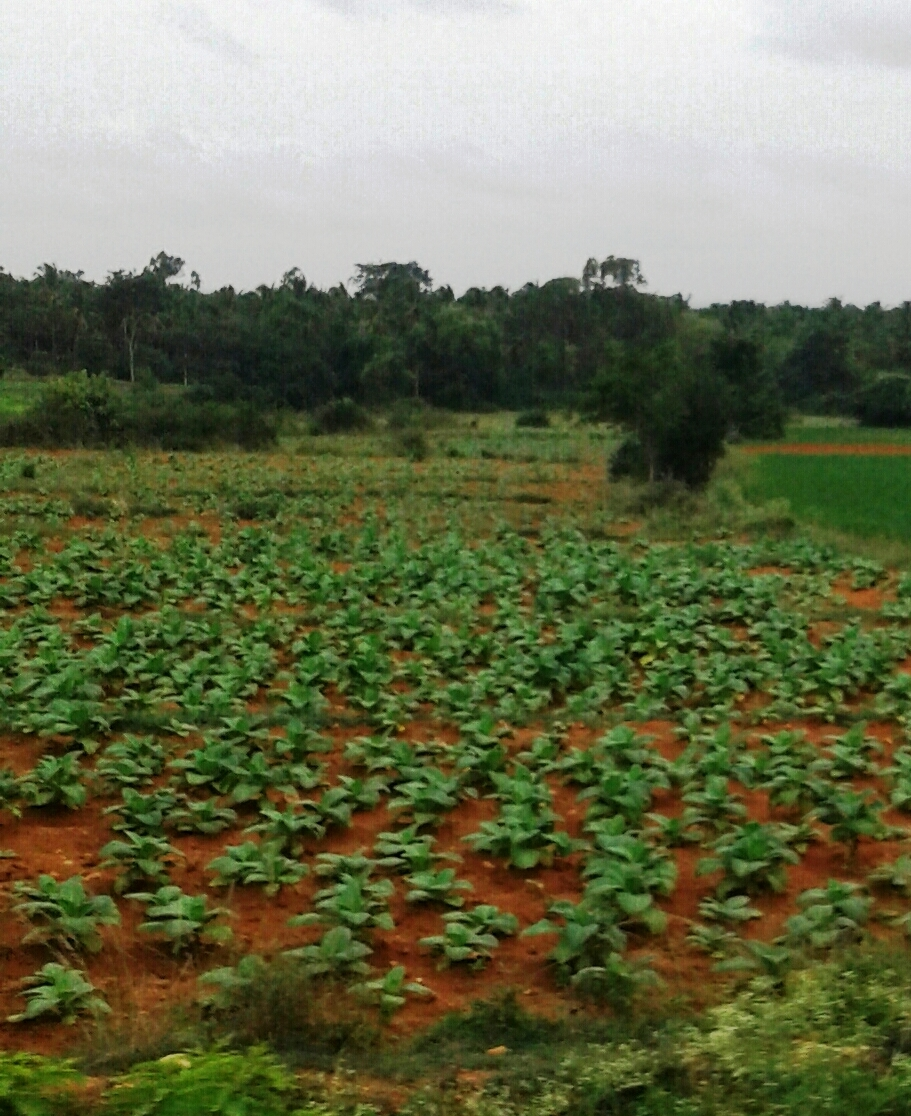
Dadada village

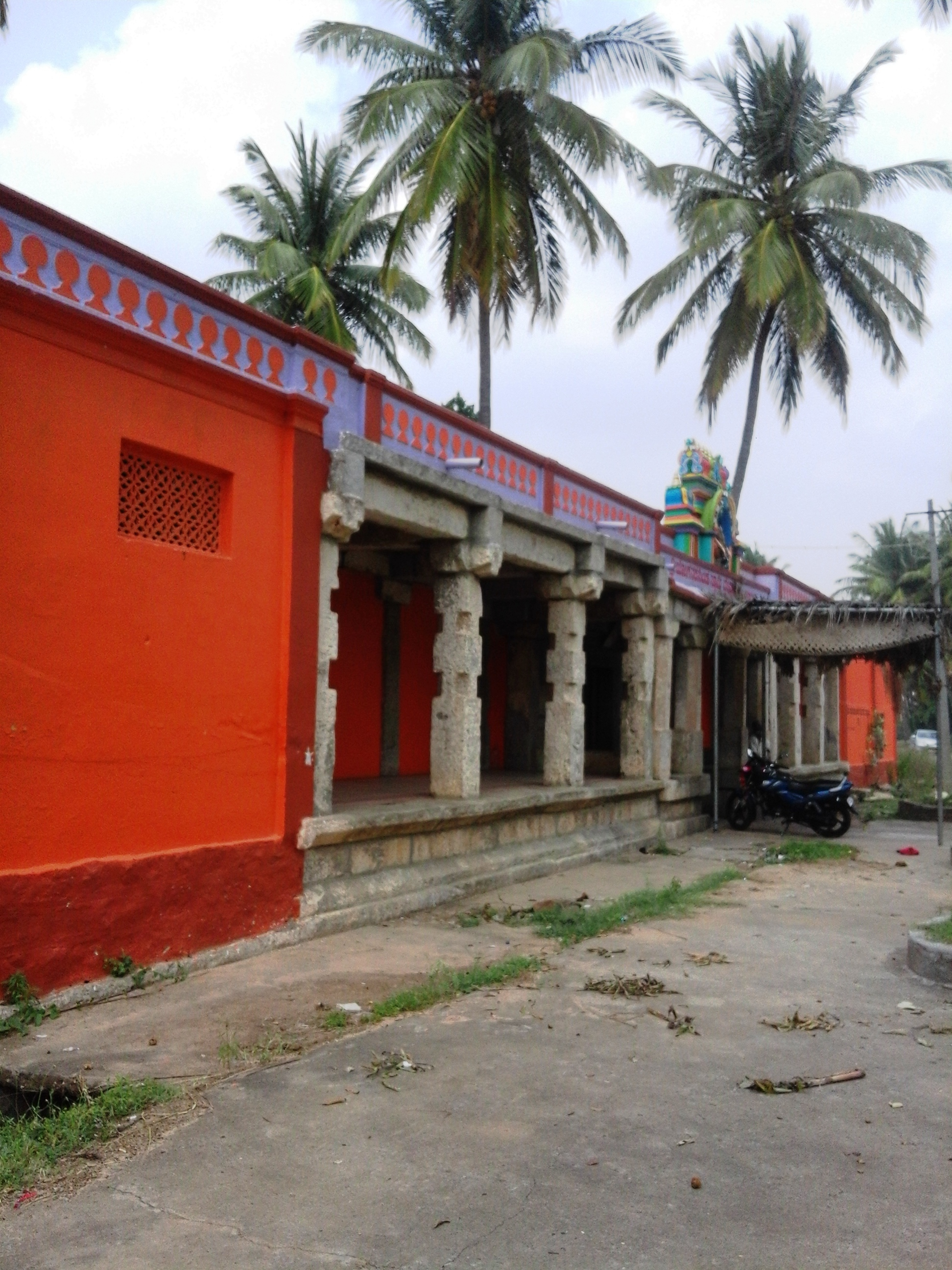
Yoga Narasimha Swamy Temple

== See also ==
- Kanive
- Konanur, Hassan
- Ramanathapura, Hassan
- Kushalanagar
- Hole Narasipur
- Keralapura
- Mysore
- Mangalore
- Arkalgud
