= State Highway 102 (Karnataka) =

Road in Karnataka, India

State Highway 102

Route information
- Maintained by Karnataka Road Development Corporation Limited
- Length: 149.20 km (92.71 mi)

Major junctions
- North end: Huliyar
- South end: Keralapura

Location
- Country: India
- State: Karnataka
- Primary destinations: Jayachamarajapura, Arsikere, Haranahalli, Shantigrama, Hariharpura, Holenarasipura, Niduvani, Nerale

Highway system
- Roads in India; Expressways; National; State; Asian; State Highways in Karnataka

State Highway 102, also known as SH-102, is a state highway connecting Huliyar village of Tumakuru district and Keralapura of Hassan district, in the South Indian state of Karnataka. It has a total length of 149.20 kilometres (92.71 mi).

It is still an unpopular route/highway, due to its connectivity only limited to rural areas. Major towns are Huliyar (Chikkanayakanahalli Taluk), Arsikere and Holenarasipura. Major villages are Jayachamarajapura, Haranahalli, Shantigrama (on NH-75), Hariharapura and Niduvani (Holenarasipura taluk).
