= Adike Bommanahalli =

- village
- Interactive map of Adike Bommanahalli
- Coordinates: 12.7621°N 76.0361°E
- Country: India
- State: Karnataka
- District: Hassan
- Talukas: Arkalgud

Government
  - Body: Village Panchayat

Languages
  - Official: Kannada
- Time zone: UTC+5:30 (IST)
- Nearest city: Hassan, India
- Civic agency: Village Panchayat

Adike Bommanahalli is a village in the southern state of Karnataka, India. It is located in the Arkalgud taluk of Hassan district in Karnataka.

== See also ==
- Hassan
- Districts of Karnataka
