= Keralapura =

- Village
- Location in Karnataka, India
- Coordinates: 12.58315°N 76.17601°E
- Country: India
- State: Karnataka
- District: Hassan
- Taluk: Arakalagudu
- Named for: Military Hotels

Government
  - Body: Grama Panchayath

Area
  - Total: 3.97 km^{2} (1.53 sq mi)
- Elevation: 813 m (2,667 ft)

Population (2011)
  - Total: 4,335
  - Density: 1,090/km^{2} (2,830/sq mi)

Languages
  - Official: Kannada
- Time zone: UTC+5:30 (IST)
- PIN: 573 136
- ISO 3166 code: IN-KA
- Vehicle registration: KA-13

Keralapura is a village in Arkalgud taluk in the Hassan district of Karnataka state, India.

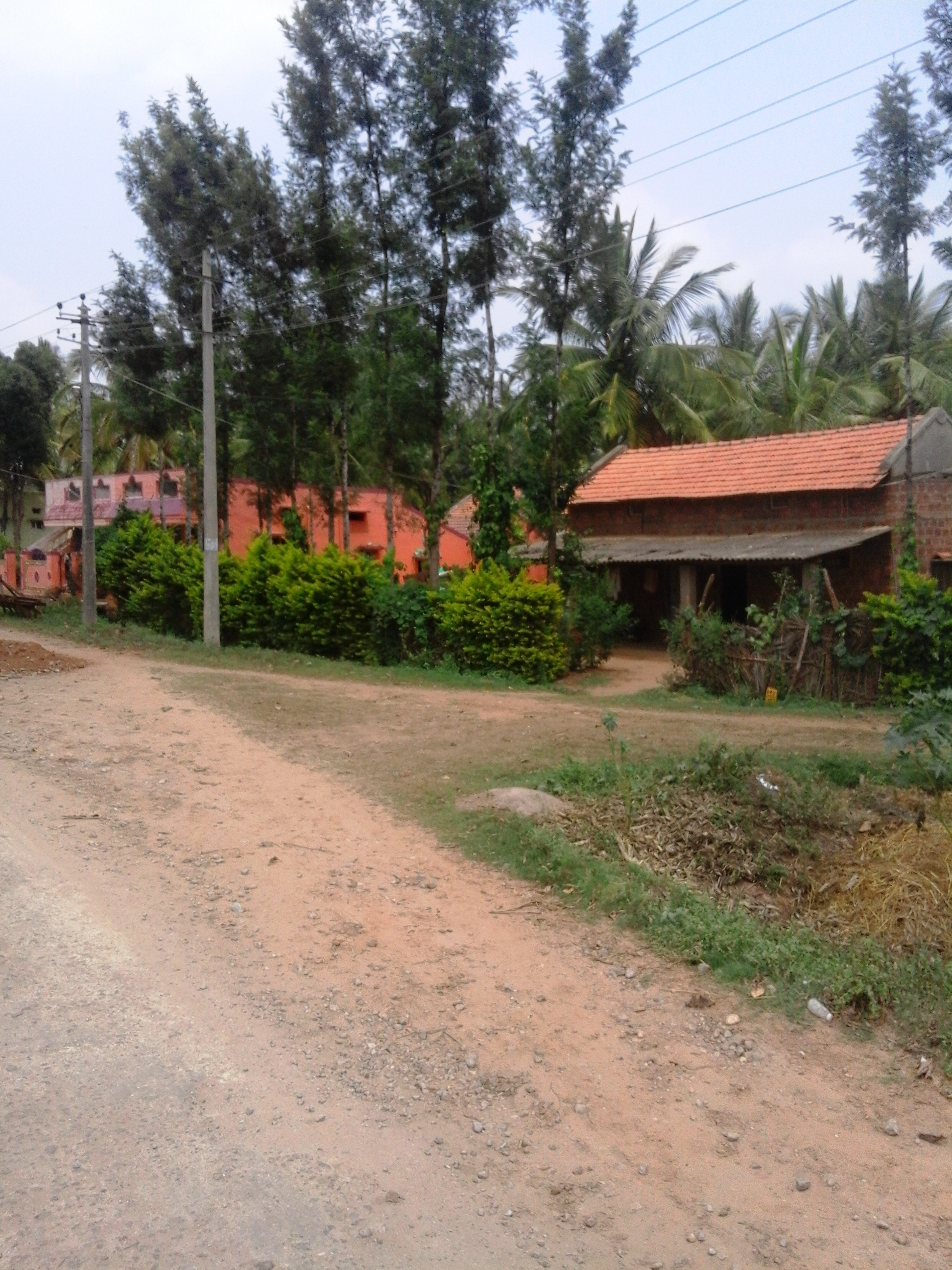
Keralapura village

== Location ==
Keralapura village is located between Saligrama and Ramanathapura towns of Karnataka state in India. The nearest town is Arkalgud at a distance of 30 km.

The State Highway 85, State Highway 86 and State Highway 102 (Karnataka) passes through the town of Keralapura.

Kaveri river is towards the south of the village.

== Post office ==
There is a post office in Keralapura village and the postal code is 573136.

== Economy ==
The village economy is mostly agrarian. There is a branch of Canara Bank in Keralapura. The hotel outlets are called 'Keralapura Hindu Military Hotels'. 'Military' means non-vegetarian food is served. 'Hindu' means only chicken and lamb are served and beef is not cooked.

== Landmarks ==
- Sri.Veerabhadreshwara Temple
- sri srinivasa anjaneya swamy temple
- Shree Hampe Viroopaaksheshwara Swaamy
- Shree Renuka Yallamma Devi Temple
- Shree Hole Saalamma Devi Temple
- Basavana Gudi, Keralapura
- kaveri river

== Villages and suburbs ==
- Rudrapatna, 6 km
- Yalagathavalli, 14 km
- Kattepura, 14 km
- Konanur, 14 km
- Dodda Magge, 15 km
- Bidarakka, 7 km
- Rudrapatna, 7 km
- Basavapatna, 8 km
- Lakkkur, 8 km
- Niduvani, 11 km
- Honnenahalli 2 km

== Demographics ==
The total population of the village is 4,311. There are 969 houses in the village and the village area is 397 hectares.

== See also ==
- Saligrama, Mysore
- Hole Narasipur
- Keralapuram
- Arkalgud
