= Kanive, Kodagu =

Village in Karnataka state, India

Coordinates: 12.510670°N 75.960808°E

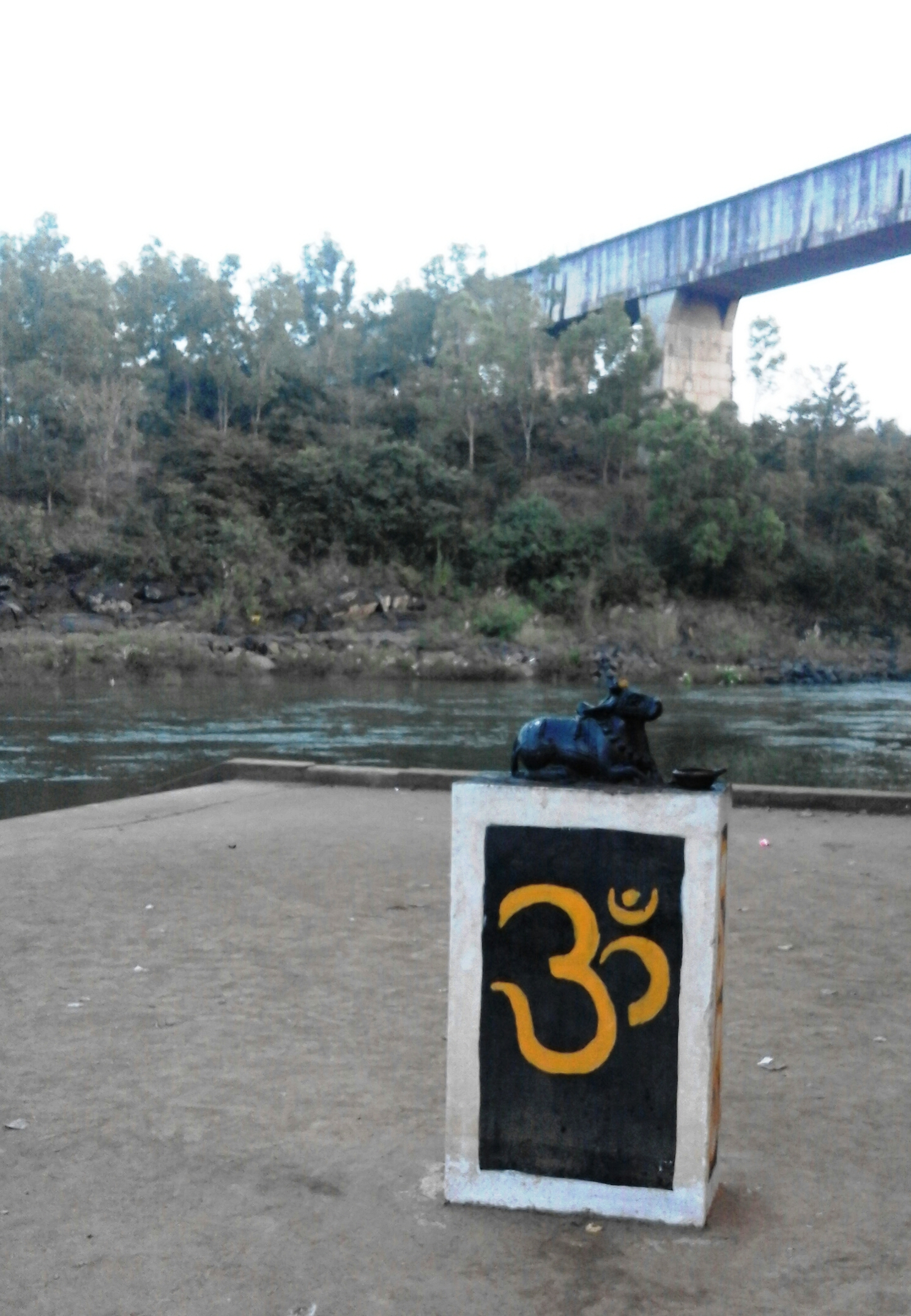
Rama Lingeshwara Temple premises on Kaveri river

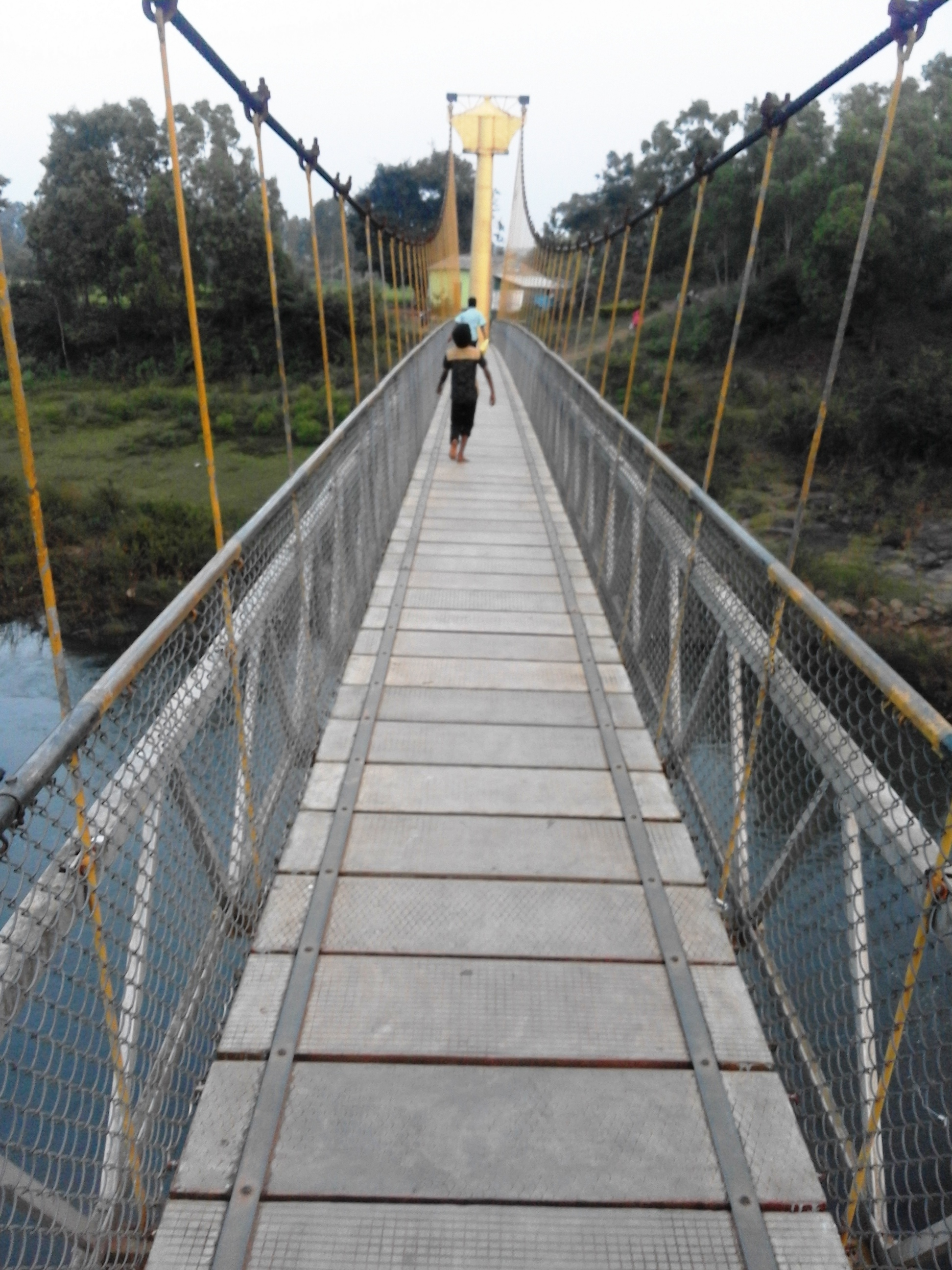
Kanive foot bridge

Kanive is a small village which is located 9 km (5.6 mi) north of Kushalanagar in Kodagu district of Karnataka state, India. Kanive also sits on the bank of Kaveri river. Business tycoon Dodmane Deepak hails from this village.

== Location ==
Kanive village is located near Kudige on the road from Kushal Nagar to Hassan.

== Tourist attractions ==
Kanive village is located on the bank of River Cauvery. The famous Rama Lingeshwara temple is located here. There is a hanging bridge from the temple to the next village.

== See also ==
- Saligrama, Mysore
- Konanur, Hassan
- Ramanathapura, Hassan
- Kushalanagar
- Mangalore
