= Akkalavadi =

Coordinates: 12°39′N 76°01′E

- Village
- Akkalavadi is in Hassan district
- Interactive map of Akkalavadi
- Country: India
- State: Karnataka
- District: Hassan
- Talukas: Arkalgud

Government
  - Body: Village Panchayat

Languages
  - Official: Kannada
- Time zone: UTC+5:30 (IST)
- Nearest city: Hassan
- Civic agency: Village Panchayat

Akkalavadi is a village in the southern state of Karnataka, India. It is located in the Arkalgud taluk of Hassan district in Karnataka.

== See also ==
- Hassan
- Districts of Karnataka
