= Mavinakere =

- Village
- Location in Karnataka, India Mavinakere (India)
- Coordinates: 12°49′33″N 76°12′50″E
- Country: India
- State: Karnataka
- District: Hassan

Languages
  - Official: Kannada
- Time zone: UTC+5:30 (IST)

Mavinakere is a small village near Holenarasipura, Hassan district, in the Indian state of Karnataka.

This village is famous for Mavinakere Sri Lakshmi Venkataramanaswamy temple. Mavinakere Sri Lakshmi Venkataramanaswamy is worshipped as mane devaru, family deity, by many families in and out of Karnataka.
