= Satchidanandendra Saraswati =

Hindu saint of Shankara Advaita tradition

Satchidanandendra Saraswathi
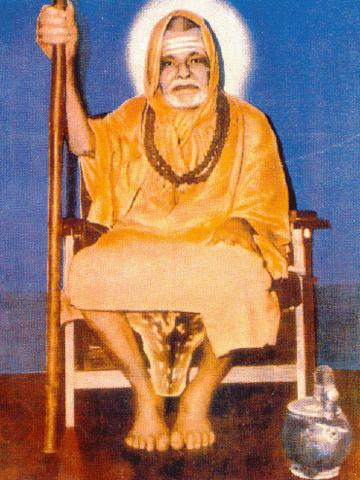
- Born: Sri Yellambalase Subbaraya Sharma; 5 January 1880; Yellambalase, Kadur Taluk, Chikkamagalur district, Karnataka
- Died: 5 August 1975 (aged 95)
- Resting place: Adhyatmaprakasha Karyalaya, Holenarasipura
- Occupation: saint
- Organization: Adhyatmaprakasha Karyalaya
- Known for: Advaita Vedanta

Sri Satchidanandendra Saraswati Swamiji (5 January 1880 – 5 August 1975) was monk-scholar in the Shankara Advaita tradition. He is the founder of the Adhyatma Prakasha Karyalaya in Holenarasipura, Hassan district, Karnataka, India. He was a great Vedantin of Advaita Vedanta.

== Life ==
Swami Satchidanandendra Saraswati (1880-1975) is an exponents of traditional Advaita Vedanta in modern times. Born as Sri Yellambalase Subbarao, he worked as a school teacher in the Indian state of Karnataka. He gave lectures and wrote articles on the Vedanta in English, Kannada and Sanskrit. His books, articles and lectures have made an impact on disciples, pandits, sadhus and scholars in the field of classical Indian philosophy. Satchidanandendra Swamiji authored some 200 works, and he dedicated his life to teaching about the pure Advaita Vedanta philosophy of Shankara.

Satchidanandendra Saraswati was a philosopher who dedicated all his life for the Vedanta sadhana and attained Brahma-jnana. He was known as a Jivanmukta sage. He was an example of a Sanskrit saying, "One should spend one's life until sleep and until death only in Vedantic contemplation".

Having grown up in an orthodox South Indian Brahmin family, young Y. Subbaraya Sharma (as was his name prior to sannyasa) became attached to Vedanta and Hindu philosophy. In 1910 he was initiated into the study of Shankara's scriptures by the Jagadguru Shankaracharya of Sringeri Peetham. He learnt Vedanta from Virupaksha Shastri (the guru of Swami Chandrasekhara Bharati) and K.A. Krishnaswamy Iyer. Swami Satchidanandendra Saraswati soon became well known for having shown that the later Vedantic tradition had in fact deviated from the teachings of the classical acharyas Gaudapada, Shankara and Sureshvara. In 1920 he founded the organisation Adhyatma Prakasha Karyalaya, which is still very active today. He was initiated into sannyasa in 1948. As a sannyasi, Satchidanandendra Swamiji lived a very simple and secluded life at his small ashram in Holenarsipur.

== Teachings ==
According to Satchidanandendra Saraswati, Shankara employed a method called Adhyaropa Apavada, in which a property is imposed (adhyaropa) on Atman to convince one of its existence, whereafter the imposition is removed (apavada) to reveal the true nature of Atman as nondual and undefinable. For example, Atman, the real "I," is described as witness, giving "it" an attribute to separate it from non-self. Since this implies a duality between observer and observed, next the notion of "witness" is dropped, by showing that the Self cannot be seen and is beyond qualifications, and only that what is remains, without using any words: (Note: adhyAropa apavAda)

After one separates oneself i.e. 'I' or Atman from the sense objects, the qualities superimposed on Self are also negated by saying that which not being and not non-being, cannot be described by words, without beginning and end (BG 13.32) or as in Satyam Jnanam Anantam Brahman, beyond words, beyond mind and speech, etc. Here there is an attempt to negate the earlier [sic] attribute like being witness, bliss, most subtlest, etc. After this negation of false superimposition, Self Alone shines. One enters into the state of Nirvikalp Samadhi, where there is no second, no one to experience and hence this state cannot be described in words.

== Literary works of Satchidanandendra Saraswati ==
=== Books written in English ===
- Adhyatma Yoga
- Avasthatraya or The Unique Method of Vedanta
- Collected Works of K. A. Krishnaswamy Iyer
- Essays on Vedanta
- How to Recognize the Method of Vedānta
- Introductions (to vedānta texts)
- Intuition of Reality
- ĪS'āvāsyōpanishad (with the commentary of Sri S'ankaracharya)
- Misconceptions About Śaṅkara
- S'ankara's Sutra-Bhashya (Self-Explained)
- S'uddha-S'āṅkara-Prakriyā-Bhāskara
- Salient Features of Śaṅkara's Vedānta
- Śaṅkara's Clarification of Certain Vedȧntic Concepts
- The Basic Tenets of Śāṅkara Vedānta
- The Method of the Vedanta. A Critical Account of the Advaita Tradition (1989–1997)
- The Heart of Sri Samkara
- The Pristine Pure Advaita Philosophy of Ādi Śaṅkara (Śaṅkara Siddhānta)
- The Reality Beyond All Empirical Dealings
- The Science of Being
- The Unique Teaching of Shankara
- The Upanishadic Approach to Reality
- The Vision of Ātman

==== The Method of the Vedanta ====
In The Method of the Vedanta. A Critical Account of the Advaita Tradition (1989–1997), Satchidanandendra Saraswati gives a critical account of the Advaita tradition. Satchidanandendra Saraswati argues that most of post-Shankara Advaita vedanta actually deviates from Shankara, and that only his student Suresvara, who's had little influence, represents Shankara correctly. In this view, Shankara's influential student Padmapada misunderstood Shankara, while his views were maintained by the Suresvara school. According to Satchidanandendra Sarasvati, "almost all the later Advaitins were influenced by Mandana Misra and Bhaskara." (Note: Potter (2006, pp. 6–7): "...these modern interpreters are implying that most Advaitins after Samkara's time are confused and basically mistaken, and that 99% of the extant classical interpretive literature on Samkara's philosophy is off the mark. This is clearly a remarkably radical conclusion. Yet, there is good reason to think that it may well be true.)

== Sources ==
Printed sources

- Murthy, Laksminarasimha (1973). Adhyatma Prakasha Karyalayada Itihasa (in Kannada). Holenarasipura: Adhyatma Prakasha Karyalaya.
- Murthi, S.K. Arun (2009), "The Mulavidya Controversy Among Advaita Vedantins: Was Sankara Himself responsible?", Journal of Indian Philosophy, 37 (2): 149–177, doi:10.1007/s10781-008-9053-9, S2CID 169267710
- Potter, Karl (2006), Encyclopedia of Indian Philosophies Vol.11: Advaita Vedanta From 800 To 1200, Motilal Banarsidass Publishers Private Limited, ISBN 81-208-3061-X
- Satchidanandendra Sarasvati (1997), The Method of the Vedanta. A Critical Account of the Advaita Tradition, Motilall Banarsidass

Web-sources
