= Ramanathapura =

- village
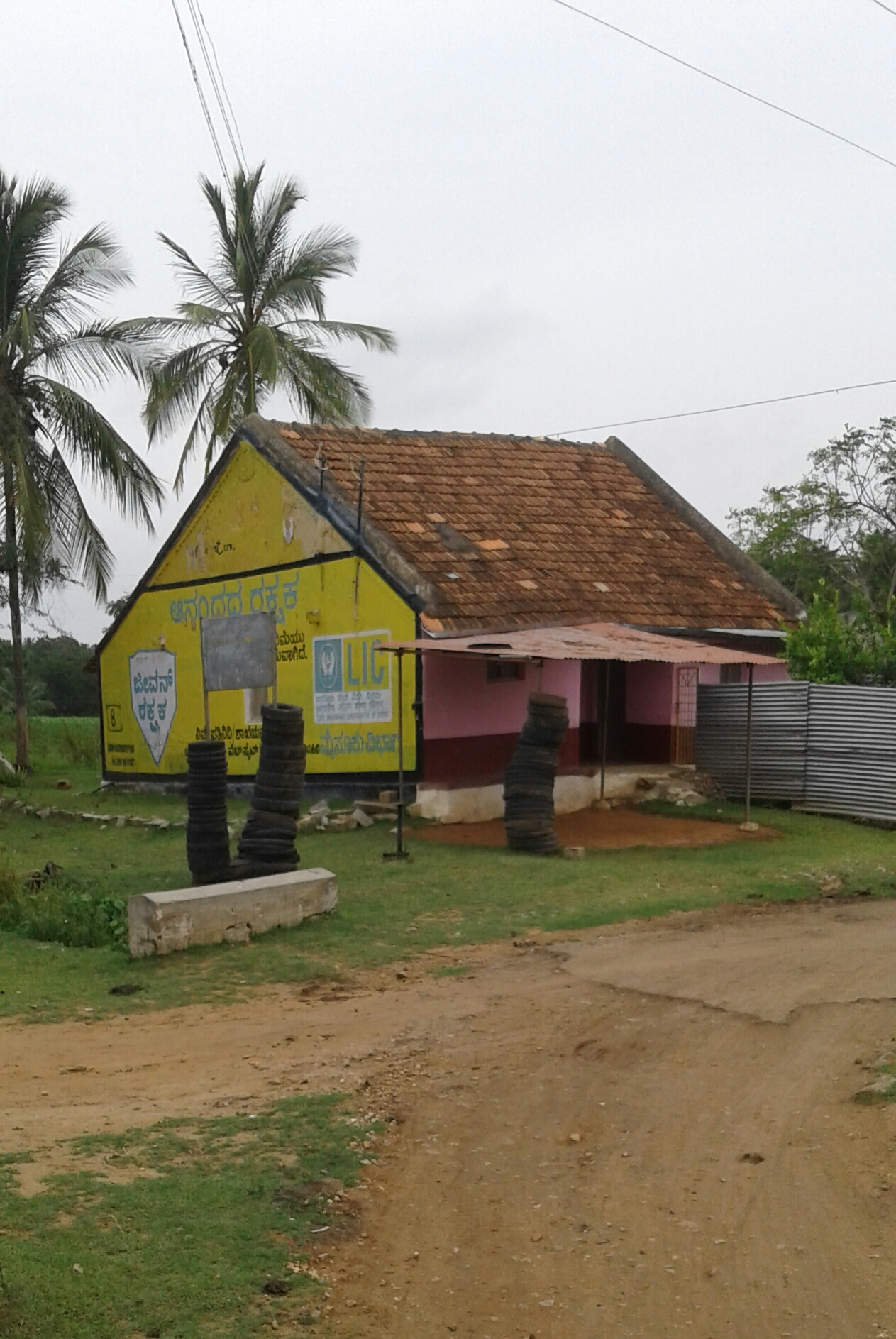
- Ramanathapura
- Interactive map of Ramanathapura
- Country: India
- State: Karnataka
- District: Hassan
- Taluk: Arkalgud
- Elevation: 849 m (2,785 ft)

Population (2011)
  - Total: 1,578

Languages
  - Official: Kannada
- Time zone: UTC+5:30 (IST)

Rāmanāthapura is a village in Hassan district of Karnataka state, India.

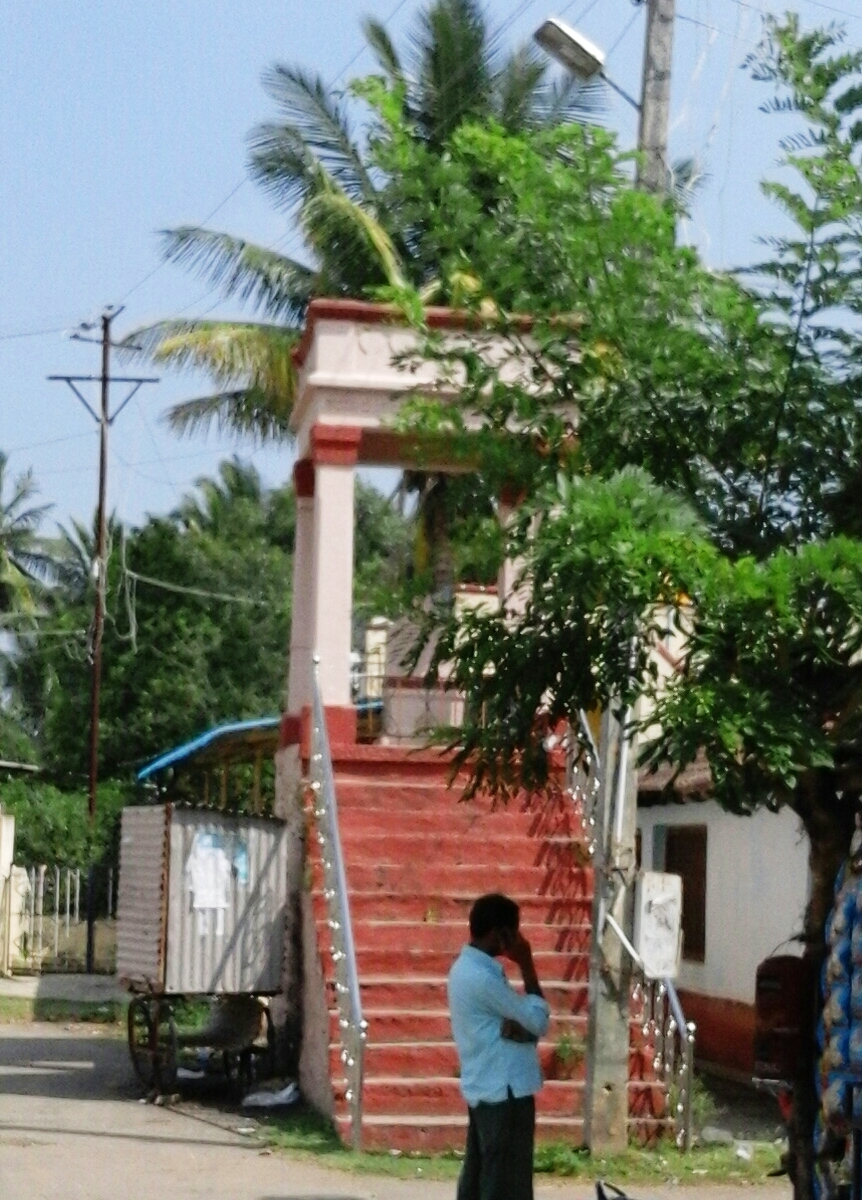
Subramanyia Temple area

== Location ==
Ramanathapura is located between Konanur and Saligrama towns.

== Administration ==
Ramanathapura is part of the Arkalgud taluk which is again part of Hassan district of Karnataka.

== Post office ==
There is a post office at Ramanathapura and the postal code is 573133.

== Educational organizations ==
- HMS Padavi Purva College
- BSS Junior College
- Kuvempu School
- JSP School
- GHP School

== Gallery ==
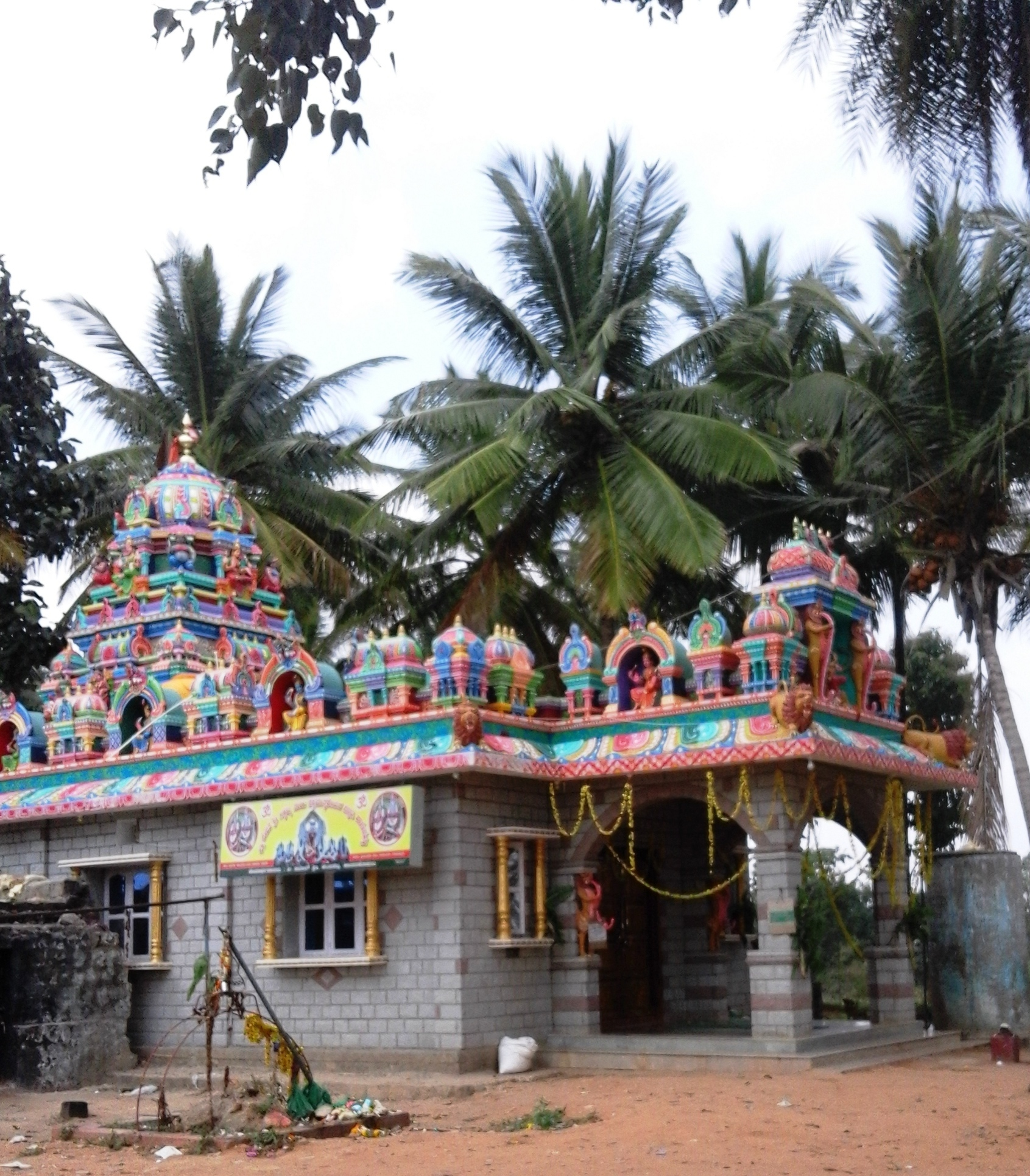
Hiddamma temple

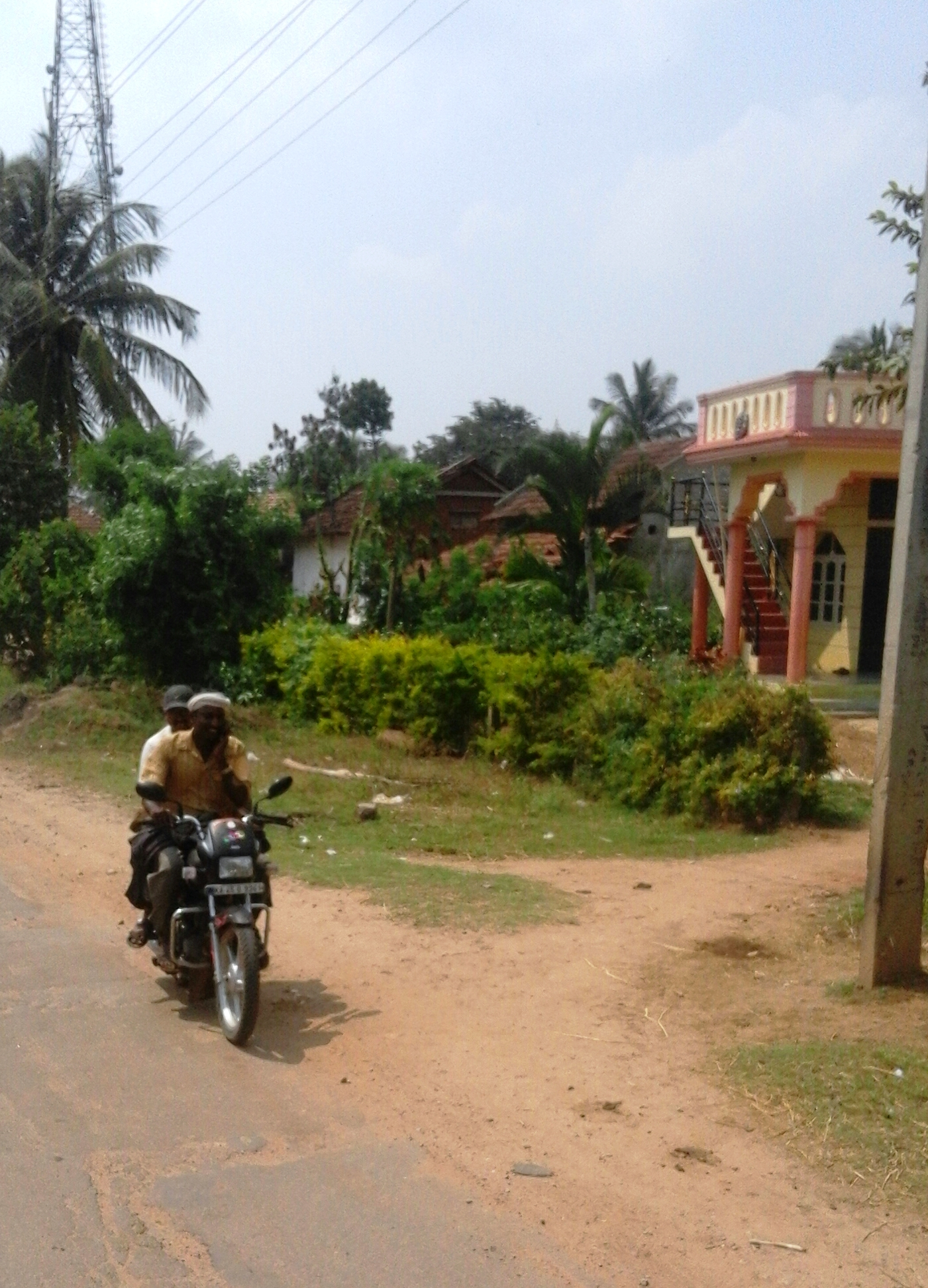
Siradanahalli

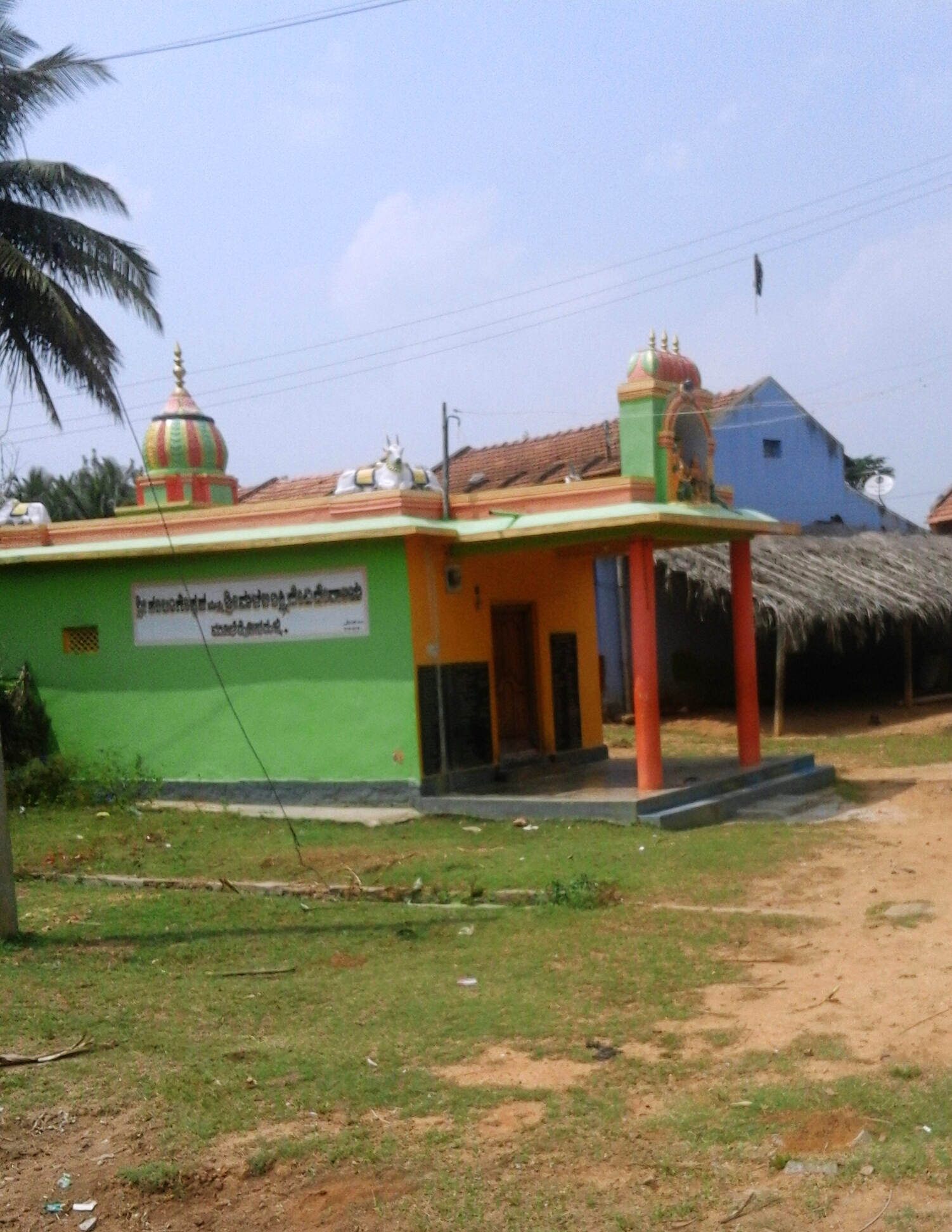
Basavapatna

== See also ==
- Saligrama, Mysore
- Kanive
- Konanur, Hassan
- Mangalore
- Kushalanagar
- Hole Narasipur
- Keralapura
