= Bettadapura =

- Village
- Location in Karnataka, India
- Country: India
- State: Karnataka
- District: Mysuru
- Taluk: Periyapatna
- Named for: Sidlu Mallikarjuna Swamy Betta (Temple)

Government
  - Body: Grama Panchayath

Area
  - Total: 9.8078 km^{2} (3.7868 sq mi)
- Elevation: 888 m (2,913 ft)

Population (2011)
  - Total: 6,356
  - Density: 648.1/km^{2} (1,678/sq mi)

Languages
  - Official: Kannada
- Time zone: UTC+5:30 (IST)
- PIN: 571102
- Vehicle registration: KA-45

Bettadapura is a village located in Mysore district, in the Indian state of Karnataka. The name is derived from two Kannada words, "Betta" and "pura". Betta means "hill" and pura means "town". As per census survey of India 2011, the location code number assigned to Bettadapura is 618171.

== Geography ==
Bettadapura is situated on State Highway 21 (Karnataka), 15 km north of Periyapatna. It is located 82 km away from the district headquarter Mysuru and 217 km from the state capital Bengaluru. Nearest railway junctions are Hassan Junction and Mysuru Junction located at a distance of 70 km & 81 km respectively. Nearest international airports are Mysore, Kannur, Mangaluru and Bengaluru located at a distance of 95 km, 113 km, 194 km & 259 km respectively.

Most of the population is from Veerashaiva Lingayatha, Gowda And Uppara (Sagara Kshatriya) community, People cultivate / farm Tobacco extensively here. The main crop is Tobacco, and the place is known for farming India's best quality tobacco which is exported to foreign countries extensively.

=== Sidlu Mallikarjuna Peak ===
The mountain is an isolated peak, not associated to any significant mountain ranges, but is a part of much older granitic rocks (Dharwar Craton). It is also the highest mountain peak in Mysore district.

Sidlu Mallikarjuna Betta
- Location within Karnataka Location within India

Highest point
- Elevation: 1,320 m (4,330 ft)above Mean Sea Level
- Coordinates: 12°27′14″N 76°06′58″E

Geography
- Location: Periyapatna Taluk, Mysuru district, Karnataka, India

Climbing
- Easiest route: Walk

== Temple ==
Bettadapura is famous for its temple.

Bettadapura has a temple on top of the hill after which the name of the town is derived or named. On the summit of the hill, there is a temple dedicated to one of the Hindu trinity deities, Lord Shiva, in the form of Mallikarjuna.

Here, Shiva is worshiped in the form of a murti (statue) and is referred to as Sidilu Mallikarjuna. Sidilu or Sidlu (Sid+ilu) is a Kannada word meaning lightning, while Mallikarjuna is another name for Lord Shiva. Legend has it that a couple had a cow which was not tied and left free to roam. All of a sudden, the cow started giving less and less milk to its owner. The owner got suspicious of this and followed the cow wherever it goes. To his astonishment, the cow started climbing the hill. He too followed without getting noticed. It reached the summit and was pouring its milk as Abhisheka on a Linga. This Linga was replaced by a human-like figure later.

One legend says that if at all any lightning strikes the temple, the bolt circles the Shiva's murti or statue for a few seconds. Another legend says that a lightning struck through a hole in the back of the temple to the completed statue of Mallikarjuna and made a dent on the scalp's occipital area/portion, which can be seen on statue even now.

Large cooking utensils carried up the hill a long time ago can still be seen, and the base of the hill has some Archaeological Survey of India (ASI) protected monuments.

There is also a Sidilu Mallikarjuna temple at the foothills, in the village of Bettadapura, which is small and plain.

Unexplained Mysteries:

Many mysteries surround this place and the place lacks experts and explanation to many questions. The local people and also few experts are not sure of many questions like why the temple was built at such a height (3300+ steps to the summit); what was the need or significance of building it at this height; how did ancient and/or medieval people even manage to build such a temple which has been fully made with hard granite blocks weighing many tonnes each; from where the granite stones were quarried (there are very few signs of ancient stone-cutting technology that can be seen beside the main temple); were the stones quarried atop hill itself and if so, how did they manage to quarry and also build on such a small place (needs to occupy stone cutters, temporary place for finished products to be placed, sculptors, labor force, tools); how did they manage to erect, lift, and place hundreds of blocks of hard granite; where is the original lingam on which the above-said cow used to pour milk (legend); why a hole was made behind the temple; what is the mythological background of this, I mean, why did the Hindu god of lightning, Indra, hit the statue which is none other than one of the most powerful gods in Hinduism, Lord Shiva; Note: Statues are seen as a living entity itself by many Hindus in Hinduism); how could Indra, being a demi-god, manage to do this.

There are few large metallic utensils inside the temple which weigh hundreds of kilos, including a very large bindige (pot used to store and transport water in India by Indian women), a large cup, and a bell (which was stolen later on). How these, which weigh many tonnes together, were carried atop the hill (since they are impossible to make it on summit); [Note: Some say the bell is in another Mallikarjuna temple situated at ground level nearby the hill]. Archaeologists think they were made to feed the pilgrims visiting that place, but they have no answer how the food was carried from below to the summit (since it is impossible to make or prepare any kind of food atop the hill).

There is a granite Nandi (bull) on top of a pillar made of granite pillar weighing many tonnes on a very small and steep granite mound lying directly opposite to the main deity, Mallikarjuna. Almost all Lord Shiva's temple will have a Nandi in front of it. Here too, amazingly, the Nandi sits just directly opposite to the main temple which is at least 200 meters in distance. According to a legend, the Nandi was chased by a tiger and the Nandi reached the summit and was near this mound. It jumped on the pillar and sat on the pillar to save its life. We can see the carved hooves etched on the granite stone below the mound and also near the pillar atop of this mound. How did ancient people managed to transfer both pillar and Nandi above this small, windy, & steep mound; how did the ancients manage to balance the height of Nandi by placing the pillar, which is more than 8 feet, to sync exactly at 180 degrees or directly opposite to the main deity of the temple that is at least 200 meters far away on highest (main) granite mound.

There are few carvings and inscriptions on few stairs/steps and many are not sure of their significance.

There is a huge granite slab weighing at least 200-300 kilos in the main temple with ancient Kannada inscriptions on it. Unfortunately, this is not so clear.

There are some ancient Kannada inscriptions [Halegannada (Hale+Kannada) hale means ancient/old] below the pillar and the Nandi; which is not so clear.

There is a Kalyani, a pond with greenish water said to be always present across all seasons, and it is believed that water somehow emerged from that place just likeTalakaveri making it holy/sacred. Some people also drink it believing it brings good fortune. Many are not sure how water is emerging there or is this just a rainwater stocking in some accidentally naturally occurring pond-like structure. If so, why it remains almost the same in all seasons is also not clear.

There is a small granite structure that looks like some miniature bathtub suitable for infants.

There is a Mantapa built using granite slabs just around few hundreds of steps from below wherein the deity is missing. Locals are not sure if that was a temple (of which deity?) and the deity was destroyed (if so, by whom?) or the statue was stolen (if so, by whom?).

There are four elephant statues, two on front and back, built at the base of the Gopura (sanctum) near the beginning of the stairs or steps to the temple which is said to be made recently by one of Yadhu vamsha kings (clan of Wodeyar/King of Mysuru dynasty) of Mysore or Wodeyar dynasty because the first elephant(Jayamarthanda elephant) that lifted the Ambaari, (a 700 kg gold howdah that is displayed and taken on procession on an elephant on the occasion of world-famous 9 to 10-day Dasara festival that is celebrated across Karnataka, grandly in the cultural city, Mysore), was taken from this area (Bettadapura).

There are 2 huge granite obelisks of around 30 feet tall (from the ground-level) at the beginning of the stairs to the hill, which easily weigh around 15-20,000 kilos each, and are placed in a pi-symbol-like format using a granite slab on these two obelisks. Many are not sure who made this and why, and how much feet it goes below the ground level to support its immense height and weight. There is a belief that if at all anyone manages to place a small stone on the horizontal stone slab placed on the obelisks, then their wishes will be fulfilled. A similar structure is also seen after few steps up on the stairway to the summit, but it is a very small one (around 8–10 feet tall).

There is a huge dug-up well nearby the basement of the hill that has a huge hard rock slanted slightly on one of its sides. If you throw any kind of stone onto it, the stone you throw will break into some pieces for sure. This might be due to gravity, as the slanted rock is a few feet below the ground-level from where the stones are thrown.

There is also a huge two-directional monolithic carved statue of Hindu god, Hanuman, son of Vaayu, who is the Hindu god of air/wind, situated in the same hill but at just 100 steps or so on the left side of the main stairs to the hill summit. This statue easily weighs around 15-20,000 kilos. The Hanuman is carved with keeping a Hindu legend in mind from one of the greatest and famous epics ever written, Ramayana, wherein the Hanuman becomes huge and places Lord Vishnu's avatar Rama on his shoulders while doing warfare with levitating Lanka king, Ravana on his Vimāna to the level of RAvaNA's vimAna.

One of the unusual things noticeable, probably only here, is Hanuman is carved or depicted with right canine teeth (The statue depicts right side pose of Hanuman).

There is a Linga in front of the Hanuman mandir (temple), which is very unusual and probably the only place in the world because Linga is associated with Lord Shiva and Hanuman is associated with Lord Rama.

There is one more granite Linga outside of Hanuman mandir (temple), which has a 2x4-inch hole through which head of Lord Ganesha has been carved inside almost to the center/middle portion of the Linga. This is one of its kind find nowhere else, probably.

Another unusual thing is a few depictions of Lord Vishnu's Dashavatara, viz., Matsya, Kurma, Varaha, etc.,

There is also a depiction of Durga, (one of the avatars or forms of Devi Parvati, Lord Shiva's consort/wife), carved on a granite stone a few feet beside the Hanuman temple.

There is also a cave below this temple at few feet below, which has a very short suranga marga (a secret chamber/hole/pathway to escape) that leads to the temple basement or entrance. One person at a time can crawl through this hole. There is another cave beside the statue with adequate space to sleep and/or meditate.

It is also not clear how did ancient people manage to transfer this rock from another place (because it is imperfectly or randomly cut behind the carving and NOT sliced properly from a huge stone), cut this huge monolithic stone so precisely flat on one side, carve a huge Hanuman over it, and erected or lifted this 15-20,000-kilo stone to exactly 90 degrees from ground level.

Modern-day Mystery: There was a rumor of alien and/or UFO sighting recently in Periyapatna Taluk around November 2015. Refer to the below link for details. https://kannada.oneindia.com/news/mysore/did-aliens-appear-again-in-piriyapatna-mysuru-103127.html (This is in Kannada language and you need to translate to your preferred language or utilize the help of a Kannada language interpreter).

Other details of the place: For further info, please also read the below articles:

- http://asibengalurucircle.in/sidilu-mallikarjuna-temple-bettadapura
- http://www.thelightbaggage.com/2013/06/bettadapura-village-with-rich-history.html
- https://bangaloremirror.indiatimes.com/columns/others/triptease-lost-in-legend/articleshow/46125085.cms
- https://kannada.oneindia.com/news/mysore/tibetans-are-devotees-sidlu-mallikarjuna-temple-bettadapura-105804.html (This is in Kannada language and you need to translate to your preferred language or utilize the help of a Kannada language interpreter).
