= State Highway 85 (Karnataka) =

Road in Karnataka, India

State Highway 85

Route information
- Maintained by Karnataka Road Development Corporation Limited
- Length: 346.28 km (215.17 mi)

Major junctions
- East end: Bengaluru
- West end: Jalsoor

Location
- Country: India
- State: Karnataka
- Districts: Bengaluru Urban, Ramanagara, Tumakuru, Mandya, Mysuru, Hassan, Kodagu, Dakshina Kannada
- Primary destinations: Bengaluru, Thavarekere, Magadi, Nagamangala, Ramanathapura, Somwarpet, Bisle Reserve Forest, Kukke Subramanya

Highway system
- Roads in India; Expressways; National; State; Asian; State Highways in Karnataka

State Highway 85 (SH-85) is a state highway connecting Bengaluru of Bangalore Urban district and Jalsoor village of Dakshina Kannada, in the South Indian state of Karnataka. It has a total length of 346.28 kilometres (215.17 mi).

SH-85 is one of the longest state highways, passing through eight districts in the state of Karnataka. It is one of the three highways (other two being NH-75 and NH-275/SH-88) connecting Bengaluru to Dakshina Kannada.

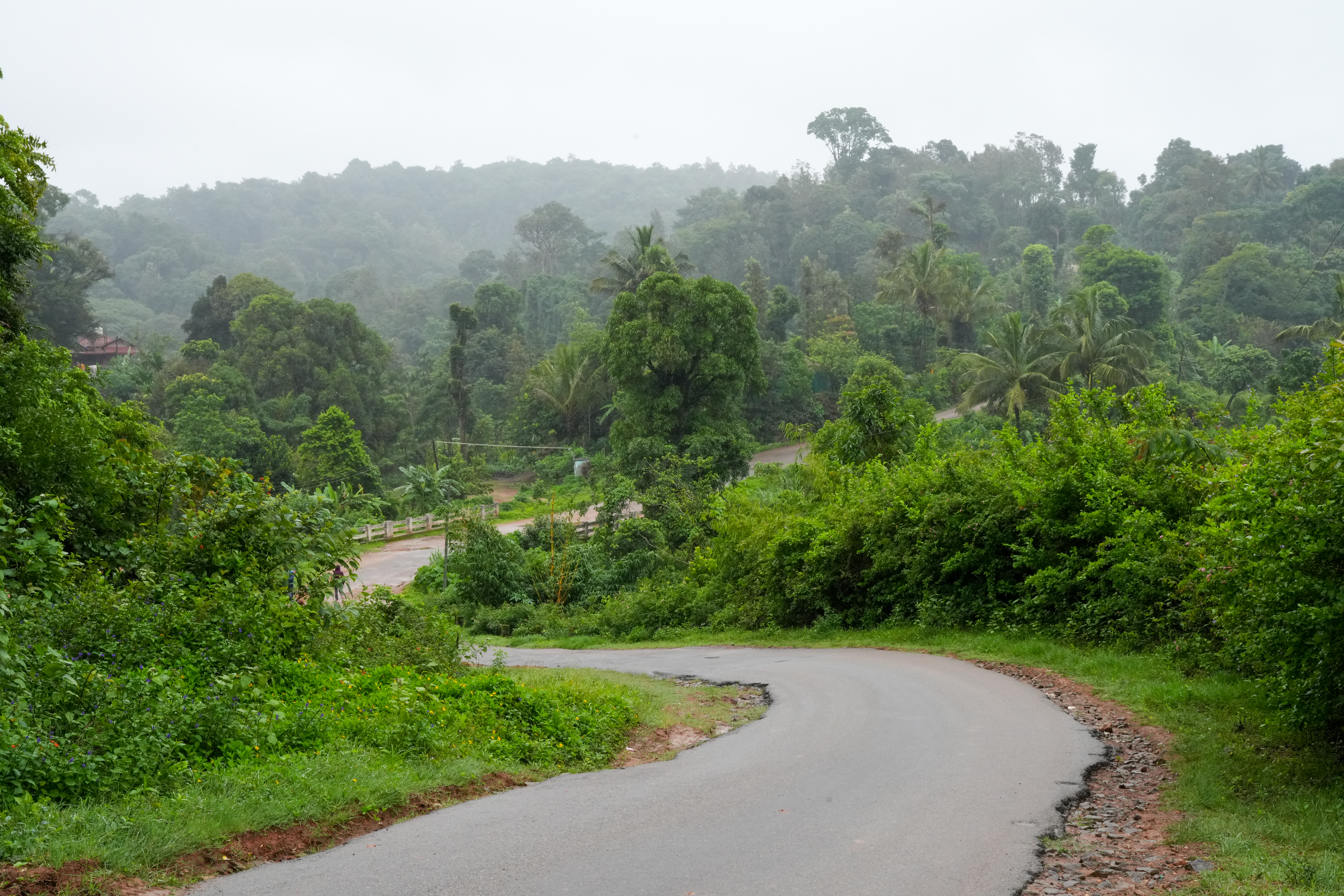
SH-85 near Inakanahalli northwest of Somwarpet (ca. June 2024)

Major towns and villages on the highway are (from east to west): Srigandha Kaval (Magadi Road, Bengaluru), Sunkadakatte, Kadabagere, Seegehalli, Thavarekere, Gangappanahalli, Tippagondanahalli Reservoir, Magadi, Huliyurdurga, Sugganahalli, Kowdle, Nagamangala, Bogadi santhe, Krishnaraja Pete, Akkihebbal, Bherya, Saligrama, Keralapura, Basavapattana, Ramanathapura, Konanur, Siddapura Gate, Gonimaruru, Somwarpet, Tholur Shettalli, Koothi, Kudrasthe, Vanagoor, Patla, Hadlagadde, Bisle, Bisle Reserve Forest, Kukke Subramanya, Nellur and Jalsoor.

Under KSHIP-III (Karnataka State Highways Improvement Project), this highway is being expanded into a proper two-lane carriageway (with paved shoulders) from Somwarpet to Magadi and four-lane carriageway from Magadi to Bengaluru.
