= Mirle =

- Village
- Location in Karnataka, India Mirle (India)
- Coordinates: 12°32′N 76°19′E
- Country: India
- State: Karnataka
- District: Mysore
- Talukas: Saligrama

Government
  - Body: Gram panchayat

Area
  - Total: 15.7643 km^{2} (6.0866 sq mi)
- Elevation: 796 m (2,612 ft)

Population (2011)
  - Total: 5,845
  - Density: 370.8/km^{2} (960.3/sq mi)

Languages
  - Official: Kannada
- Time zone: UTC+5:30 (IST)
- ISO 3166 code: IN-KA
- Vehicle registration: KA-45
- Website: karnataka.gov.in

Mirle is a village in the southern state of Karnataka, India. It is located in the Saligrama taluk of Mysore district.

When persecuted by the Chola king Kulottunga, Ramanujacharya is said to have fled the Chola country and first stayed at Vahnipushkarini, the place now known as Mirle from where he moved on to Saligrama.

== Demographics ==
As of 2001 India census, Mirle had a population of 6075 with 3015 males and 3060 females.

== See also ==
- Saligrama, Mysore
- Mysore
- Districts of Karnataka
