= Konanur, Hassan =

Konanur Kolaluru
- Village
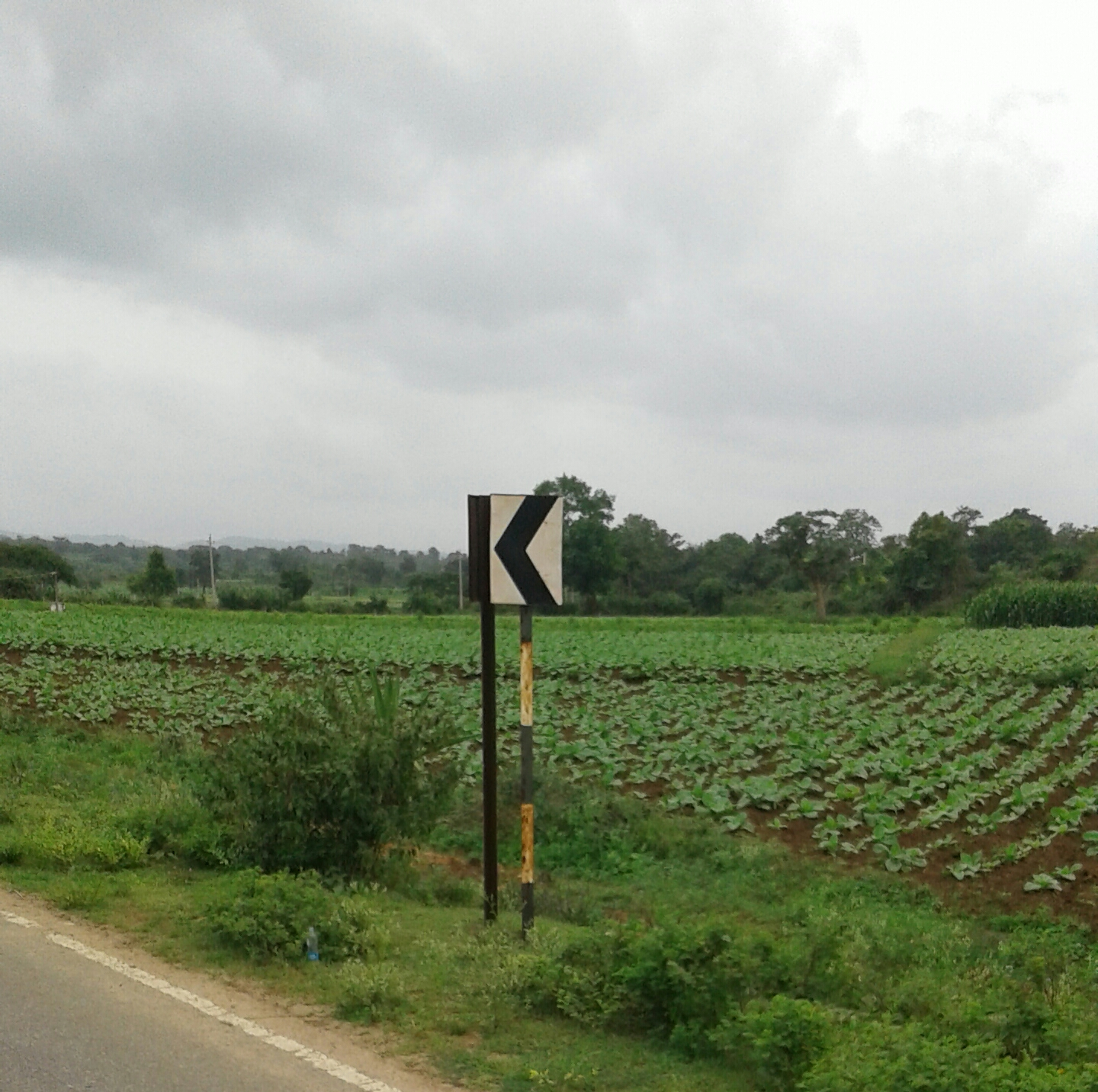
- Konanur

- Location in Karnataka, India Konanur (India)
- Coordinates: 12°38′N 76°03′E
- Country: India
- State: Karnataka
- District: Hassan
- Taluk: Arkalgud
- Named for: Sri Kolalu gopalakrishna temple is located in the centre of town

Government
  - Body: Grama panchayath

Area
  - Total: 4.8286 km^{2} (1.8643 sq mi)
- Elevation: 825 m (2,707 ft)

Population (2011)
  - Total: 8,032
  - Rank: 8th in Hassan
  - Density: 1,663/km^{2} (4,308/sq mi)

Languages
  - Official: Kannada
- Time zone: UTC+5:30 (IST)
- Postal code: 573130
- Vehicle registration: KA-13

Konanur is a mid level town in the southern state of Karnataka, India. It is located in the Arkalgud taluk of Hassan district in Karnataka.

== Demographics ==
As of 2001 India census, Konanur had a population of roughly 9702 with 4890 males and 4812 females, konanur is located on the shore of river cauvery and it is located in state highway SH-85 and SH-91 in border of hassan district as triangular border it covers from kodagu and mysore districts. Konanur received 3 times (2018, 2019, 2022) Gandhi gram award from state government.

State second largest hanging bridge was constructed in river cauvery to create connectivity between Kattepura and Konanur, Arasikatte Amma temple is the famous temple near by Konanur, many of other temples are there in the town like Kottala Ganapati temple, Bhavani shankari temple, Kolalugopala Krishna temple, Shiva temple, Basaveshwara Temple, kumbaleshwara temple and many more and it has a good bus connectivity from Hassan, Mysore, Bengaluru, Kushalanagar and Madikeri.

== Image gallery ==
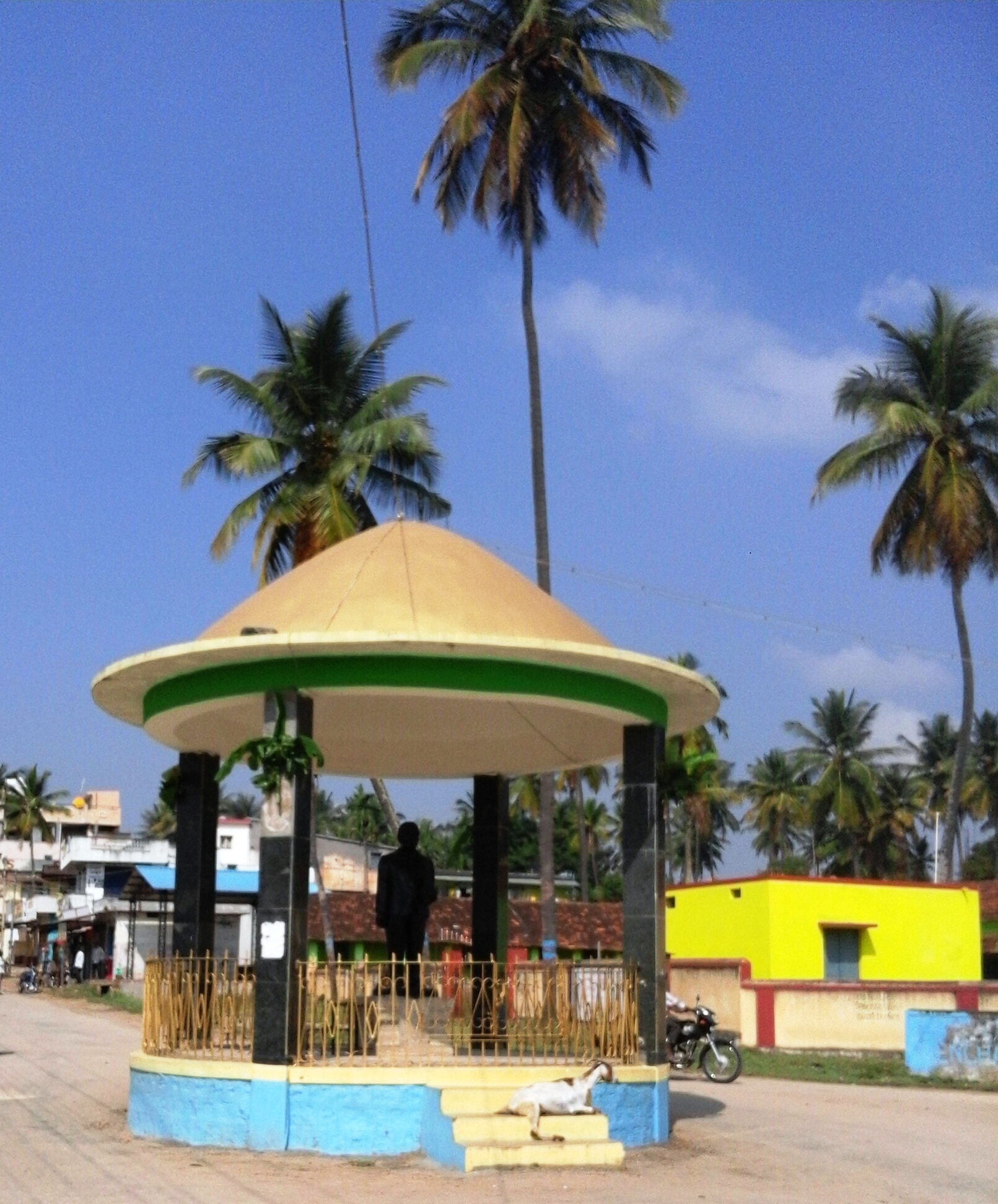
Ambedkar Circle

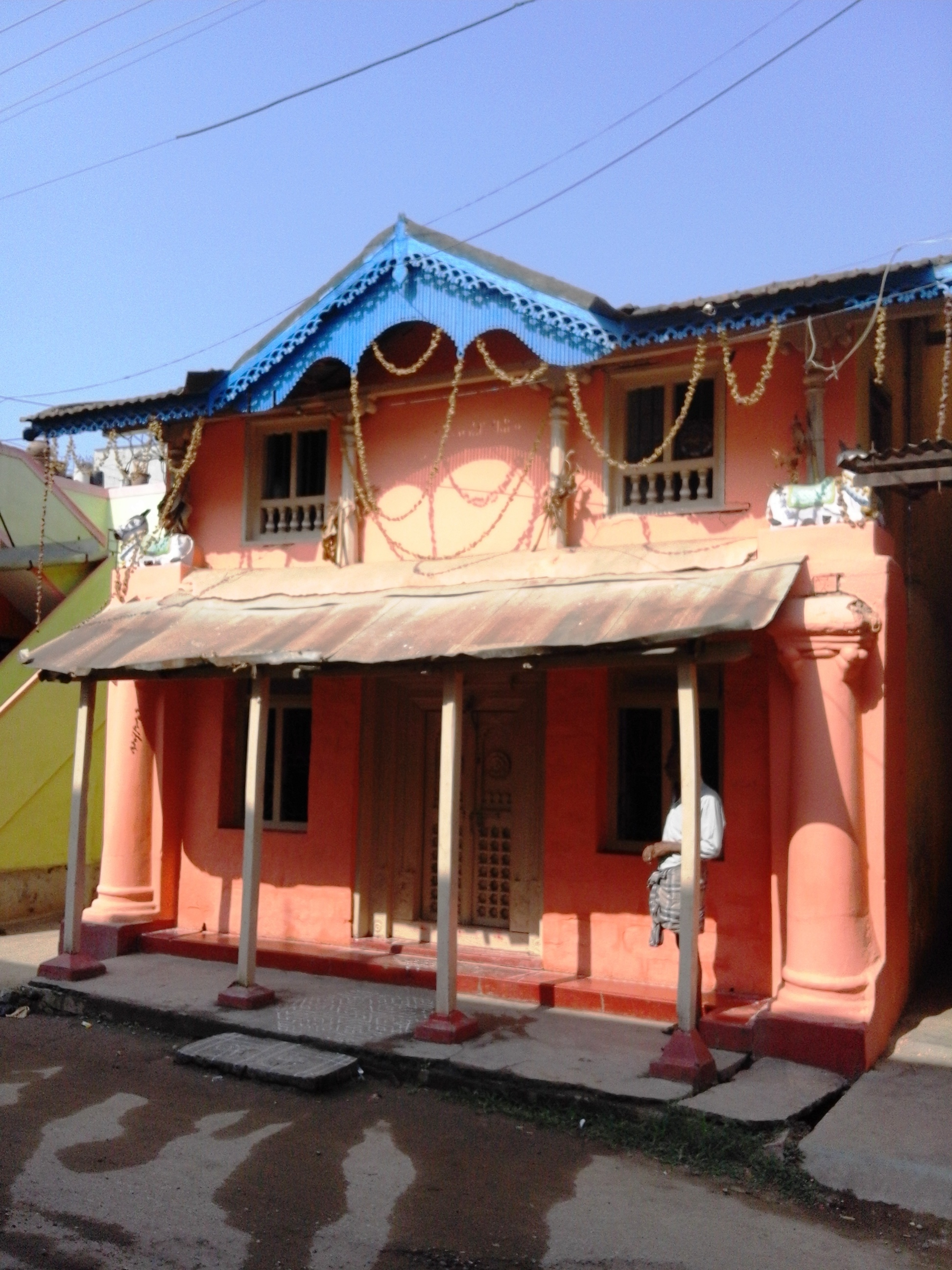
Kumbaleshwara temple

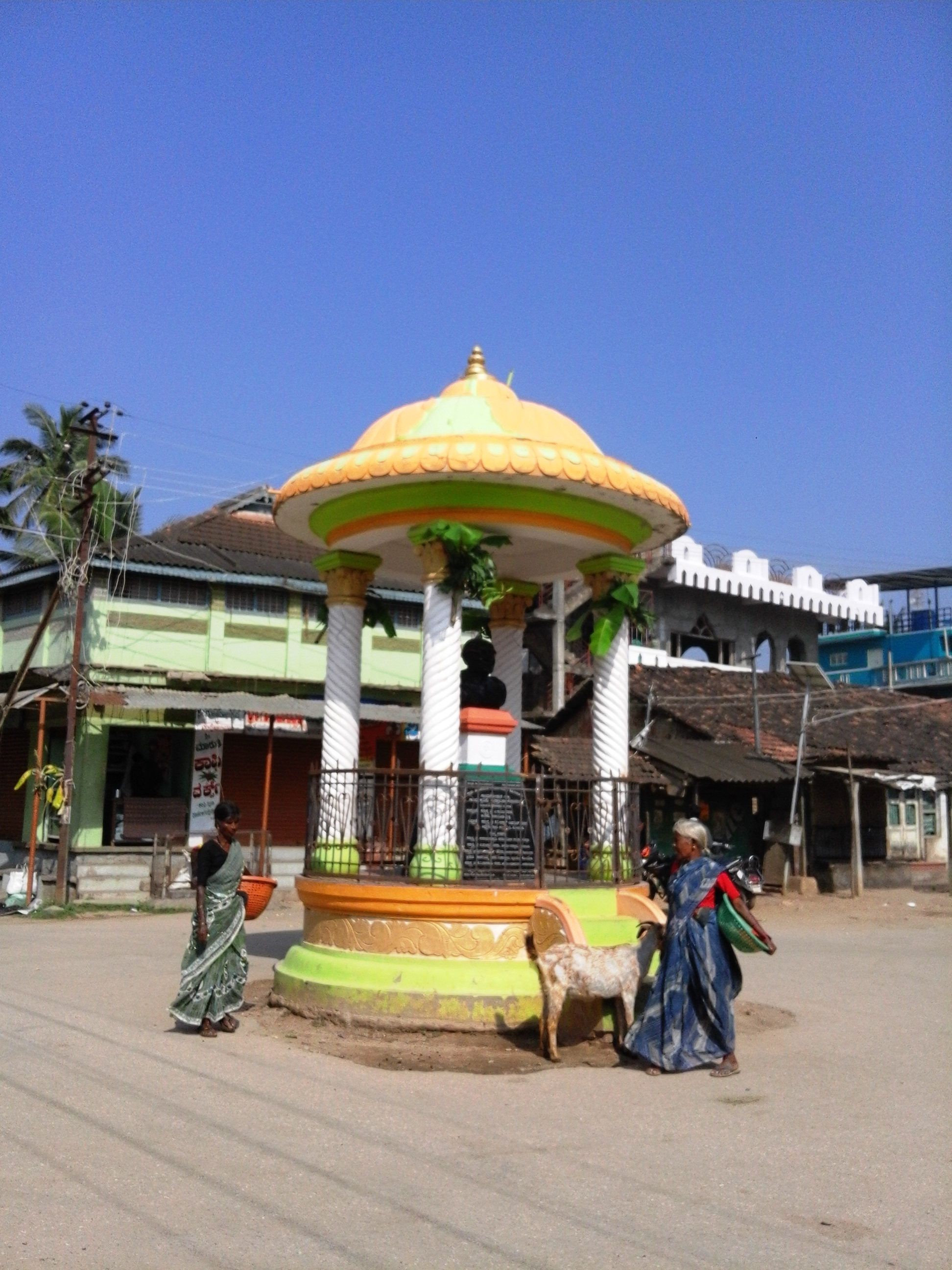
Gandhi circle

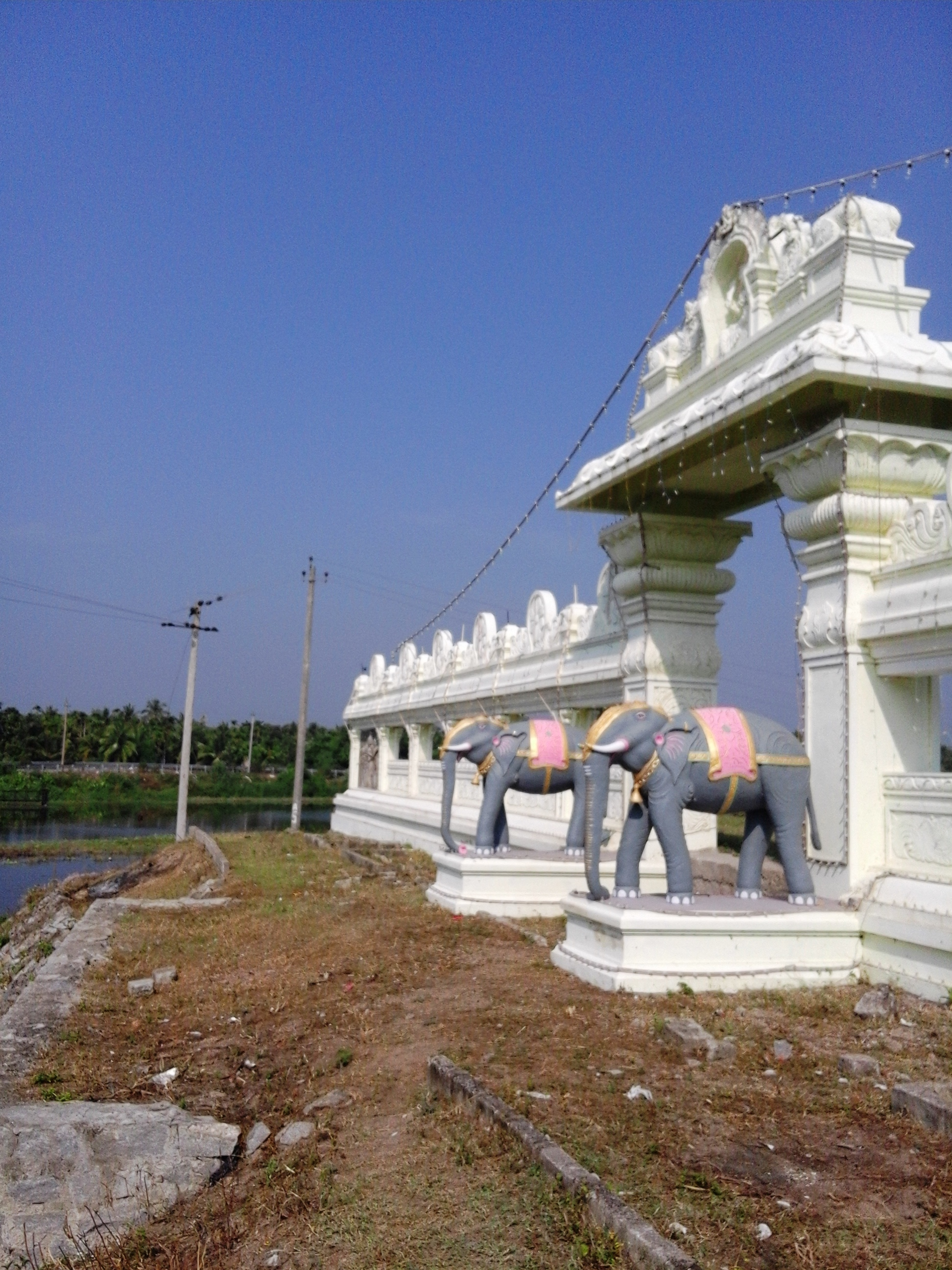
KereKkudiamma Temple

Villages of konanuru

- Doddabommenahalli
- Chikkabommenhalli
- Siddapura gate
- Banugondi
- Ullenahalli
- Siddapura
- Handrangi
- Shigodu
- Arasikatte Kaval
- Chikkahalli
- Kerekodi
- Kaduvina Hosahalli
- Kesavatthur
- Bidarur

== See also ==
- Saligrama. Mysore
- Holenarasipura
- Mangalore
- Arkalgud
