= Holenarasipura =

Holenarasipura Hole Narsipura
- Town
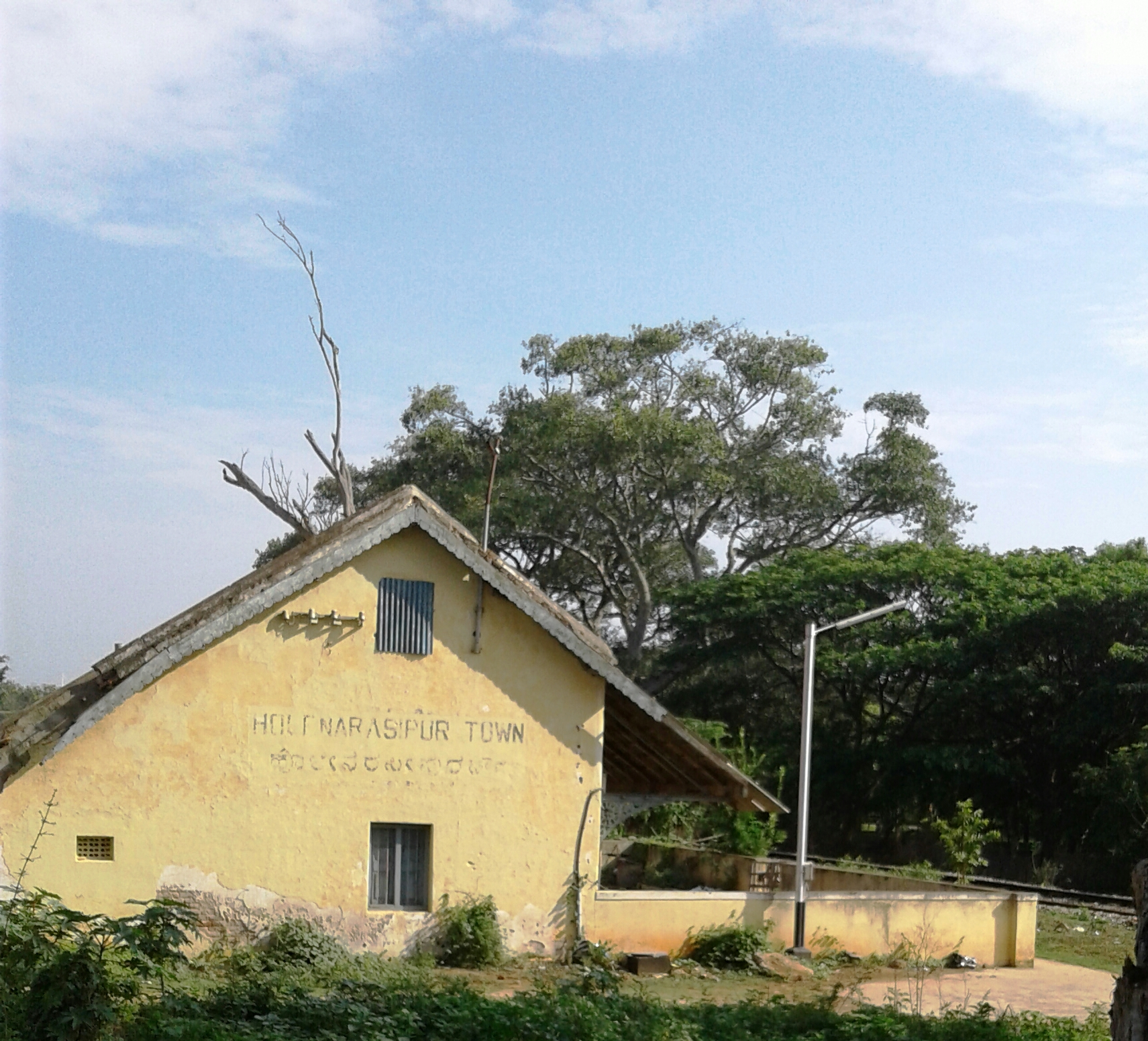
- Old Railway Station

- Location in Karnataka, India
- Coordinates: 12.783°N 76.243°E
- Country: India
- State: Karnataka
- District: Hassan
- Region: Bayaluseeme

Government
  - Type: Town Municipal Council
  - MLA: H. D. Revanna

Area
  - Town: 7.38 km^{2} (2.85 sq mi)
  - Rural: 541.75 km^{2} (209.17 sq mi)
- Elevation: 849 m (2,785 ft)

Population (2011)
  - Town: 29,938
  - Density: 4,060/km^{2} (10,500/sq mi)
  - Rural: 152,213

Languages
  - Official: Kannada
- Time zone: UTC+5:30 (IST)
- PIN: 573 211
- Telephone code: +91-8175
- ISO 3166 code: IN-KA
- Vehicle registration: KA-13
- Website: www.holenarasipurtown.mrc.gov.in/en

Holenarasipura is a historic town and taluk in Hassan district of Karnataka. The town is situated on the banks of the Hemavati River, one of the tributaries of the Kaveri.

== History ==
Holenarsipura is named after the Hemavathi River (Hole) and Lord Narasimha (Nara). Its origin dates back to the Hoysala empire. Local Palegars (Nayakas) ruled this place from 1547 to 1667. Kanteerava Narasaraja Wadeyar, the king of Mysore defeated the local chieftain Narasimha Nayaka and it became the part of Wadiyar dynasty.

== Geography ==
Holenarsipura sits along the banks of the Hemavathi River, a Tributary of the Kaveri River at an average elevation of 855 meters (2,805 ft) above sea level. Located in the southern part of Hassan district, Distance between Holenarsipura and Hassan is 29km. Taluk features a tropical semi-arid to transitional climate with average temperatures from 21°C to 32°C, and moderate rainfall. Major crops include paddy, ragi, coconut, sugarcane and pulses.

== Demographics ==
As of 2011 India census, Holenarasipura had a population of 29,938. Males constitute 51% of the population and females 49%. It has an average literacy rate of 73%, higher than the national average of 59.5%, with male literacy of 78% and female literacy of 68%. 11% of the population is under 6 years of age.

== Places of interest ==
- Sri Lakshmi Narasimha Temple: A 16th century architectural landmark featuring three sanctums dedicated to Lord Lakshmi Narasimha, Venugopala and Chennakeshava.
- Neminatha Basadi: An ancient Jain heritage site dating back to 915 A.D. built by Chavundaraya, known for housing a rare idol of Goddess Padmavathi.
- Shri Ramadevara Katte: It is a 150 year old checkdam and prominent scenic attraction built across the Hemavathi River. Originally built by the Maharaja of Mysore with the assistance of British engineers.
- Mavinakere Shri Bettada Ranganatha- swamy Temple: A hill-top shrine offering panoramic views of surrounding green landscapes, windmills and countryside. The temple is dedicated to the Lord Ranganatha (Vishnu).
- Mosale Twin Temple: The temple complex features two nearly identical 12th century Hoysala structures- The Nageshwara Temple and the Chennakeshava (Vishnu) Temple. Located in Mosale village about 14 km from Hassan city.

== Gallery ==
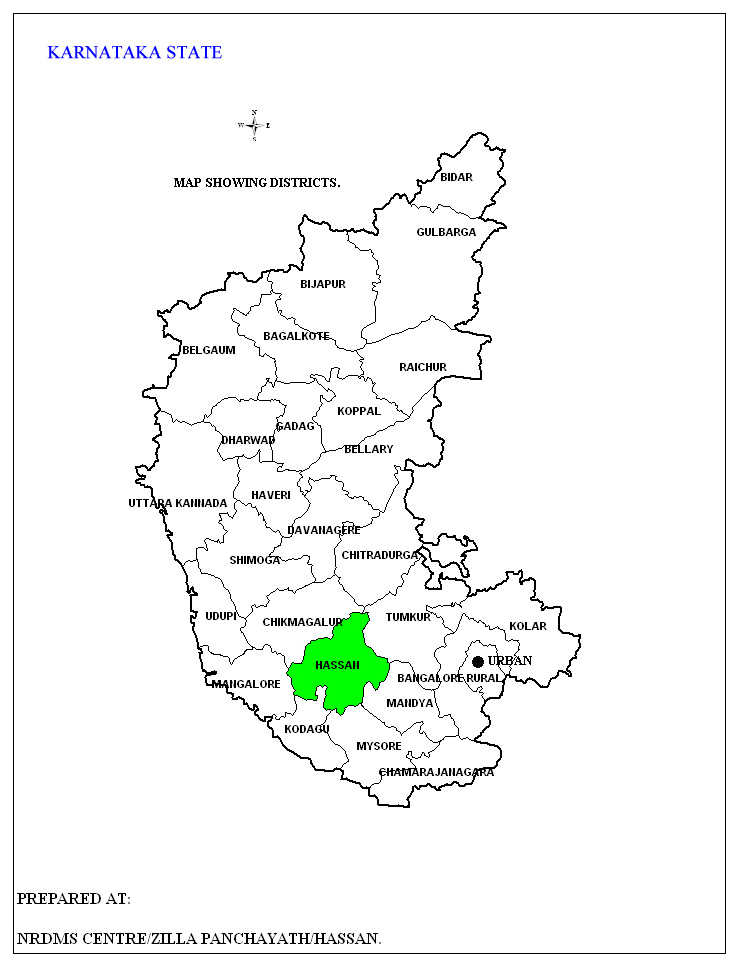
Positioning of Hassan district in Karnataka

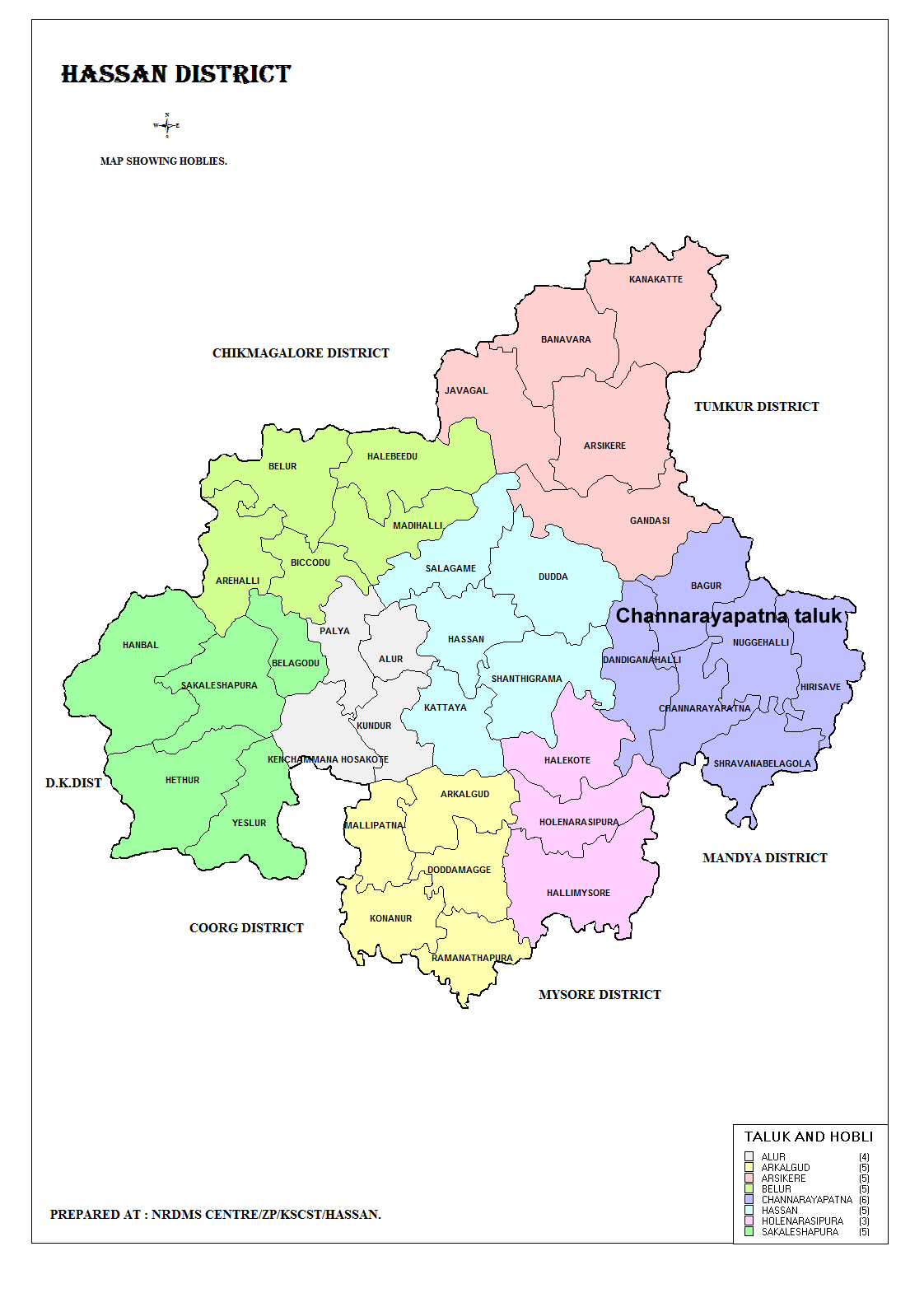
Hobli Map of Hassan district

Map of Holenarasipura Taluk as per 2001 Census

Map of Holenarasipura Taluk as per 2011 Census

Holenarasipura Taluk - Hobli and Village Map

Holenarasipura Taluk - Grama Panchayat and Village Map

Holenarasipura Taluk Map about Fluoride content in DWS

== Notable people ==
- Satchidanandendra Saraswati, philosopher, Advaita and Vedanta thinker.
- H. D. Deve Gowda, former Prime Minister.
- K. S. Ashwath, Kannada actor.

== See also ==
- Saligrama, Mysore
- Ramanathapura
- Arkalgud
- Mangalore
- Keralapura
- Govindanahalli
- Kikkeri
- Panchalingeshwara Temple, Govindanahalli
