= Arkalgud =

Arakalagudu
- Town
- Location in Karnataka, India
- Coordinates: 12.77°N 76.06°E
- Country: India
- State: Karnataka
- District: Hassan
- Region: Malenadu/Bayaluseeme
- Named for: Arakeshwara

Government
  - Body: Town Panchayath

Area
  - Town: 2.37 km^{2} (0.92 sq mi)
  - Rural: 666.65 km^{2} (257.40 sq mi)
- Elevation: 918 m (3,012 ft)

Population (2011)
  - Town: 16,810
  - Density: 7,090/km^{2} (18,400/sq mi)
  - Rural: 187,775

Languages
  - Official: Kannada
- Time zone: UTC+5:30 (IST)
- Postal code: 573102
- Vehicle registration: KA-13, KA-46
- Website: http://www.arkalgudtown.mrc.gov.in

Arkalgud, also known as Arakalagudu, is a panchayat town and is one among the eight taluks of Hassan district in the state of Karnataka, India. It is situated 30 km from Hassan, 181 km from Mangalore and 195 km from Bangalore. The Hemavati River forms the entire northern boundary of the Taluk, river Kaveri runs through a portion of the south. It is well connected by road to many towns and cities of Karnataka. Hassan Junction railway station is the nearest major railway station and Kannur International Airport is the nearest airport at 150 kilometres.

== History ==
It is said that Gautama rishi performed penance to Surya (Sun God) and installed the idol of Arakeshwara, the presiding deity of the local Arakeshwara temple and the town was originally called Arkapuri (city of an image of Arkeshwara, the presiding deity). Hence the name Arkalgud came into existence. It was founded by Krishnappa Nayaka, one of the Aigur (Balam) chiefs in 1568 A.D. It was then captured by Kanthirava Narasaraja I of Mysore in 1647 A.D., it was retaken subsequently by Keladi Shivappa Nayaka of Ikkeri and finally in 1694 by Chikkadevaraja Wodeyar (1673–1704) of Mysore.

== Geography and salient features ==
Arkalgud is located at 12.77°N 76.06°E. It has an average elevation of 918 m (3,012 ft). It lies partly in malnad and partly in maidan (Plain) tract. The total geographical area of the Taluk is 675 km^{2} (261 sq mi). It occupies sixth place in the District in terms of geographical area. The soil is red sandy derived from granites, gneiss and schists. The soil is red to brownish in colour, shallow to fairly deep shallow, loamy to sandy loamy in texture intermixed with fairly large amounts of coarse gravel and pebbles. They are well drained but poor in bases and water holding capacity. It is favourable for growing crops like paddy, sugarcane, coconut, potato, vegetables and plantation crops under irrigated conditions. It is suitable for growing ragi, millets, pulses, groundnut, potato and maize under rain-fed conditions. The river Kaveri enters at Kodavinahosahalli, a village in the south of Arkalgud and flows only through a small portion of about 24 km and enters Mysore district. An Anicut called Krishnarajakatte has been constructed across the river in the Taluk from which two channels viz. Kattepura channel and Ramanathapura channel take off for a length of about 24 km and 30 km respectively. The Kattepura channel runs along the south bank, past Rudrapatna; and the Ramanathapura Channel along the north bank past Konanur and Ramanathapura to Basavapatna. The river Hemavati divides Arakalgud and Hassan taluks. The river enters in Honnathapura in the western side and flows towards to east and enters Holenarasipura taluk. The taluk receives rainfall from south-west monsoon. It is located at around 3,085 feet (940 m) above sea level. This taluk enjoys dry and cold climate during the year as the central part of the Taluk borders the Malenadu region and south-eastern portions form the southern maidan region. One can find some low hilly regions in the taluk as well as high altitude region such as Hippi-betta (3486 ft. or 1063 meters) in the western portion of the taluk. Konanur is the largest village in the taluk Basavapatna is one of the other village of Arakalgud taluk and Lakshmikanthaswamy temple is situated and Ramanathapura temples are famous in the same taluk every year one month jatra will be celebrated here.

SH-21 and SH-8 pass through the town of Arakalgudu.

== Nearest places to visit ==
- Shri Prasanna Subramanya-swamy Temple, Ramanathapura: It is a prominent 17th century holy shrine dedicated to Lord Subramanya swamy, located in Ramanatha-pura, Arkalgud taluk. Situated on the banks of the river Kaveri and famous for serpent dosha rituals and ancient structures.
- Shri Rameshwara Temple, Ramanatha pura: The temple stands on the bank of Kaveri River which is a prominent pilgrimage spot. The temple is a Ekakuta Hoysala style temple with Hoysala Crest. The temple is dedicated to Lord Shiva.
- Rudra-patna: Known as village of music and famous for its Tamboori-shaped musical temple located approximately 26.5 km away from Arkalgud.
- Hanging Bridge: The Konanuru Hanging Bridge also known as the Katte-pura Hanging Bridge, is the second largest hanging bridge in Karnataka. Built across the river Kaveri. It connects Konanur and Katte-pura village, roughly 5 km from Ramanatha pura.
- Katte-pura Check-dam: Katte-pura is a scenic, 17th century old check-dam built across the Kaveri River. It is located in Katte-pura village. Believed to be the very first check-dam constructed over the Kaveri River, built by Wadeyars of Mysore, around 9 km from Ramanatha pura.

== Demographics ==
As per the 2011 census, The Arkalgud town had a total population of 16,810. For the broader Arkalgud taluk (which includes rural villages and tehsils), The population was recorded at 2,04,585. Arkalgud has an average literacy rate of 65%, higher than the national average of 59.5%; with 57% of the males and 43% of females literate. 12% of the population is under 6 years of age.

== Gallery ==
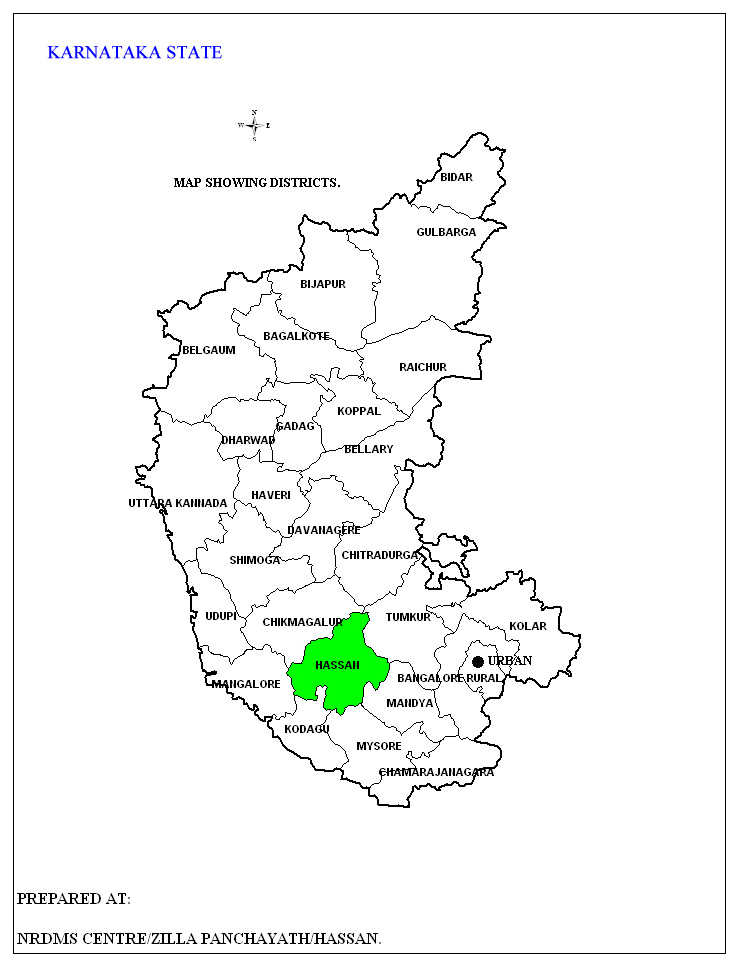
Positioning of Hassan district in Karnataka

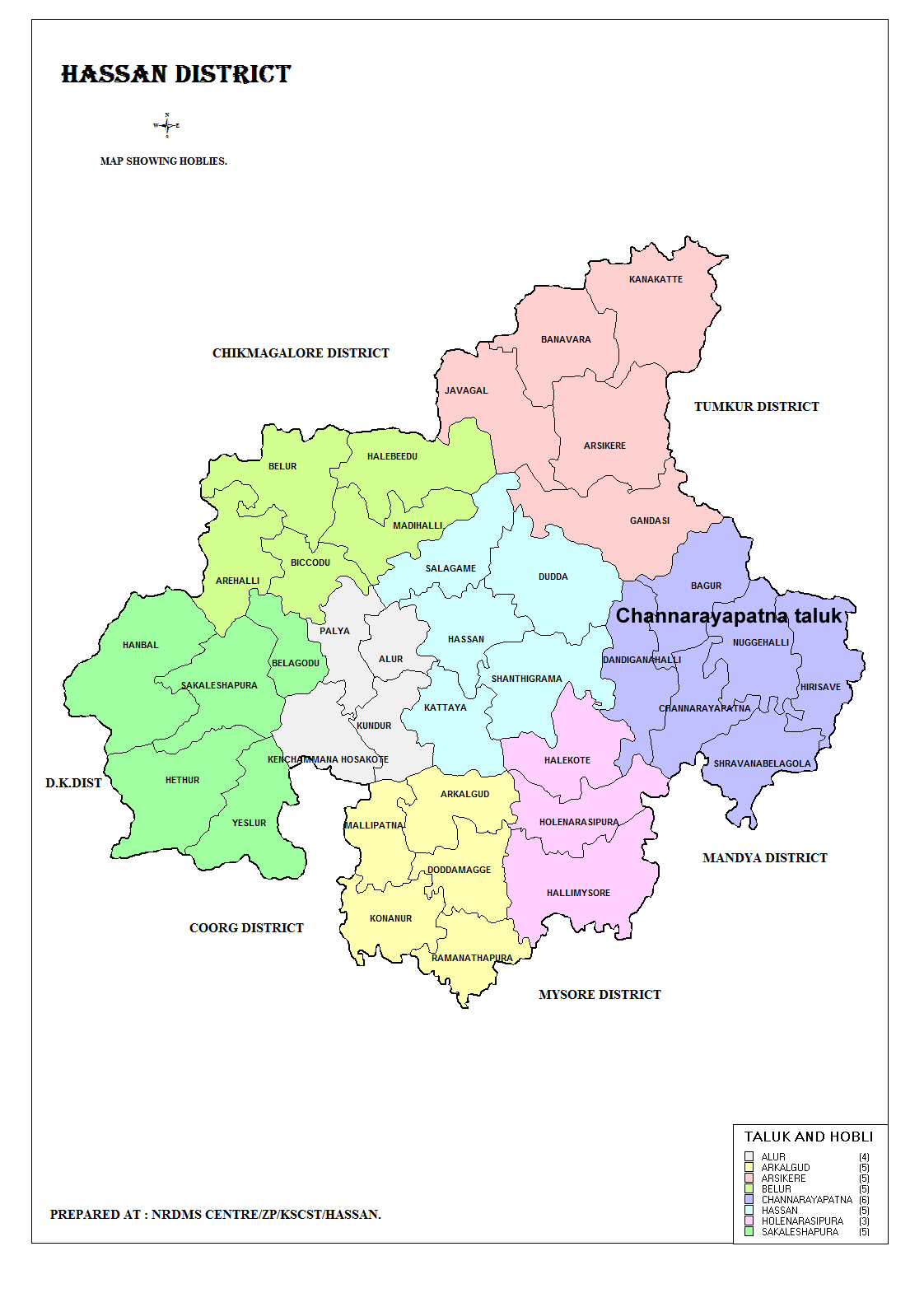
Hobli Map of Hassan district

Map of Arakalgud Taluk as per 2001 Census

Map of Arakalgud Taluk as per 2011 Census

Arakalgud Taluk - Hobli and Village Map

Arakalgud Taluk - Grama Panchayat and Village Map

Arakalgud Taluk Map about Fluoride content in DWS
