= Hebbal =

Hebbal may refer to several places in Karnataka, India:

- Hebbal, Bengaluru, a neighborhood in Bengaluru
  - Hebbal Lake, Bengaluru
  - Hebbal Assembly constituency
  - Sindhi High School, Hebbal
- Hebbal, Mysore, a neighborhood in Mysore
  - Hebbal Lake, Mysore
- Hebbal, Hukkeri, a village in Belagavi district
- Hebbal, Khanapur, a village in Belagavi district
- Hebbal, Bijapur, a village in Bijapur district

== See also ==
- Akkihebbal, a village in Krishnarajpet Taluk, Mandya district
- Hebballi (disambiguation)
- Hebbal-Kittayya inscription
