= SDVS Sangh =

Indian educational organisation

Shri Duradundeshwar Vidya Samvardhak Sangh (SDVS Sangh) is an organization that runs several educational institutions in the town of Sankeshwar in the state of Karnataka in India. It established its first school, Shri Duradundeshwar Lajapatraya High School, in 1929. In 1964, the organization was registered as an "SDE Society" under the Societies Registration Act.

== List of schools ==
The following institutions are grouped as managed by SVDS Sangh:

- Shri Duradundeshwar Lajapatraya High School, Sankeshwar (1929)
- Shri D.L. Khot Composite Pre-university College, Hebbal (1959)
- T.P.C Balamandir, Sankeshwar (1960)
- Shri Appangouda Patil Vidya Mandir, Kanagala (1965)
- Balamandir Hira Sugar Colony, Sankeshwar (1965)
- Shri L.B. Sardesai Comp, Pre-university College, Yadgud (1966)
- Akkamahadevi Kanya Shale, Sankeshwar (1966)
- S.S. Arts College and T.P. Science Institute, Sankeshwar (1967)
- Shri L.K. Khot College of Commerce, Sankeshwar (1970)
- Shri Sidagouda S. Patil English Medium School, Sankeshwar (1971)
- Pre-Primary English Medium School, Sankeshwar (1991)
- Kannada and Marathi Convent Primary School, Sankeshwar (1993)
- B.B.A. College, Sankeshwar (1996)
- Arts, Science & Commerce P.U. College, Sankeshwar (2001)
- Pre-University Women's College, Sankeshwar (2006)
- BSW College, Sankeshwar (2006)
- BCA College, Sankeshwar (2007)
- Annapurna Institute of Management Studies, Sankeshwar (2009)
