= Jakkur inscriptions and hero stones =

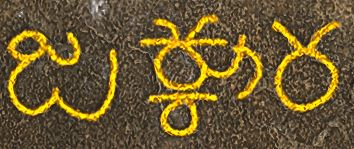
Detail from the Jakkur 1342 CE Honnamarayanayaka Donation Inscription showing the engraved name 'Jakkūra'

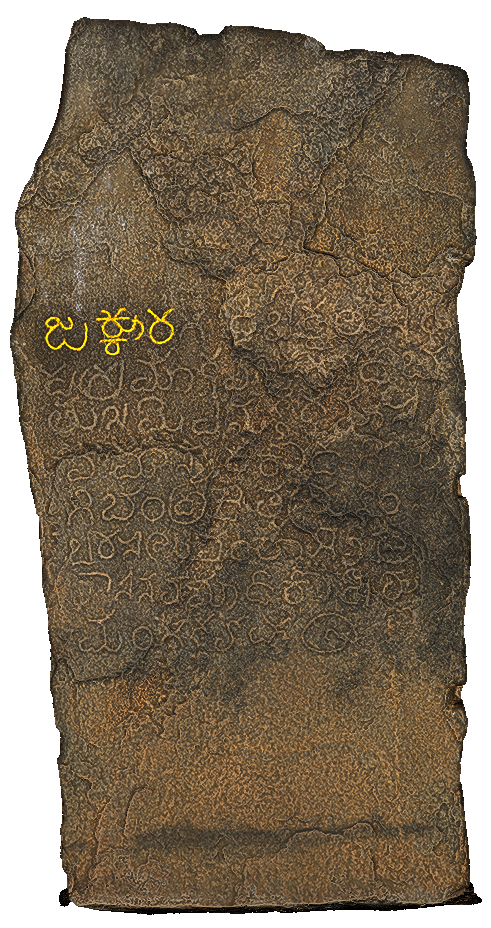
The name 'Jakkūra' shown highlighted in gold on the Jakkur 1342 CE Honnamarayanayaka Donation inscription stone

Jakkur, a suburb in Bengaluru, is a locality with a long history, spanning approximately 700 years. The name "Jakkur" is found in an inscription dated to 1342 CE, providing clear evidence of the locality's antiquity. This area is home to four inscriptions and several hero stones (Veeragallu). The earliest inscriptions found in the area can be dated paleographically to the 9th - 10th century CE. These inscriptions also suggest that Jakkur Lake, considered one of the largest lakes in Bangalore, existed at least seven centuries ago. Two hero stones have also been discovered in Jakkur: one is a Atmabalidana (self-sacrifice) memorial stone from the 10th century, and the other is a Maha-Sati stone from the 16th-17th centuries. Recent efforts have focused on the conservation of these historical markers.

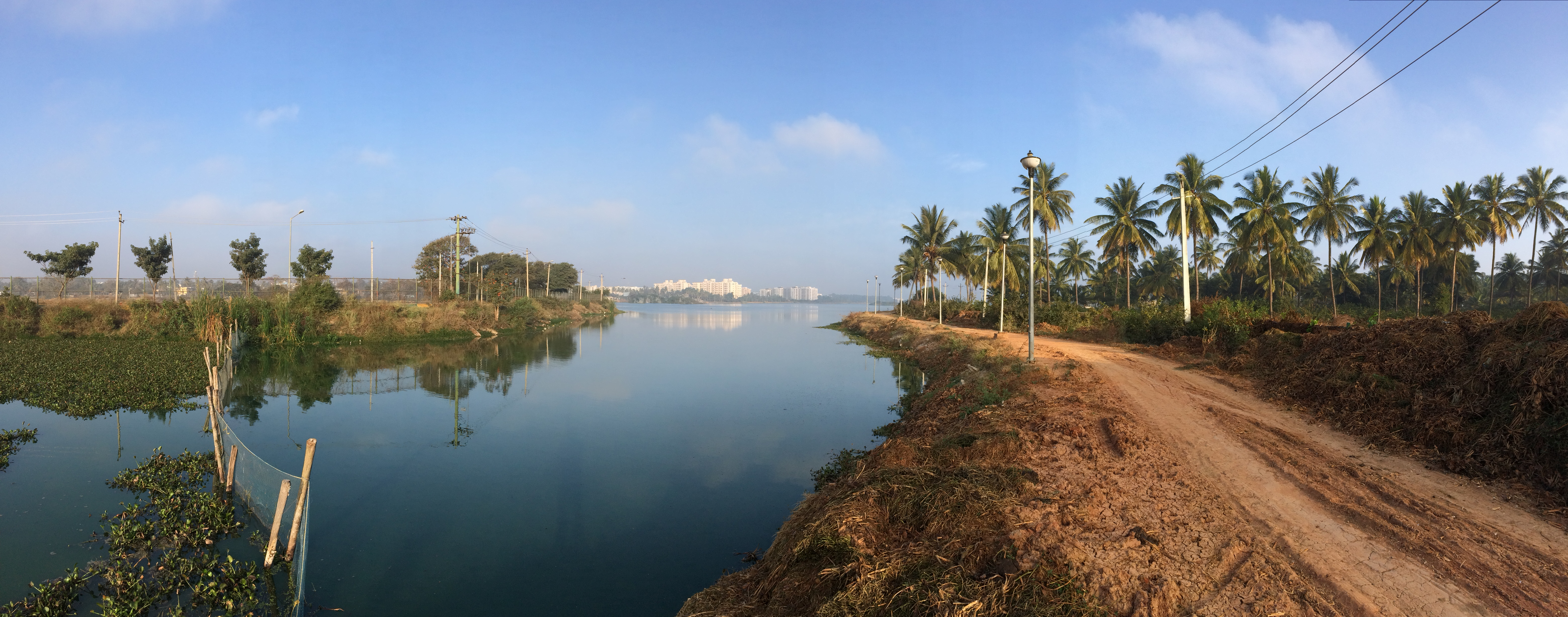
Jakkur Lake, Bangalore. Several inscriptions discussed in the article were found nearby.

== Jakkur 1432 CE God Allalanatha inscription ==
Allalanatha inscription
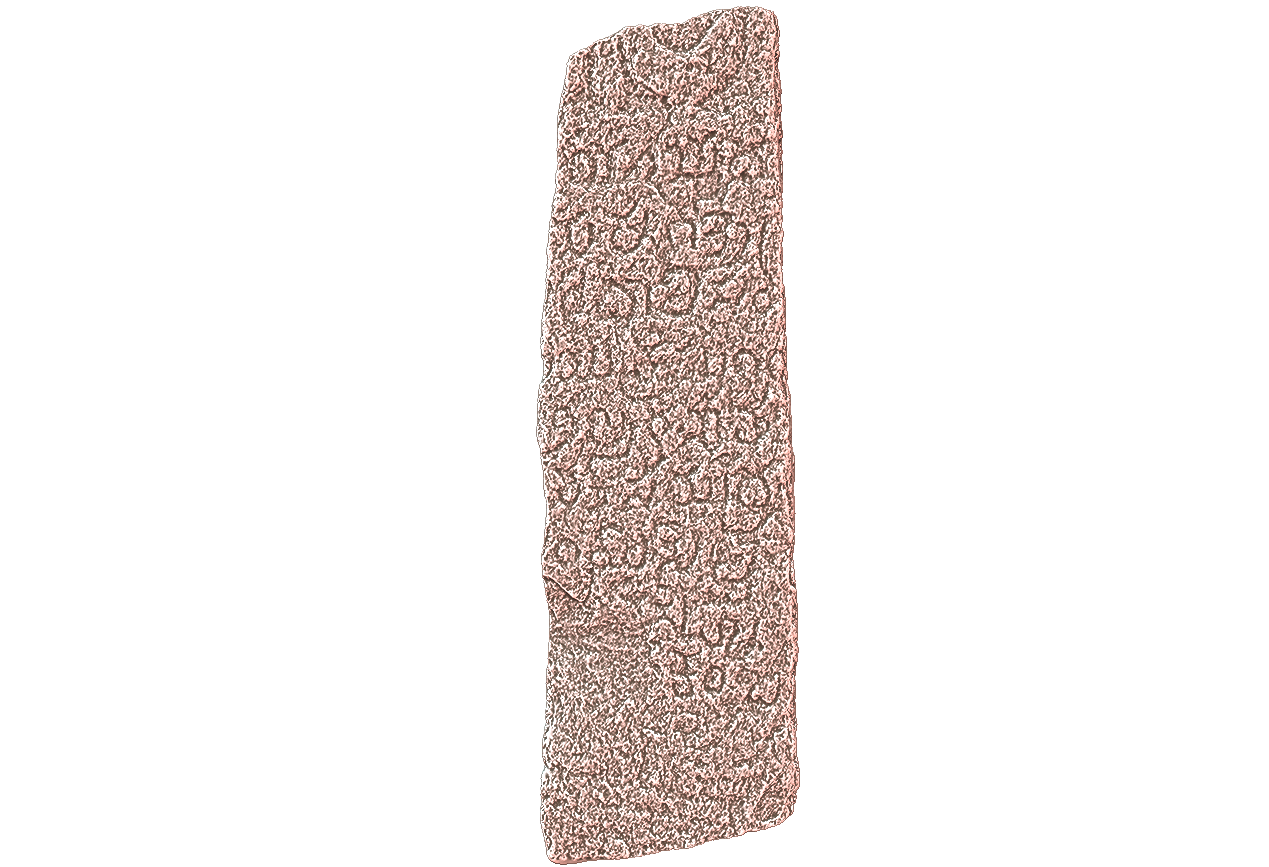
- Artificially colored image of the 1432 CE Allalanatha inscription.
- Material: Stone
- Height: 62 cm (24 in)
- Created: 1432 (594 years ago)
- Discovered: 2021; Jakkur, Bengaluru
- Present location: 30.07925000°N 77.60761111°E
- Language: Kannada
- https://mythicsociety.github.io/AksharaBhandara/#/learn/Shasanagalu?id=115075

This Kannada inscription documents the donation of a Garuda pillar to an Allalanatha temple in 1432 CE. Due to the worn condition of the letters, the full inscription cannot be completely deciphered.

=== Discovery and dating ===
The inscription was discovered near a roadside in December 2021 by K R Narasimhan and Dhanpal Manchenahalli and was later relocated nearby. Based on the date mentioned in the inscription, "jayābhyudaya varuṣa 1354 paridāvi saṃ cayitra su 10", it can be precisely dated to 10 April 1432 CE (Julian calendar).

=== Transliteration of the inscription ===
The inscription consists of nine lines. Digital images of each character, the inscription itself, a summary, and other information are available through theAkshara Bhandara software. The transliterated text in Kannada and IAST is

| Line Number | Kannada | IAST |
|---|---|---|
| 1 | [ಜ]ಯಾಭ್ಯುದ | [ja]yābhyuda |
| 2 | [ಯ ವ] ರುಷ ೧೩೫ | [ya va] ruṣa 135 |
| 3 | (೪) [ಪ] ರಿದಾವಿ ಸಂ | (4) [pa] ridāvi saṃ |
| 4 | [ಚ] ಯಿತ್ರ ಸು ೧೦ | [ca] yitra su 10 |
| 5 | ಅಲ್ಲಾಳನಾತ | allāl̤anāta |
| 6 | . ಕ . ಸಮುದ್ರ | . ka . samudra |
| 7 | ೦ಮಿಸಿತ್ತ | ṃmisitta |
| 8 | . . ಸೇವೆ | . . sevĕ |
| 9 | . . . ಕಂಬ | . . . kaṃba |

== Jakkur 1000 CE Kalnadu inscription ==
Jakkur Kalnad inscription
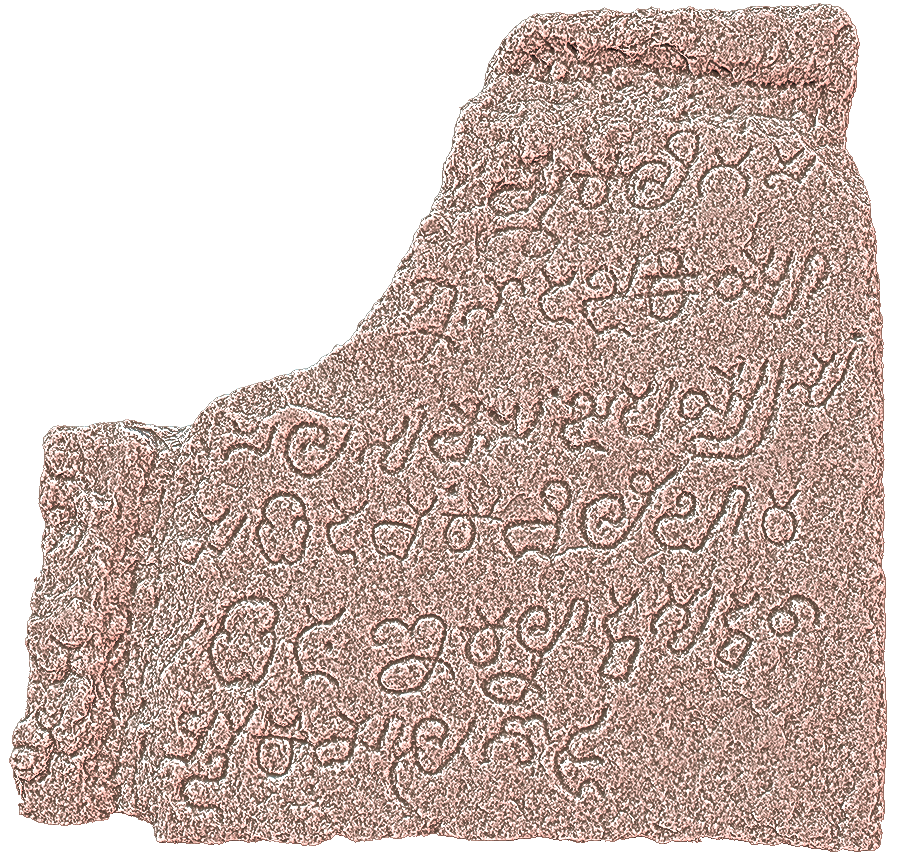
- Artificially colored image of the 10th-century Kalnadu inscription.
- Material: Stone
- Height: 75 cm (30 inches)
- Width: 75 cm (30 inches)
- Writing: Kannada script
- Created: 10th century CE
- Discovered: 2017; Jakkur
- Present location: 13.0799726°N 77.6101814°E
- Language: Kannada
- https://mythicsociety.github.io/AksharaBhandara/#/learn/Shasanagalu?id=1041000

This Kannada inscription, paleographically dated to the 10th century CE, records the donation of a village to Sanjayappa. Villages donated to the families of martyrs who died protecting the village or kingdom were called "kalnad/kalnatu". The inscription contains the word "Jakkiyu," potentially an older name for Jakkur or a reference to "Yakshi". This inscription was discovered in 2017 by researchers K. R. Narasimhan and P. L. Udaya Kumar.

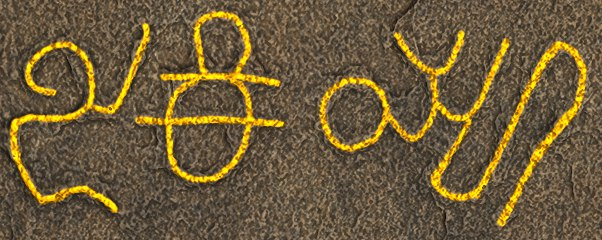
Detail showing the name "Jakkiyu" on the 1000 CE Kalnadu inscription.

=== Transliteration of the inscription ===
The inscription has six lines. Digital images and related information are available through Akshara Bhandara software. The transliterated text in Kannada and IAST is

| Line Number | Kannada | IAST |
|---|---|---|
| 1 | . . . . . ಮ್ಮಕಲಿಗ ಸ | . . . . . mmakaliga sa |
| 2 | . . . . . ಣ್ನನಾಡ ಜಕ್ಕಿಯೂ | . . . . . ṇnanāḍa jakkiyū |
| 3 | . . .. . .. ಸಲಗುವ ಸಂಜಪಯ್ಯನುಂ | . . .. . .. salaguva saṃjapayyanuṃ |
| 4 | . . . . . ಮೞಿದವಂ ಕವಿಲೆ ಬಾರ | . . . . . maḻidavaṃ kavilĕ bāra |
| 5 | . . . . .ೞಿದ೦ ಇ ಕಲ್ನಾಡು ಗುದುರಾ | . . . . .ḻida0 i kalnāḍu gudurā |
| 6 | . . . .. . . . ನೆನ್ದಕಮಾಲೆಗೊಟ್ಟ | . . . .. . . . nĕndakamālĕgŏṭṭa |

=== Translation ===
The inscription states that Kalnadu was given to Sanjapayya of Sunnadu (small country) Jakkur. It also records a curse upon anyone who destroys the grant, stating that such a person would incur the sin equivalent to killing Kavile (interpreted as a sacred cow) in Varanasi.

== Jakkur 10th Century CE Prashasti inscription ==
Jakkur Prashasthi inscription
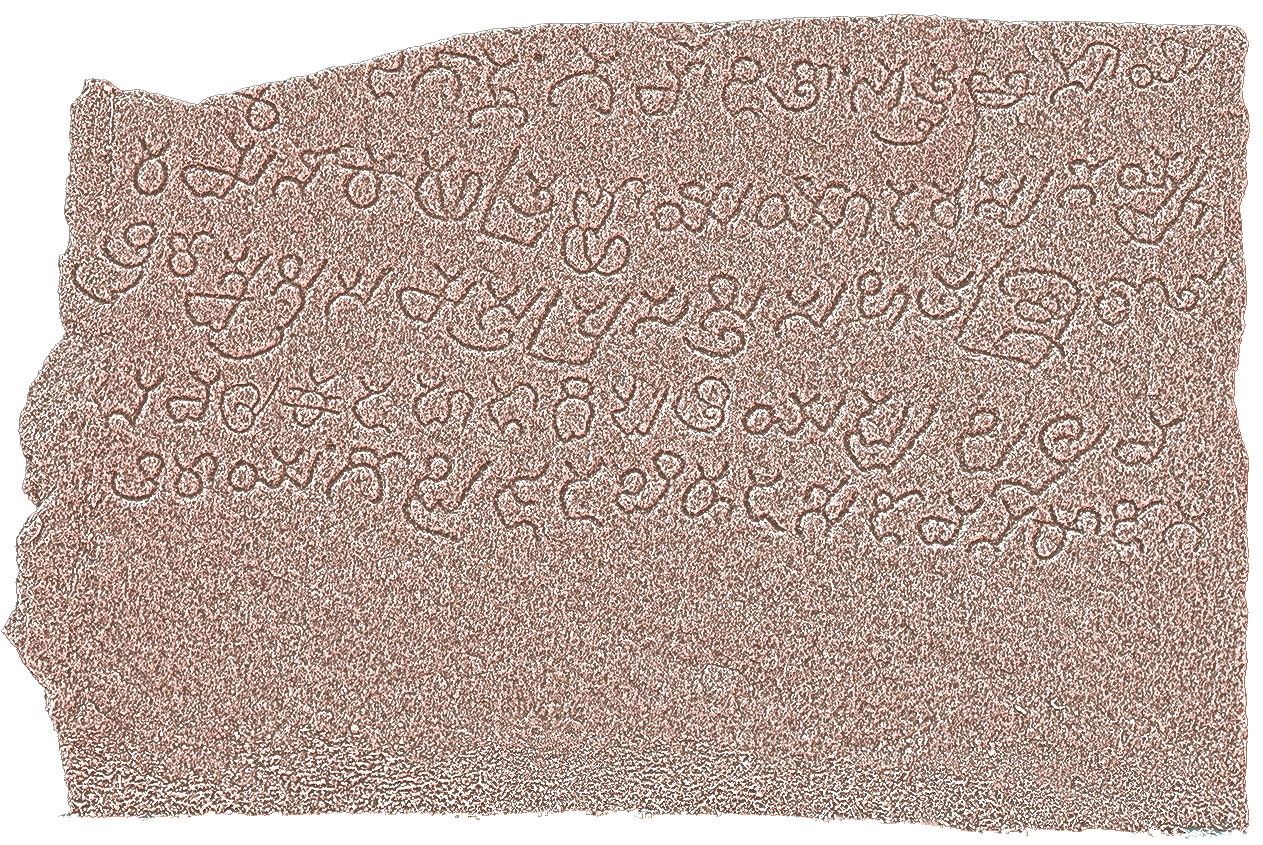
- Digitally colored image of the 10th-century Prashasti inscription.
- Material: Stone
- Height: 72 cm (28 inches)
- Width: 108 cm (43 inches)
- Writing: Kannada script
- Created: 10th century CE
- Discovered: Jakkur
- Present location: 13.0789983°N 77.607214°E
- Language: Kannada
- https://mythicsociety.github.io/AksharaBhandara/#/learn/Shasanagalu?id=115150

This Kannada inscription, paleographically dated to the 10th century CE, is a significant epigraphic record found in Jakkur village. It documents a conflict between Ballavathirayanna, the ruler of Navalakka, and Birudasedeva of Gubetta. The inscription also indicates that Jakkuru village belonged to 'Gangavadithombattarusavira', an administrative division dating back to the Western Ganga period.

=== Discovery and dating ===
Discovered partially buried in a field by KR Narasimhan and Dhanapal Manchenahalli, the inscription was moved to KV Bhairegowda Kalamandir with the help of local residents. The inscription is dated paleographically to the 10th century CE.

=== Transliteration of the inscription ===
The inscription has five lines. Digital images and related information are available through Akshara Bhandara software. The transliterated text in Kannada and IAST is provided in a table format is:

| | Kannada | IAST |
|---|---|---|
| 1 | ಮ ದ ಗಾಳಂಗವಾಡಿ ತೊಂಭತ್ತುಸಾಯಿ | . . ma . da gāl̤gaṃgavāḍi tŏṃbhattaṟusāyi |
| 2 | ರಮನೇಕ ಛತ್ರಚ್ಛಾಯೆಯೊಳರಸುಗೆಯ್ಯು | ramaneka chatracchāyĕyŏl̤arasugĕyyu |
| 3 | ತಿರೆ ಸ್ವಸ್ತಿ ಸಮಸ್ತ ಪ್ರಸಸ್ತಿ ಸಹಿತ ಶ್ರೀ ಮತ್ | ttirĕ svasti samasta prasasti sahita śrīmat |
| 4 | ನವಲಕ್ಕದಹಳಾಧಿಪತಿಯಪ್ಪ ಬಲ್ಲವ | navalakkadahal̤ādhipatiyappa ballava |
| 5 | ತಿರಾಯಂ ಗೊಬೆಟ್ಟದ ಬಿರುದಸೆದೇವನ ಕಾಳೆಗ | tirāyaṃ gŏbĕṭṭada birudasĕdevana kāl̤ĕga |

== Jakkur 1342 CE Honnamarayanayaka Donation Inscription ==
Honnamarayanayaka Donation Inscription
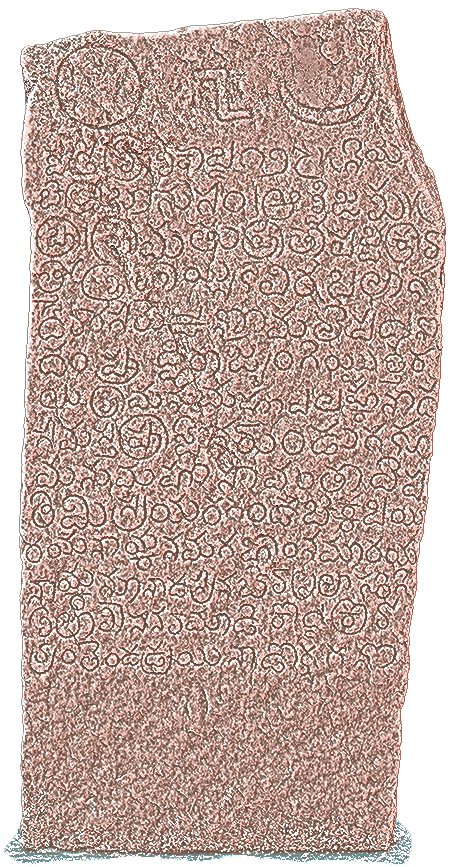
- Digitally colored image of the front side of the 1342 CE Honnamarayanayaka Donation Inscription.

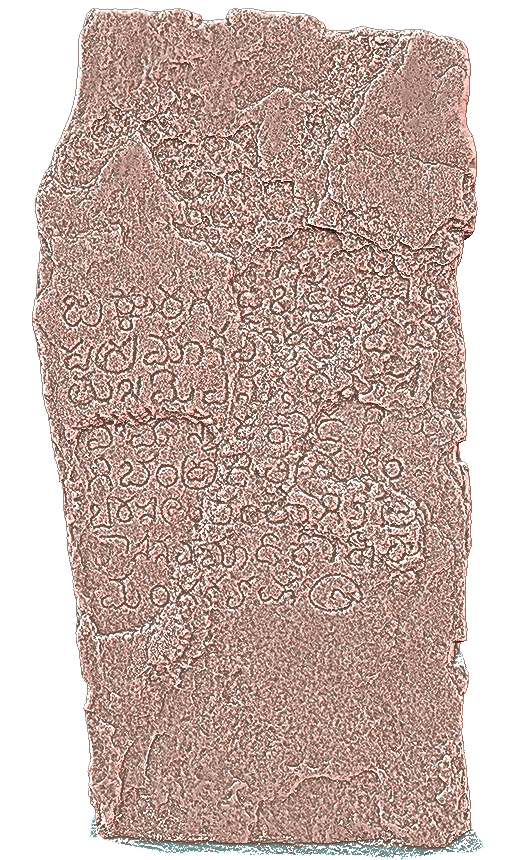
- Digitally colored image of the back side of the 1342 CE Honnamarayanayaka Donation Inscription.
- Language: Kannada
- Height: 143 cm (56 in)
- Width: 72 cm (28 in)
- Discovered place: Jakkur, Bengaluru, Karnataka
- Discovered: 1905
- Present location: 13.07891667°N 77.60725000°E
- Symbols: Sun, Moon
- https://mythicsociety.github.io/AksharaBhandara/#/learn/Shasanagalu?id=1011342

This Kannada inscription is crucial for understanding the history of Jakkur. It records the donation of tax-exempt irrigated, rain-fed, pastoral, and waste lands of Jakkur, belonging to the dominion of Honnamaranayaka, a local feudal lord, to the "nāḍa senabhova" (Kannada: ನಾಡ ಸೇನಭೋವ) Allala. "nāḍa senabhova" were tax officers responsible for collecting village taxes. During this time, the area was ruled by the Hoysala king Veeraballala III from his capital, 'Unnamalepattana', the historical name of Tiruvannamalai in Tamil Nadu. The inscription features symbols of the sun and moon, signifying the eternity of the donation, a common motif in historical Indian art. It also mentions unique administrative ranks of the time, such as "mahāpasāyita" (Kannada: ಮಹಾಪಸಾಯಿತ), an officer close to the king managing palace affairs, and "yakkaṭiga" (Kannada: ಯಕ್ಕಟಿಗ), special bodyguards to the king.

=== Discovery and dating ===
The inscription was first documented by B.L. Rice in Volume 9 of Epigraphia Carnatica and was rediscovered by historians in 2017. Based on the corresponding date in the Hindu calendar, the inscription can be precisely dated to 5 October 1342 CE (Julian calendar).

=== Transliteration of the inscription ===
Digital Images of each of the characters of this inscription, images of the inscription itself, summary and the other information about the inscription have been shared via Akshara Bhandara software

The inscription's text is available through Akshara Bhandara software. The text is provided in a table format below, showing the Kannada and IAST transliteration for both the front and back sides of the inscription stone.

| Line Number | Kannada | IAST |
| | (ಮುಂಭಾಗ) | (Front Side) |
|---|---|---|
| 1 | ಸ್ವಸ್ತಿ ಶ್ರೀ ಶಕಾಬ್ದ ೧೨೬೫ ನೆಯ | svasti śrī śakābda 1265 nĕya |
| 2 | ಚಿತ್ರಭಾನು ಸಂ| ಆಶ್ವೀಜ ಶು೫ | citrabhānu saṃ| āśvīja śu5 |
| 3 | ಬ್ರ | ಶ್ರೀಮತು ಪ್ರತಾಪ ಚ್ಚಕ್ರವ | bra | śrīmatu pratāpa ccakrava |
| 4 | ರ್ತ್ತಿ ಶ್ರೀ ಹೊಯ್ಸಳ ವೀರಬಲ್ಲಾಳ | rtti śrī hŏysal̤a vīraballāl̤a |
| 5 | ದೇವರಸರು ಉಣ್ಣಾಮಲೆ ಪಟ್ಟಣ | devarasaru uṇṇāmalĕ paṭṭaṇa |
| 6 | ದಂ ಪೃಥ್ವಿರಾಜ್ಯಂಗೆ ಯ್ವುತ್ತಿರ | daṃ pṛthvirājyaṃgĕ yvuttira |
| 7 | ಲು ಶ್ರೀ ಮನುಮಹಾ ಎಲಹ್ಕನಾಡ | lu śrī manumahā ĕlahkanāḍa |
| 8 | ಸಮಸ್ತ ಪ್ರಜೆಗವುಂಡುಗಳೂ | samasta prajĕgavuṃḍugal̤ū |
| 9 | ಮನುಮಹಾ ಸಾವಂತಾಧಿಪ | manumahā sāvaṃtādhipa |
| 10 | ತಿ ಮೀಸೆಯರ ಗಂಡ ಚಿಕ್ಕಬಯಿ | ti mīsĕyara gaṃḍa cikkabayi |
| 11 | ರಯನಾಯ್ಕನ ಮಗ ಹೊಂನಮಾರಯ | rayanāykana maga hŏṃnamāraya |
| 12 | ನಾಯ್ಕನೂ ನಾಡಸೇನಬೊವ ಅಲ್ಲಾಳರಿಗೆ | nāykanū nāḍasenabŏva allāl̤arigĕ |
| 13 | ಶಿಲಾಶಾಸನವ ಮಾಡಿಕೊಟ್ಟ ಕ್ರಮ | śilāśāsanava māḍikŏṭṭa krama |
| 14 | ವೆಂತೆಂದಡೆ ಯಿ ನಾಡೊಳಗಣ | vĕṃtĕṃdaḍĕ yi nāḍŏl̤agaṇa |
| | (ಹಿಂಭಾಗ) | (Back Side) |
| 15 | ಜಕ್ಕೂರ ಗದ್ದೆ ಬೆದ್ದಲು . . | jakkūra gaddĕ bĕddalu . . |
| 16 | ಪಗೆಮಾಳ ವೊಳಗಾದ ಚ | pagĕmāl̤a vŏl̤agāda ca |
| 17 | ತು ಸೀಮೆ ಏನುಳ್ಳದನೂ ಸ | tu sīmĕ enul̤l̤adanū sa |
| 18 | ರ್ವಮಾನ್ಯದ ಕೊಡಗಿಯಾ | rvamānyada kŏḍagiyā |
| 19 | ಗಿ ಚಂದ್ರಾದಿತ್ಯರುಳ್ಳಂನ | gi caṃdrādityarul̤l̤aṃna |
| 20 | ಬರ ಸಲುವಂತಾಗಿ ಶಿಲಾ | bara saluvaṃtāgi śilā |
| 21 | ಶಾಸನವ ಮಾಡಿಕೊಟ್ಟರು | śāsanava māḍikŏṭṭaru |
| 22 | ಮಂಗಳ ಮಹಶ್ರೀ | maṃgal̤a mahaśrī |

== Herostones (Veeragallu) and Memorial Sculptures ==
The areas of Jakkur and neighboring localities, including Allalasandra, Agrahara, and Dasarahalli, contain significant historical markers such as herostones (Veeragallu) and other memorial sculptures. These stone monuments offer insights into the history, traditions, beliefs, and acts of bravery from their respective periods.

=== Purpose and Types ===
Herostones were generally erected to commemorate individuals who displayed valor and sacrificed their lives. Some stones specifically honor individuals who performed voluntary self-sacrifice (Atmabalidana Veeragallu), potentially for societal welfare, to ensure victory, or in the belief of attaining liberation (moksha). In certain instances, a hero's spouse might also undertake self-sacrifice following the hero's death.

=== Notable Finds ===
- A 10th-century couple's memorial sculpture, identified as an Atmabalidana Veeragallu, was discovered in Jakkur, partially buried alongside a 1342 CE inscription. Following guidance from citizen historians K.R. Narasimhan and Dhanapal Manchenahalli, this sculpture is now conserved at the K.V. Bhaire Gowda Kala Mandira complex in Jakkur.
- Remains of a destroyed Shaiva temple in Jakkur include Shaiva Dvarapalaka (doorkeeper) sculptures and broken pillars, found with a fragmented inscription. Plans exist to relocate these for conservation at the K.V. Bhaire Gowda Kala Mandira complex.
- A skirmish herostone has been discovered at Agrahara. Herostones in Dasarahalli have been identified and conserved by local residents.
- A herostone in Yelahanka, near Allalasandra, commemorated a dog named Chamundi that died fighting a pig, erected by its master. This stone reportedly disappeared during lake renovation.
- A Maha-Sati herostone has been discovered in a residence at Telecom Layout, Jakkur.

== Conservation Efforts ==
Many inscriptions, herostones and sculptures in the Jakkur area were initially neglected, with local residents reportedly unaware of their historical significance. Citizen historians K.R. Narasimhan, Dhanapal Manchenahalli and P L Udaya Kumar guided villagers in conservation efforts. The 10th-century Atmabalidana Veeragallu from Jakkur is now conserved at the K.V. Bhaire Gowda Kala Mandira complex. In Allalasandra, a resident named Somasekhar relocated an inscription to safety after attending an awareness program. Expert assistance was provided for conservation work, including rejoining a broken inscription in Agrahara.

== Gallery ==
Inscriptions and Herostones of Jakkur
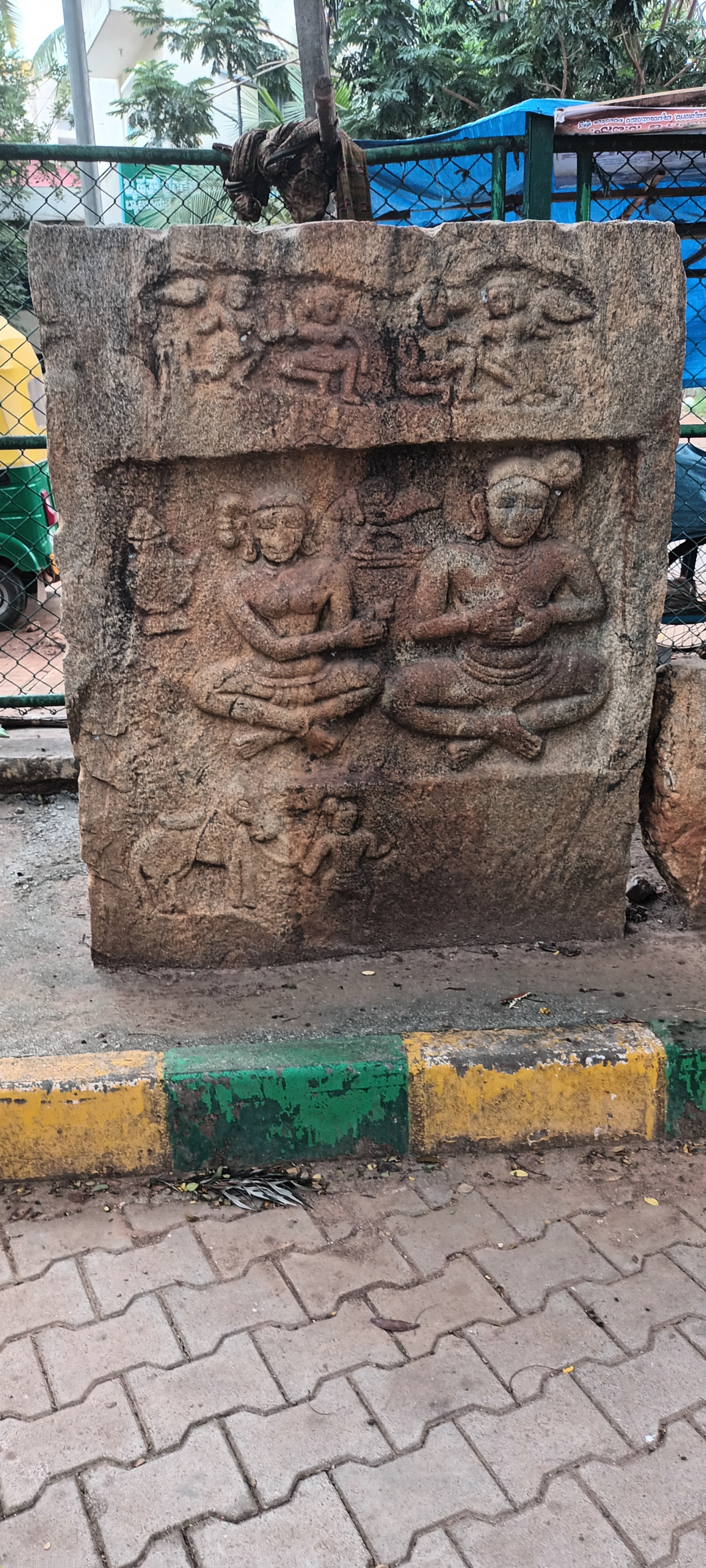
The 10th-century Atmabalidana (self-sacrifice) memorial stone found in Jakkur.

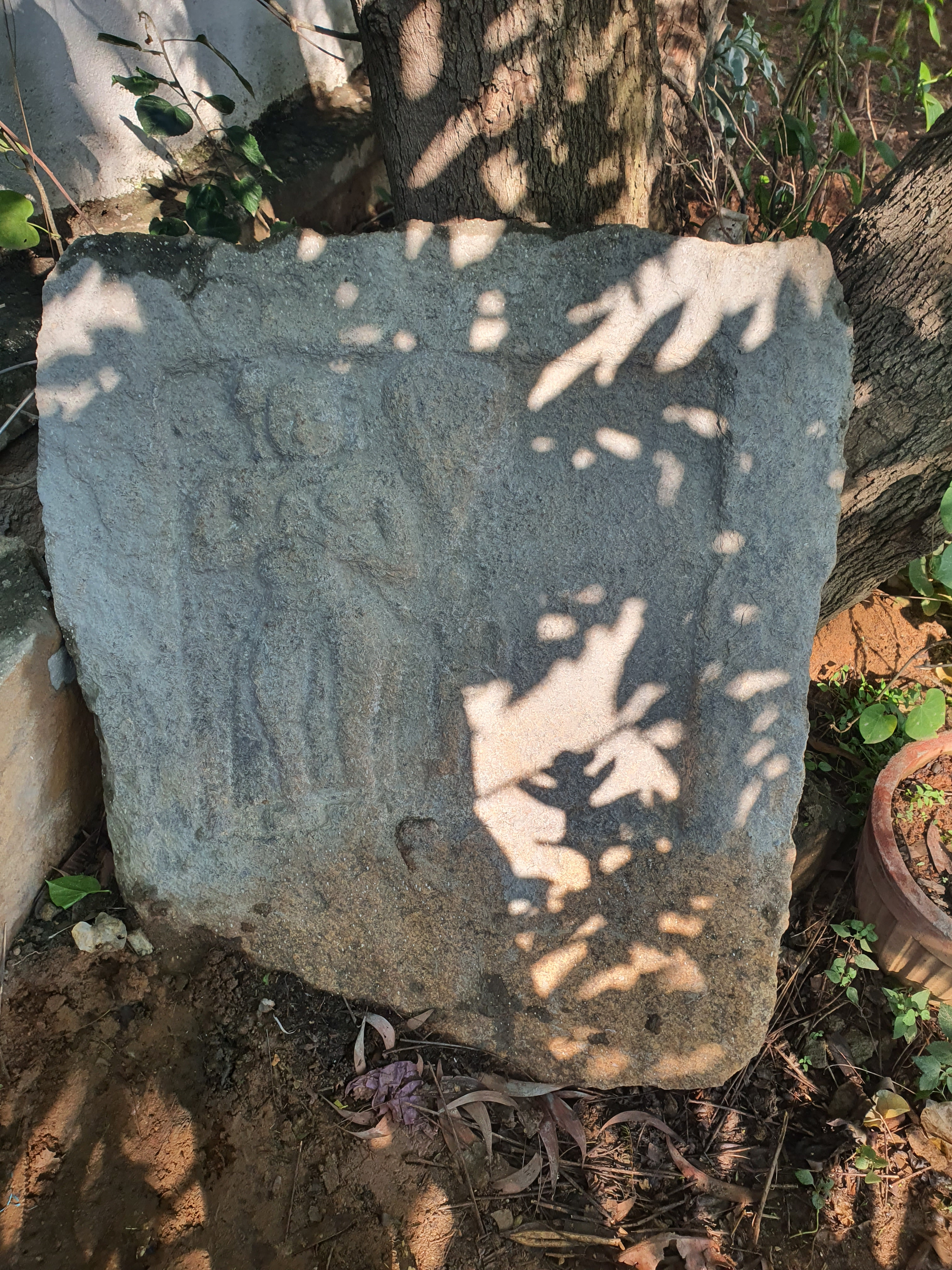
The 16th-century Maha-Sati stone found in Jakkur.

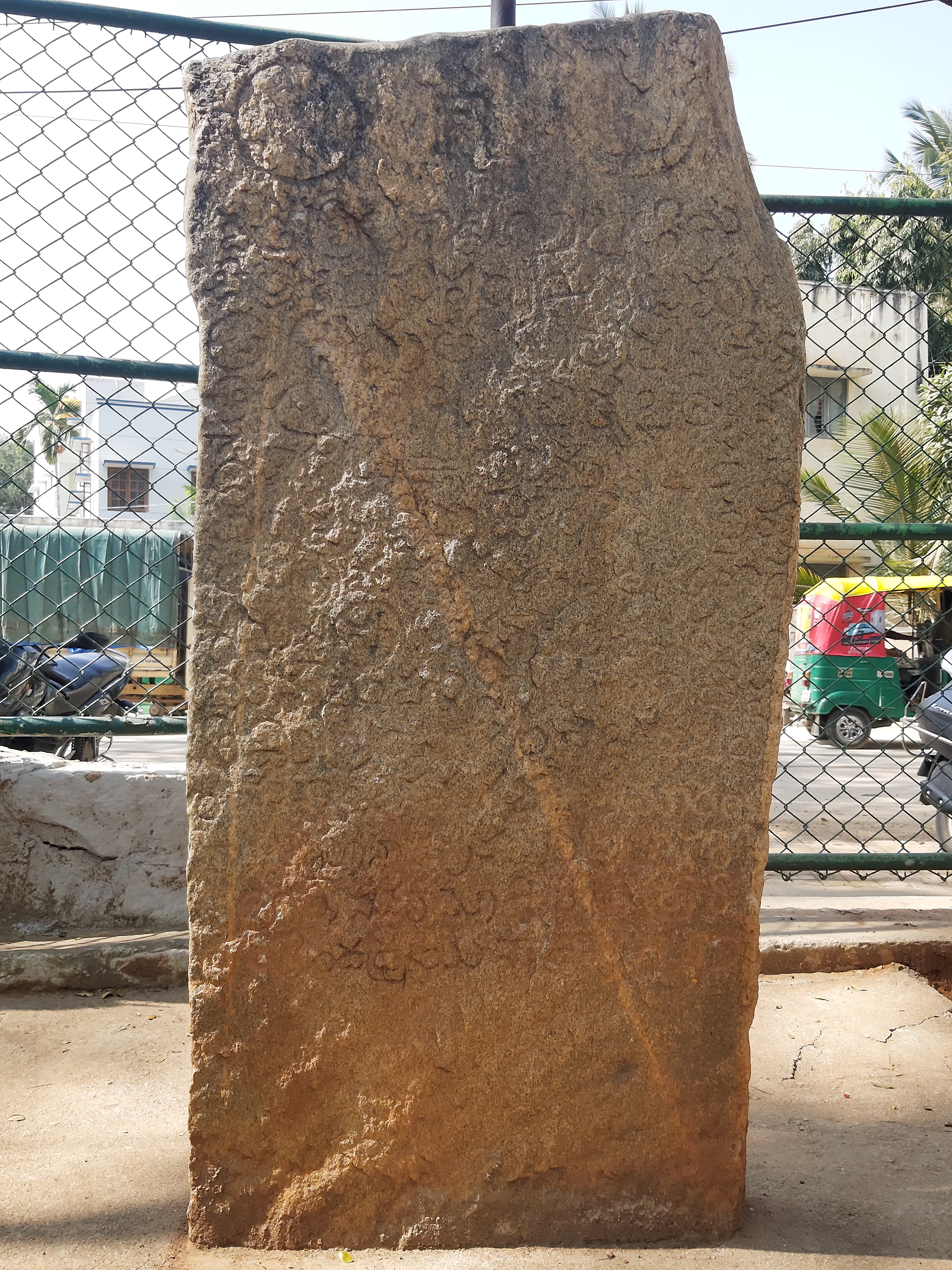
The 1342 CE Honnamarayanayaka inscription from Jakkur.

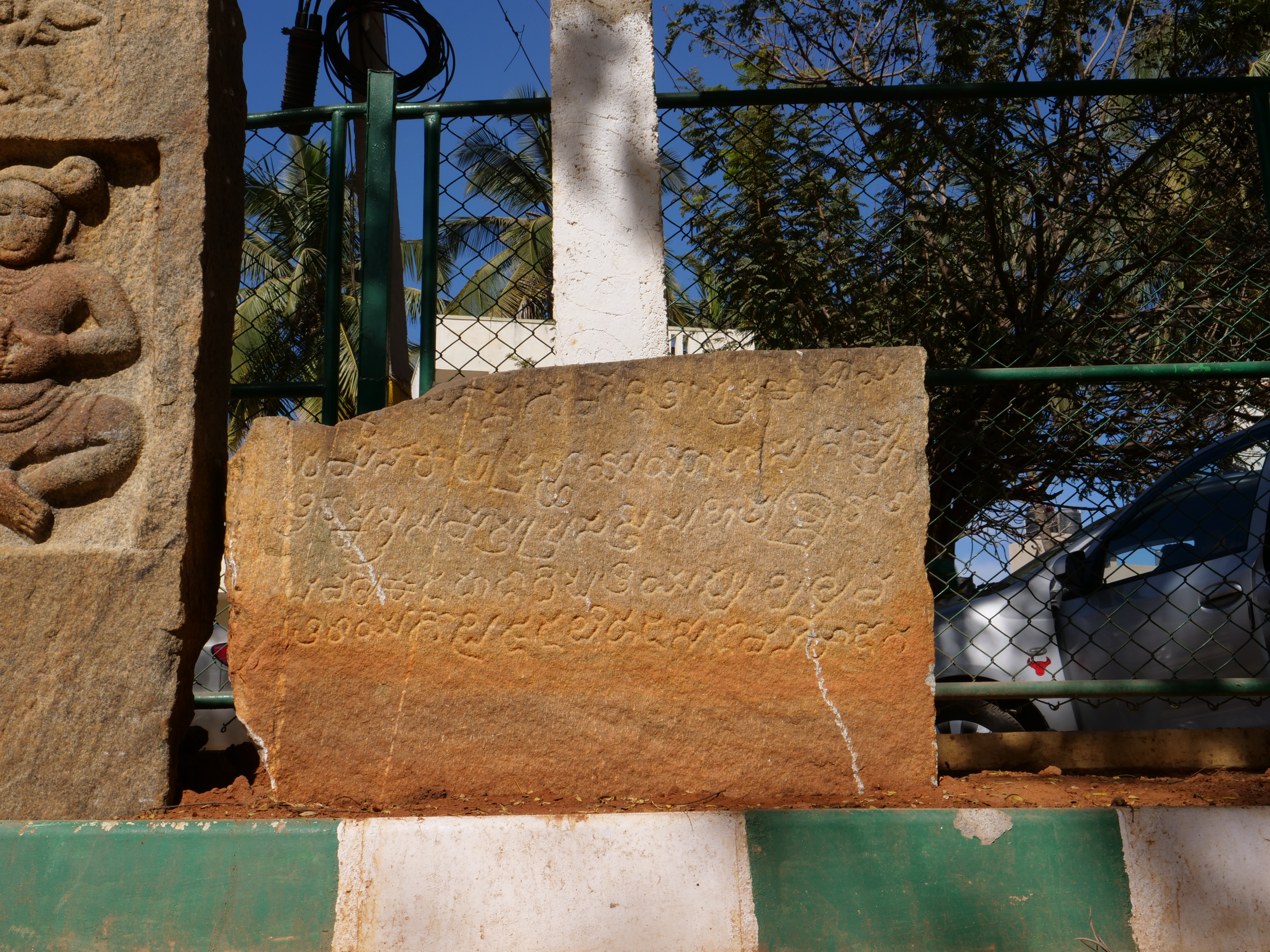
The 10th-century CE Prashasti inscription from Jakkur.

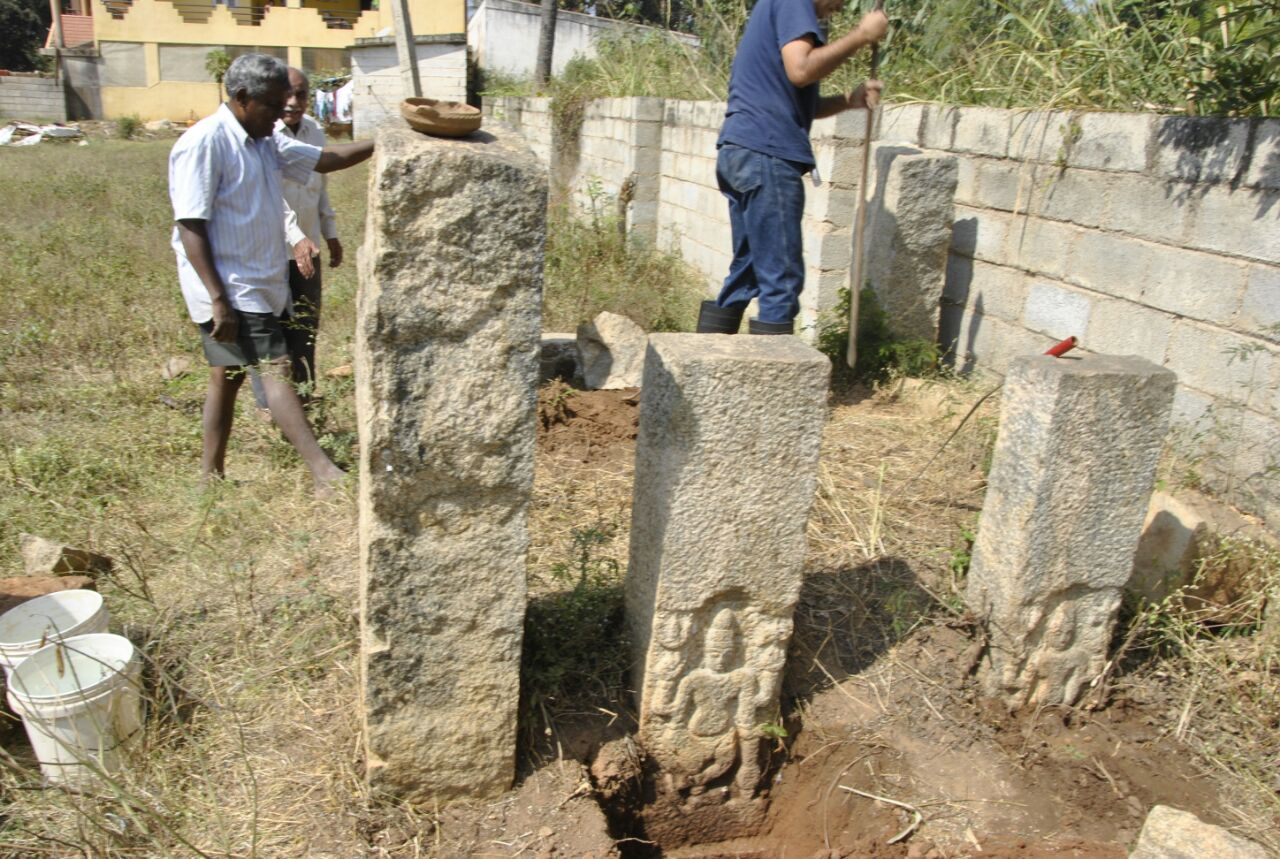
Ruins of the Shaiva temple discovered in Jakkur.

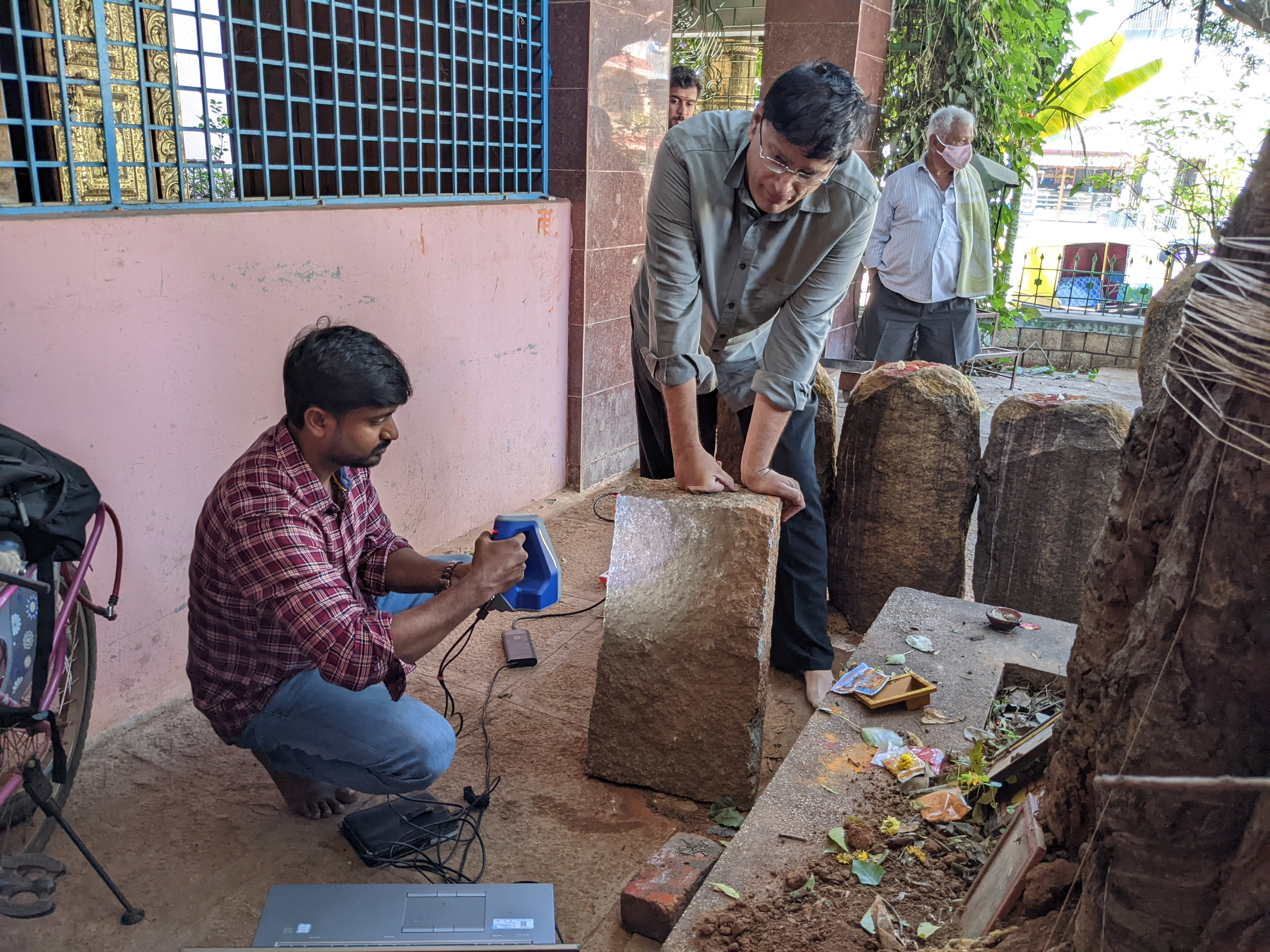
The 1432 CE Allalanatha pillar inscription from Jakkur.

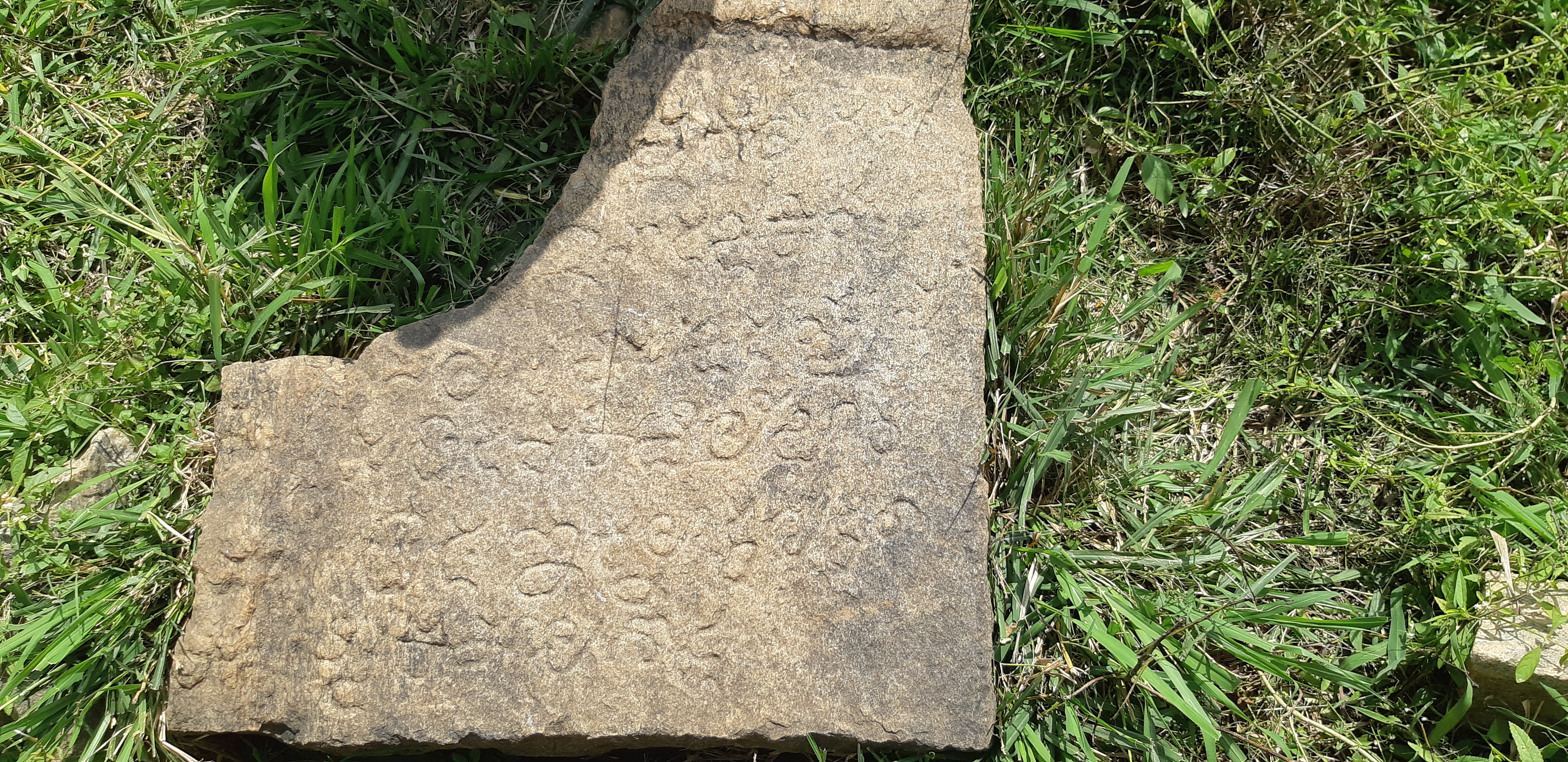
The 10th-century CE Kalnadu inscription from Jakkur.

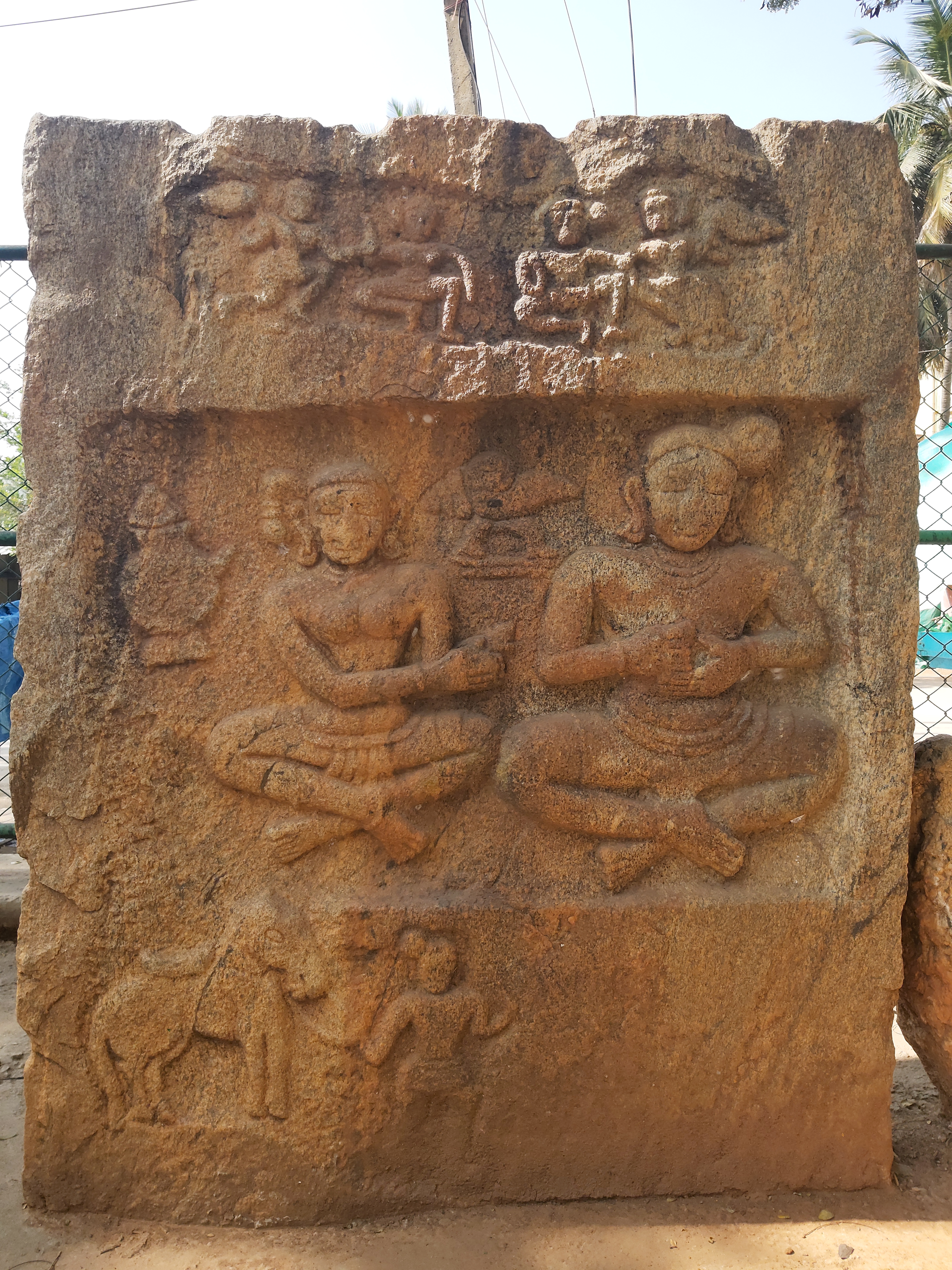
The 10th-century Atmabalidana (self-sacrifice) memorial stone found in Jakkur.

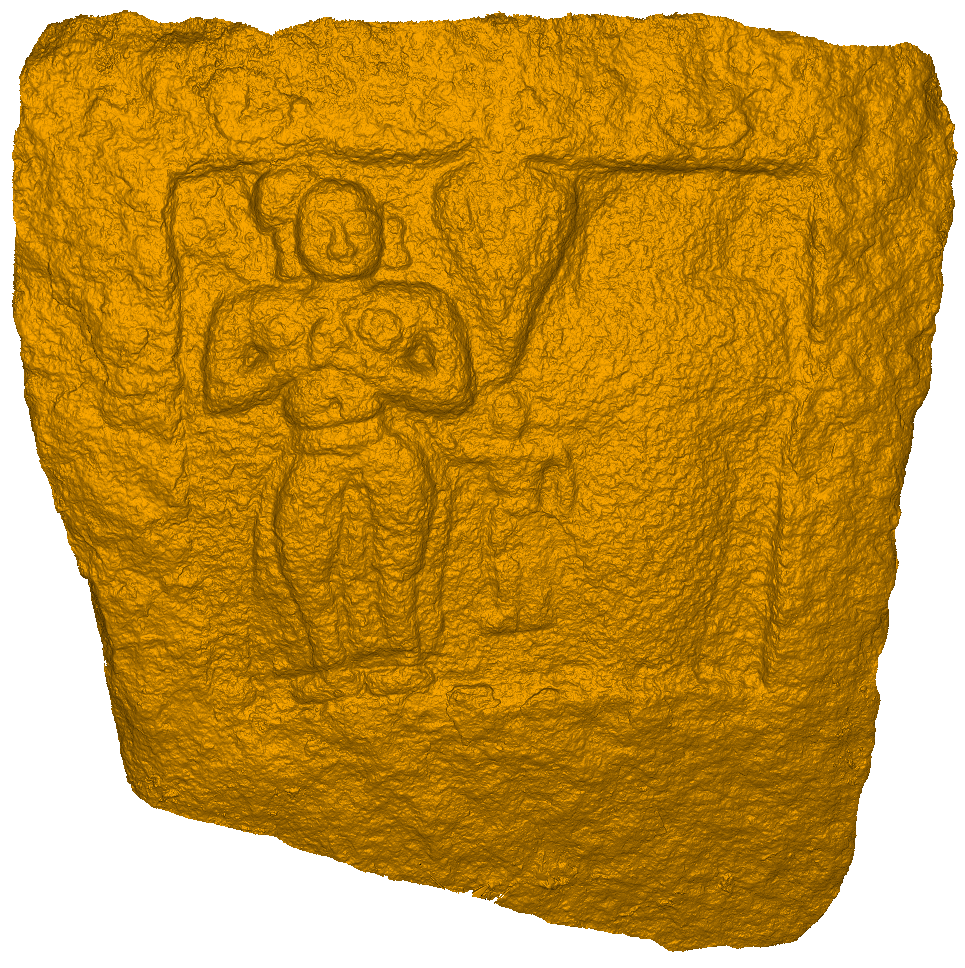
Digitally colored image of the 16th-century Maha-Sati stone from Jakkur.

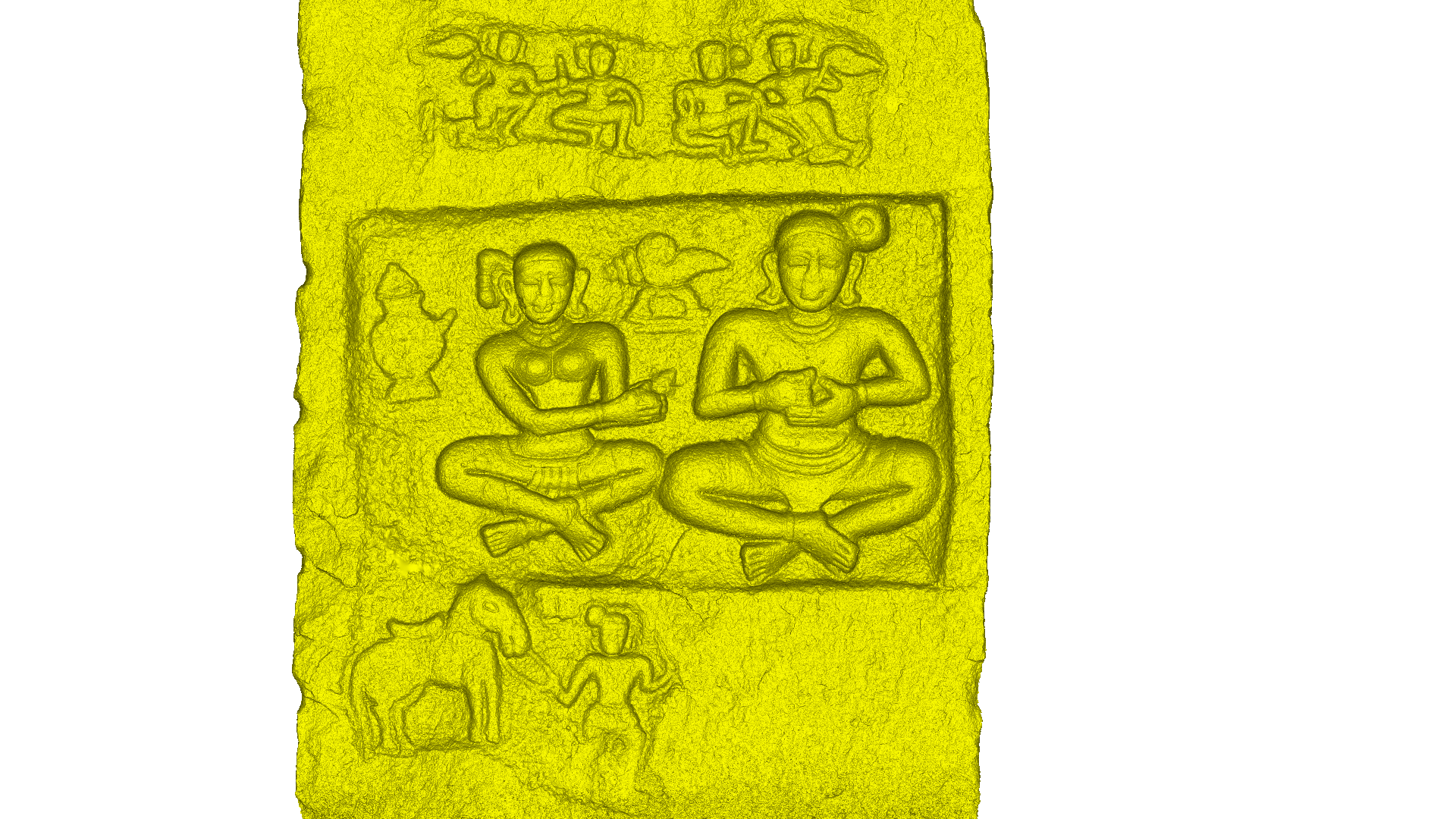
Digitally colored image of the 10th-century Atmabalidana memorial stone from Jakkur.

== See also ==
- Indian inscription
- Kannada inscription
- History of Bangalore
