= Hebballi =

Hebballi may refer to several places in Karnataka, India:

- Hebballi, Bagalkot, a village in Mudhol Taluk, Bagalkot district
- Hebballi, Chikmagalur, a village in Chikmagalur Taluk, Chikmagalur district
- Hebballi, Chitradurga, a village in Hosdurga Taluk, Chitradurga district
- Hebballi, Dharwad, a village in Dharwad Taluk, Dharwad district
- Hebballi, Uttara Kannada, a village in Sirsi Taluk, Uttara Kannada district

== See also ==
- Hebbal (disambiguation)
