= Vidyashilp Academy =

- Bangalore, Karnataka; India

Information
- Type: International school
- Established: 1996
- Language: English
- Affiliations: CISCE, CIE University of Cambridge
- Website: https://vidyashilpacademy.edu.in/

Vidyashilp Academy is a private, co-educational school located in Yelahanka, Bangalore, India. It was established in 1996 in Jakkur, North Bengaluru. In 2022, Vidyashilp Academy was relocated to Govindapura, Yelahanka, North Bengaluru.

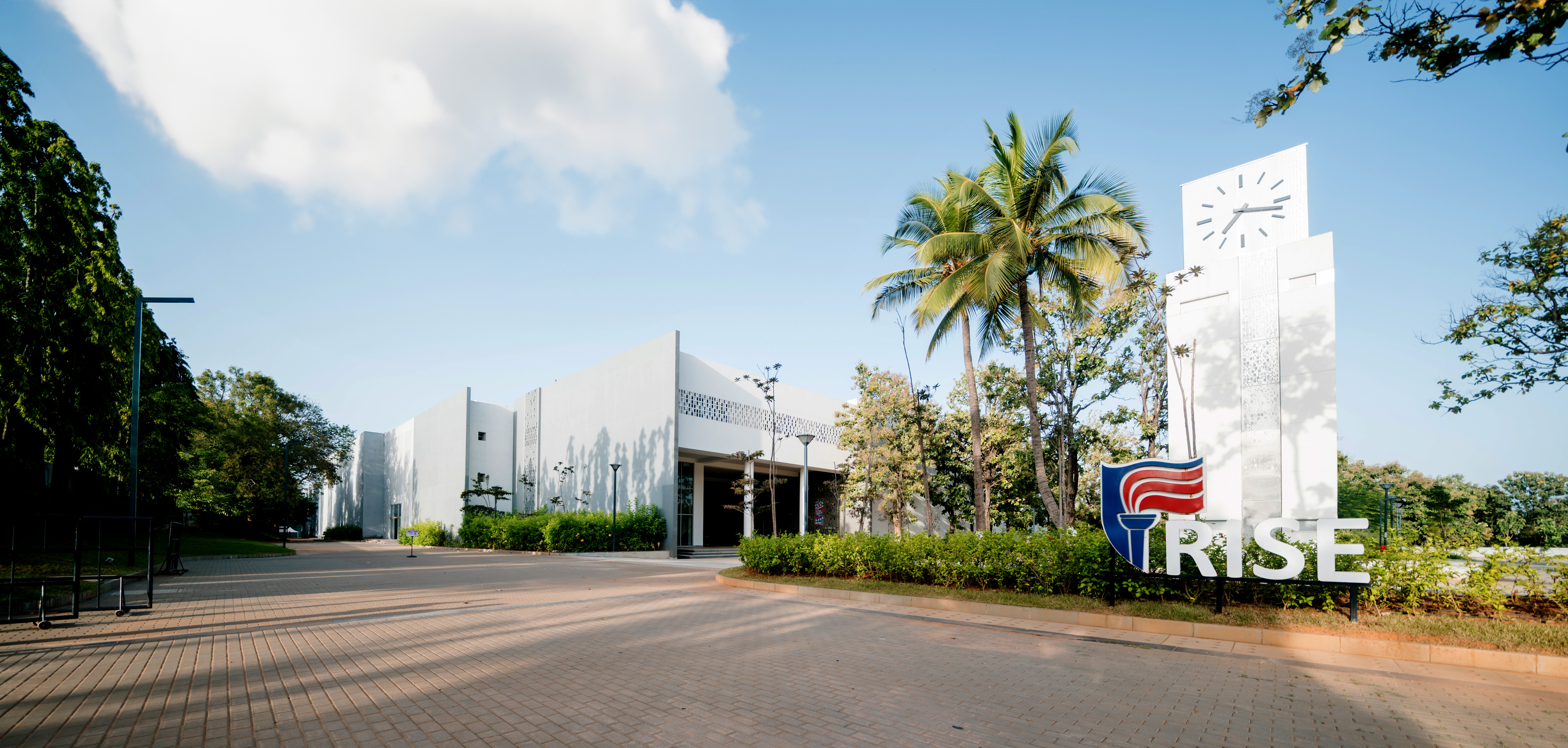
Vidyashilp Academy campus

== Curriculum ==
The school is affiliated with the Council for the Indian School Certificate Examinations (CISCE) and the University of Cambridge International Examinations (CIE). The school draws its curriculum from these organisations. The school also has a learning centre for gifted children in collaboration with the National Institute of Advanced Studies. While having its own in-house curriculum, the school also follows the ICSE board along with A Levels.

== Sustainability initiatives ==
According to a 2018 report in The Better India, Vidyashilp Academy operates a paper recycling unit on its campus that processes about 35–40 kg of paper and scrap collected daily in large bins placed around the school. Students create jewellery boxes, corporate sets, diaries, envelopes, and gift bags from the recycled paper. The school also uses the recycled paper for internal purposes such as newsletters and report cards.

In January 2020, Grade 8 students from Vidyashilp Academy undertook a project to revive the 45-acre Doddasanne Lake in Bengaluru under the “Mission Possible” program of the World Federation of United Nations Associations (WFUNA). The initiative focused on improving groundwater retention, clearing blockages, and engaging the local community.

== Ranking ==
In 2017, Vidyashilp Academy won 2nd place in the UNESCO Happy Schools video contest.
