= Jakkur Aerodrome =

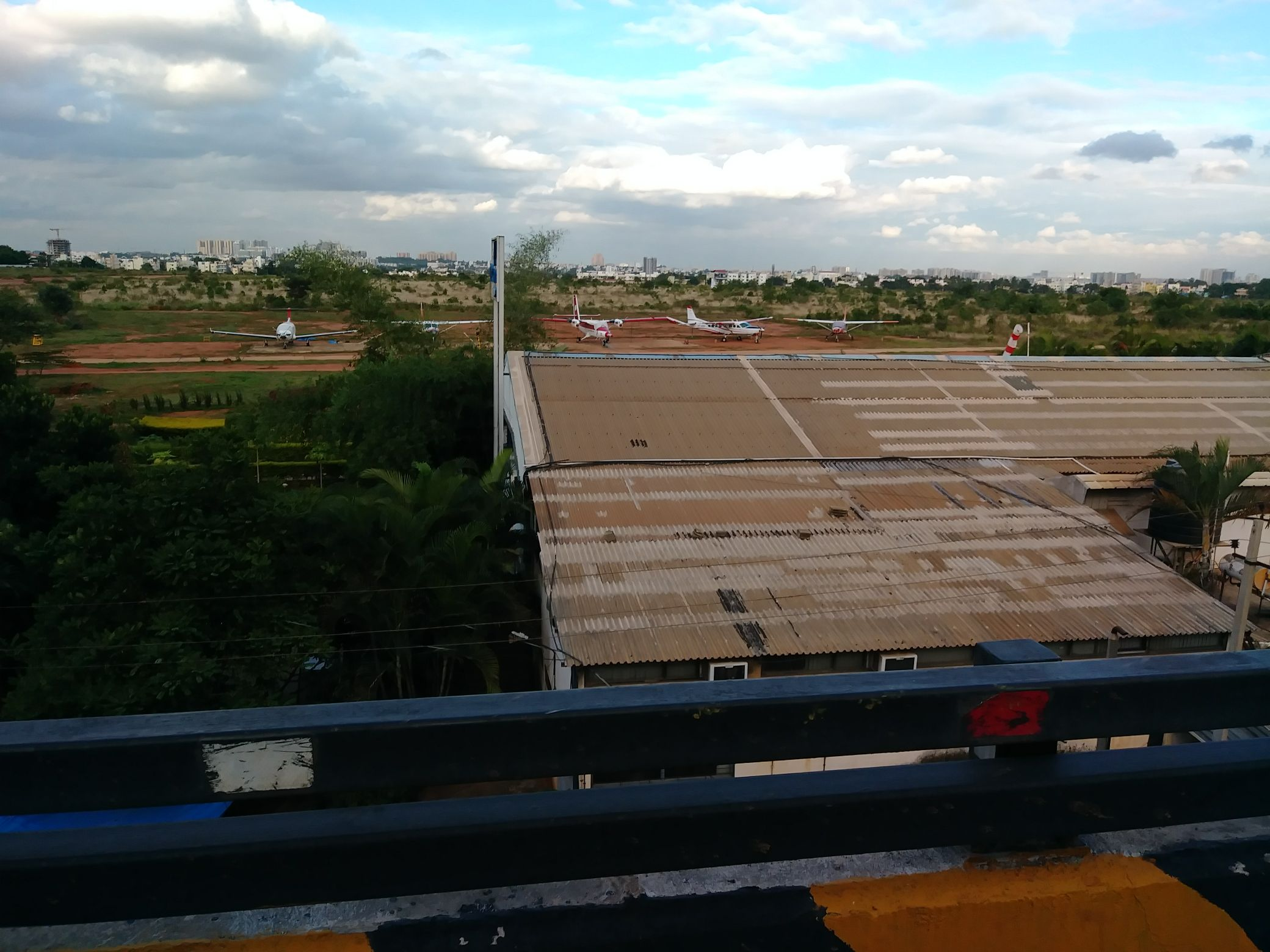
- View from flyover
- IATA: none; ICAO: VOJK

Summary
- Airport type: Public
- Owner: Government of Karnataka
- Location: Jakkur, Bangalore, Karnataka, India
- Elevation AMSL: 3,010 ft (920 m)
- Coordinates: 13°04′37″N 77°35′51″E

Map
- Location within Karnataka Location within India

Runways
Direction	Length		Surface
Direction	ft	m	Surface
08/26	2,953	900	Asphalt
- Source: Great Circle Mapper

Jakkur Aerodrome (ICAO: VOJK) is a Flying School located in Jakkur, a suburb of Bangalore, Karnataka, India. It is the only dedicated general aviation field in Bangalore. The airfield is the site of the Government Flying Training School (GFTS), the only flying school in the state.

The aerodrome is spread over 214 acres (87 ha). The premises include facilities for flight training, area leased to private parties for hangars and maintenance activities and other common facilities (airstrip, fuel station etc.).

== History ==
In 1935, it was reported that the Mysore government was planning to construct a civil aerodrome in Jakkur. A site was selected at the state plantations the following year. An east–west runway had been laid by 1939. The Nizam's State Railway Air Department inaugurated a flight from Hyderabad to Madras via Bangalore in April 1940. The service was mentioned by the diwan of Mysore, Mirza Ismail, in a June speech to the representative assembly. It ended in July when Hyderabad State granted the airline's resources to the Indian government due to World War II. Indian National Airways and Tata Air Lines served Bangalore later during the war. The HAL airport replaced Jakkur as the city's civil airfield after the war.

The Government Flying Training School (GFTS) was inaugurated in December 1948 by Prime Minister Jawaharlal Nehru. It operated smoothly until 1997, when it faced a shortage of aircraft, fuel, maintenance engineers and flying instructors. The school has operated sporadically since then.

In January 2014, a flyover was completed over NH 44 to improve connectivity between the city centre and the far-away Kempegowda International Airport. The flyover, over 12 metres (39 ft) high and constructed immediately west of the runway at Jakkur, presents an obstruction to aircraft landing at the aerodrome. Although the western half of the runway had already been closed off to accommodate, the government closed Jakkur Aerodrome on 8 June. The GFTS was forced to relocate, with 18 students still undergoing training. The school continued students' training at the airports in Hubli and Mysore. However, by October 2014 the school had resumed operations. The western portion of the runway remains closed, but a 170 metres (560 ft) extension is planned.

== Runway ==
Jakkur Aerodrome has a single runway, oriented 08/26 with dimensions 900 by 20 metres (2,953 ft × 66 ft). However, the runway threshold on the 08 side has been displaced to the east because of the obstructing flyover on the western side of the airfield. A taxiway runs parallel to the runway on its north side.

== Government Flying Training School ==
The Government of Karnataka has been operating a flying school at Jakkur Aerodrome since 1949. The Government Flying Training School (GFTS) houses aircraft maintenance facilities, an aircraft and storage hangar, a library and other facilities. It has a fleet of two Cessna 152s and two Cessna 172s. The school also operates air traffic control at the airfield.

== 1 (Kar) Air Squadron NCC ==
1 (Karnataka) Air Squadron NCC is a premier NCC Air Squadron of India and operates from Jakkur Aerodrome. The Unit was raised on 1 June 1954 as 1 (Mysore) Air Sqn NCC and in 1973 was designated 1 (Karnataka) Air Sqn NCC. This Unit imparts flying and institutional training to Air Wing Cadets of the NCC.

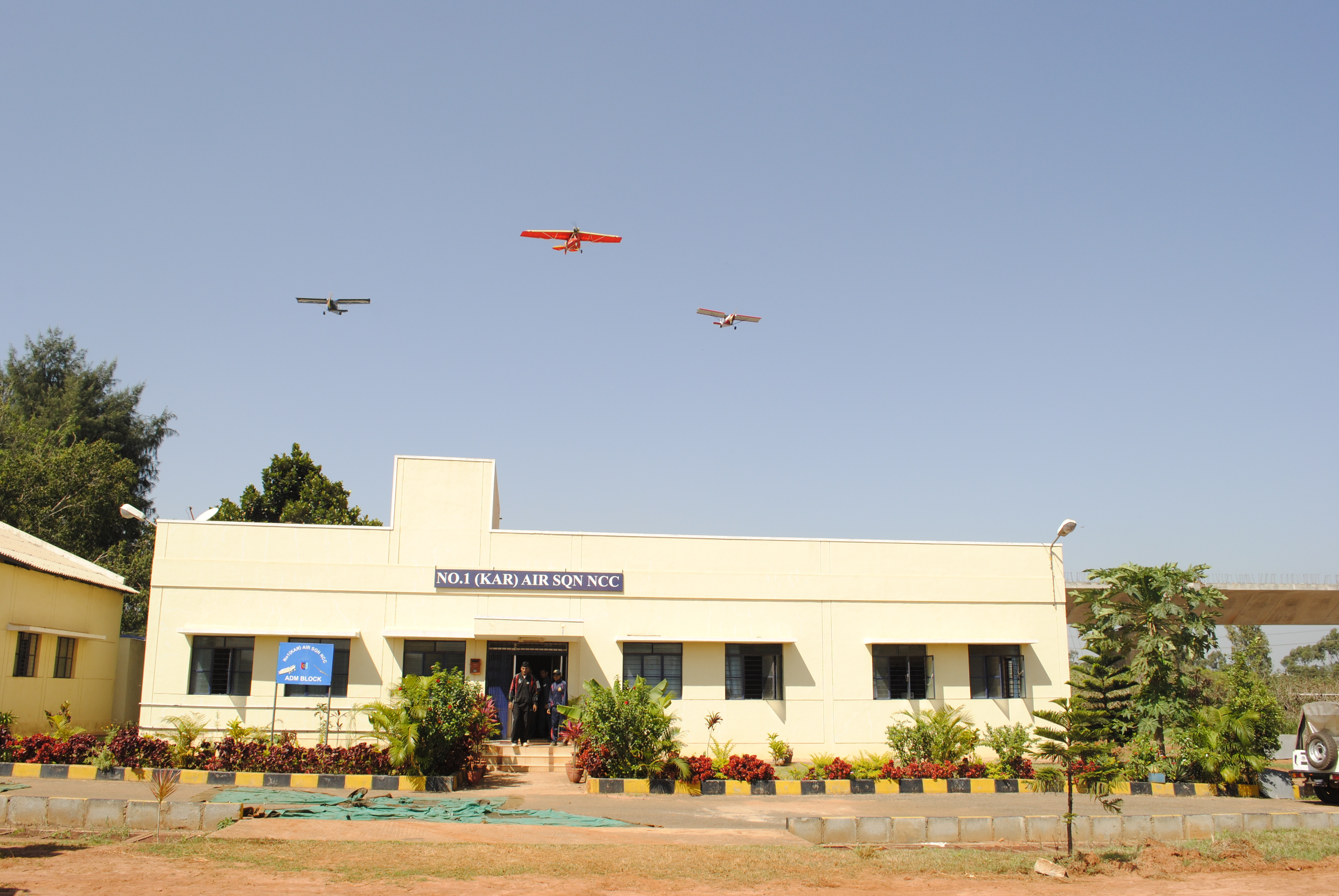
1 (Kar) Air Sqn NCC, Unit Hq located at Jakkur Aerodrome, Bengaluru, India. In picture is the flypast over the Unit HQ during a closing ceremony of All India Vayu Sainik Camp.

== Other operators ==
Jakkur serves as a base for several private aviation companies, including Confident Airlines, Jupiter Aviation Services, Agni Aviation and Bangalore Aerosports, which have popularised microlight flying from the airfield.

== See also ==
- List of airports in Karnataka
