= Jalsoor =

Jalsoor Jalsur
- village
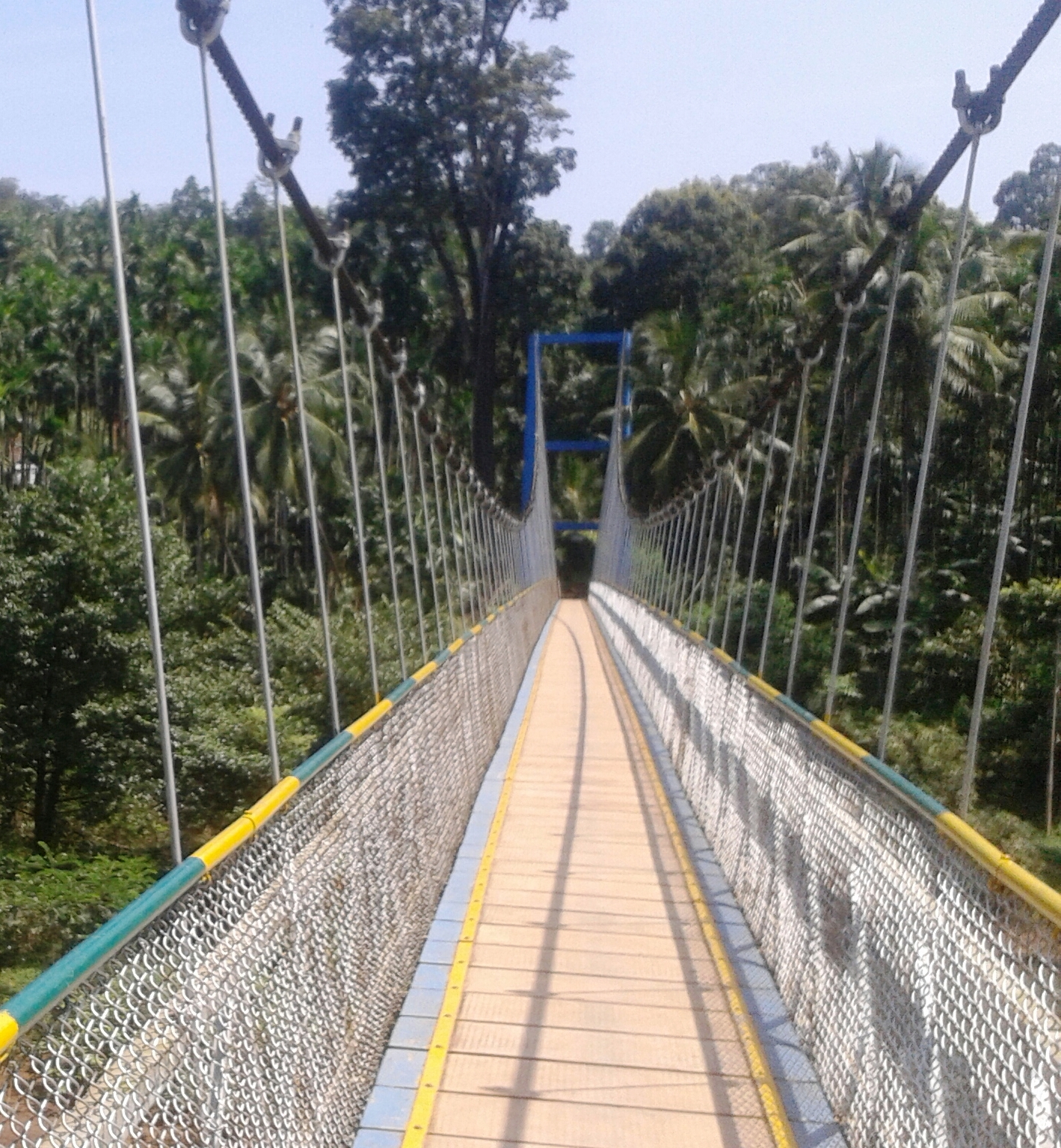
- Hanging Bridge

- Location in Karnataka, India Jalsoor (India)
- Coordinates: 12.5949°N 75.3361°E
- Country: India
- State: Karnataka
- District: Dakshina Kannada
- Talukas: Sullia

Government
  - Body: Grama Panchayath

Area
  - Total: 14.52 km^{2} (5.61 sq mi)
- Elevation: 99 m (325 ft)

Population (2011)
  - Total: 6,623
  - Density: 456.1/km^{2} (1,181/sq mi)

Languages
  - Official: Kannada, Tulu and Arebhashe
- Time zone: UTC+5:30 (IST)
- PIN: 574239
- Telephone code: 08257
- ISO 3166 code: IN-KA
- Vehicle registration: KA 21
- Nearest city: Mangalore
- Sex ratio: 1:1 ♂/♀
- Literacy: 100%%
- Lok Sabha constituency: Mangalore
- Vidhan Sabha constituency: Sullia
- Climate: cool (Köppen)

Jalsoor is a village in Dakshina Kannada district in the south Indian state of Karnataka. This village is major junction connecting three district headquarters; Madikeri, Mangaluru and Kasaragodu. It is one of the main place of trade and transaction in Sullia taluk.

== Demographics ==
As of 2001 India census, Jalsoor had a population of 6368 with 3176 males and 3192 females.

== Image gallery ==
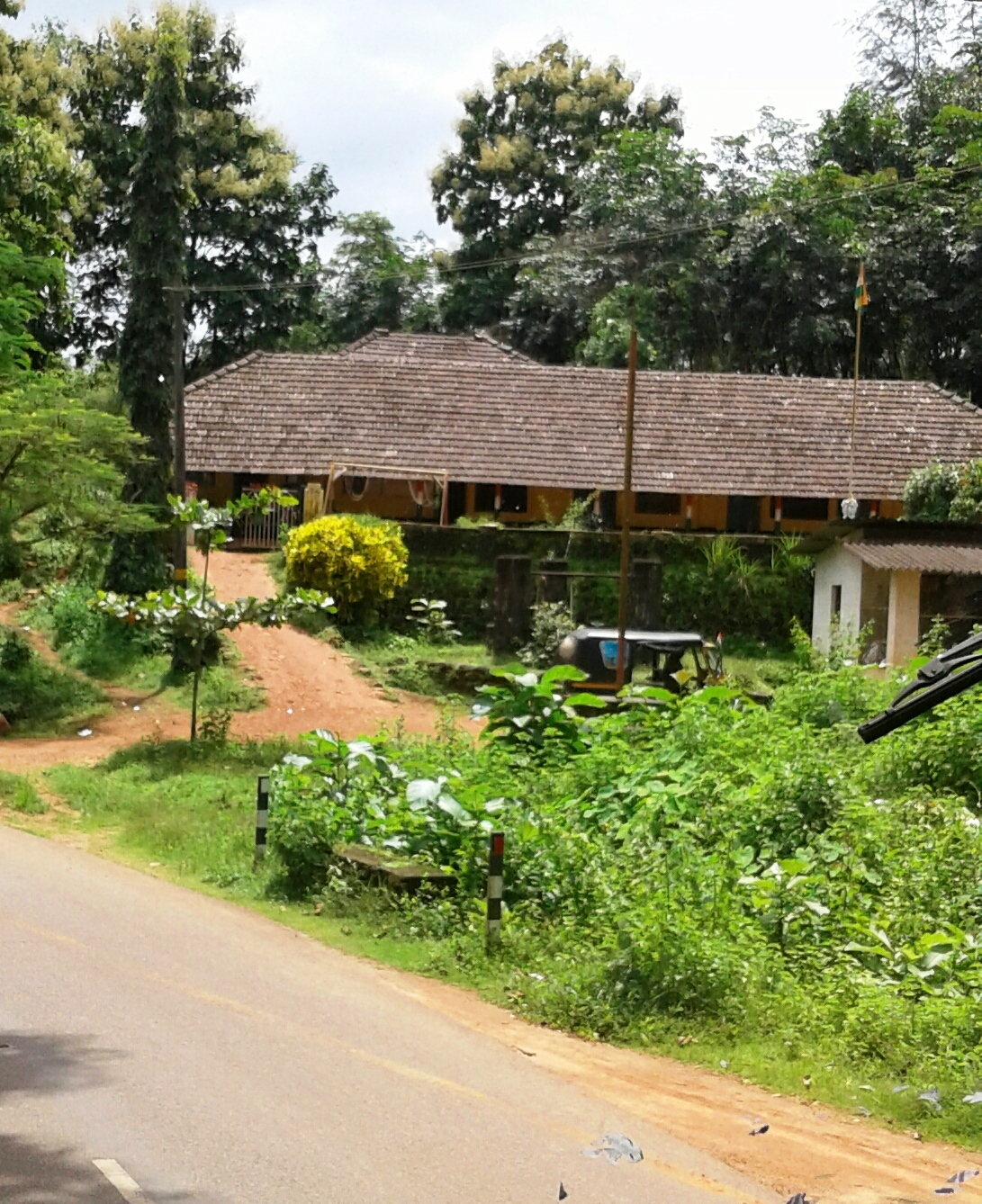
Panjikal School

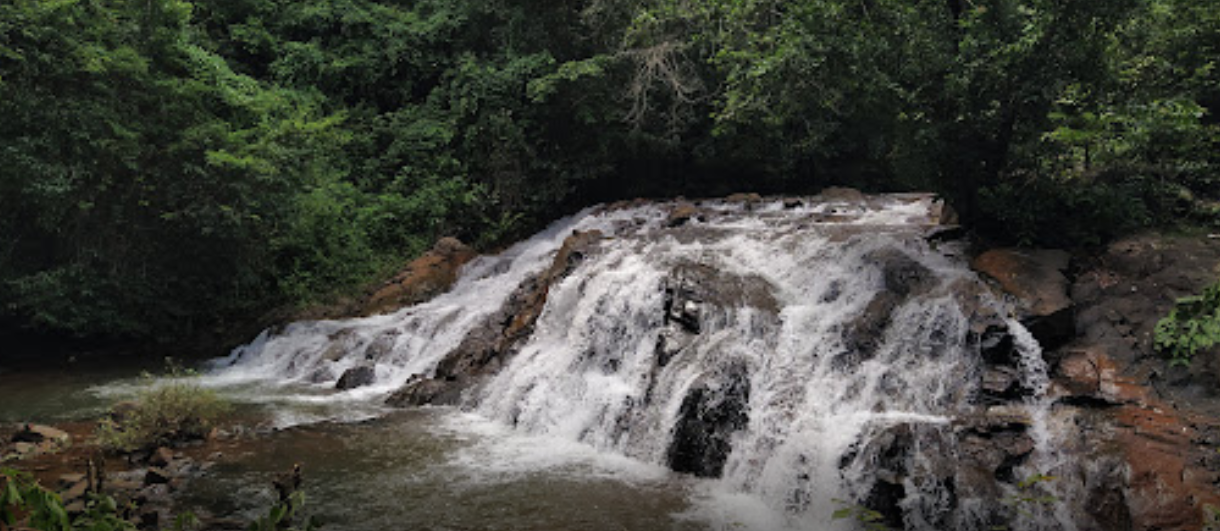
Kemanaballi Waterfalls

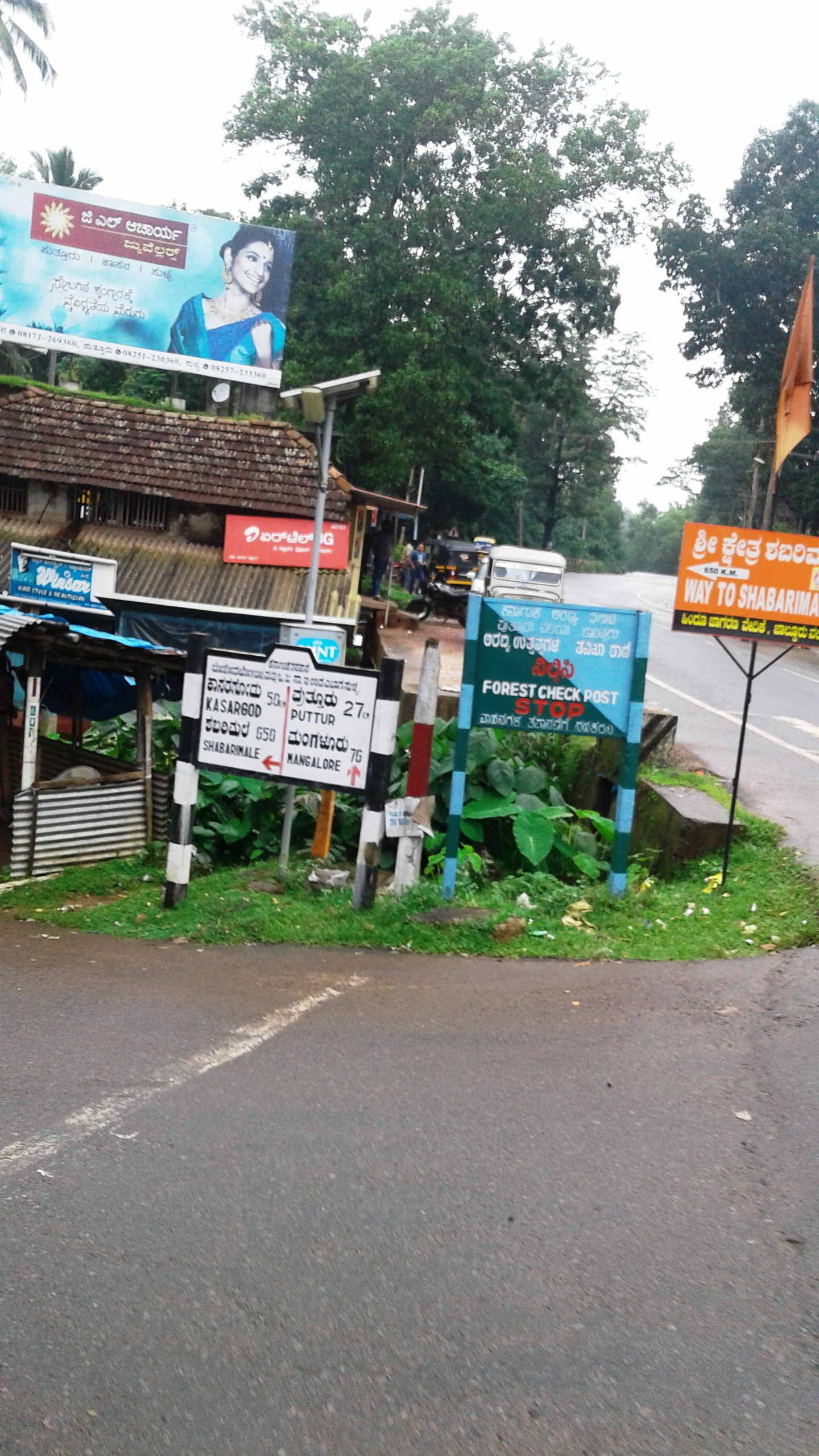
Jalsoor Junction

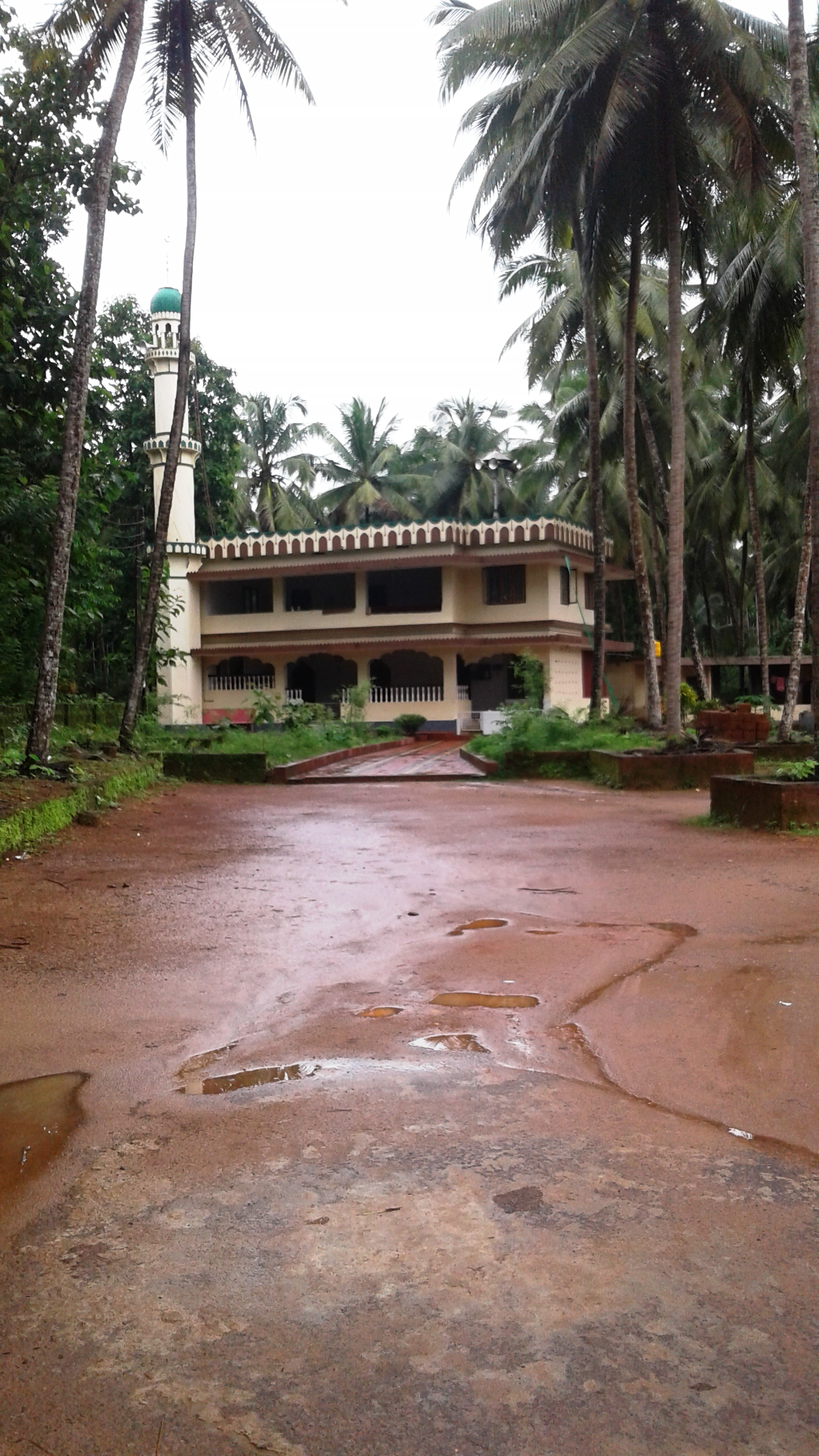
Jalsoor Mosque

== See also ==
- Dakshina Kannada
- Districts of Karnataka
