= Sindhi High School, Hebbal =

Location
- Hebbal, Bangalore; India
- 13.050556°N 77.598333°E

Information
- Motto: From Darkness unto Light
- Established: 2003
- Principal: Smt. Rachna Sharma
- Affiliation: Central Board of Secondary Education (CBSE)
- Website: https://sindhischoolhebbal.com/

Sindhi High School is an educational institution in Kempapura near Hebbal, situated in the city of Bangalore, India. Sindhi High School is run by the Sindhi Seva Samiti.It follows CBSE Syllabus.It is ranked among the top 10 CBSE schools in Bangalore.

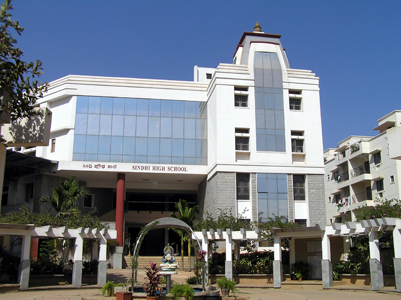
The SHS Building

== History ==
Sindhi Seva Samiti extended its vision of providing education at an affordable price by starting a school at Hebbal. This school was started on 9 June 2003 with a strength of 1165 pupils.

Sindhi High School at Hebbal was inaugurated on June 9, 2003 by the Deputy Prime Minister, Sri L.K.Advani in the presence of the Chief Minister Sri S.M.Krishna and other dignitaries. This initiative of Sindhi Seva Samiti was an extension of their vision of providing education at an affordable price.

Sindhi High School, Hebbal is a co-educational Day School affiliated to Central Board of Secondary Education, New Delhi. English is the medium of instruction and the curriculum envisages core subjects i.e. Science, Mathematics, Social studies, English and languages – Hindi / Kannada/ Sanskrit, in addition to general subjects like Computer Science, Art, Music, Dance, Yoga and Work experience. The emphasis is on a child centered approach that encourages the realization of each individual’s potential through co-curricular activities like debating, cartoon drawing, origami, poetry recitation, collage designing, vegetable carving, mono acting, rangoli, fancy dress etc.,

More importantly the school promotes social awareness, duty consciousness and team work forming an integral part of education. Functions are also celebrated to promote the spirit of National feeling, commemorate special days and provide a forum for pupils to exhibit their talents.

The school started with a record strength of 1165 pupils from Nursery to Class-XII and in a span of nineteen years, the strength has gone up to 2270. Pupils are grouped into 4 houses:

- Venus – Vivacious Versatility
- Earth – Abundant Adaptability
- Jupiter – Powerful Prudence
- Neptune - Teaming Tranquility

Various competitions – Inter class / Inter house activities are regularly conducted. These activities decide to declare `The Best House’ every academic year.

== See also ==
- Vidyashilp Academy
- Trio World Academy
- Mallya Aditi International School
