= Akkihebbal =

Akkihebbalu
- Hobli
- Interactive map of Akkihebbalu
- Coordinates: 12.62197°N 76.39423°E
- Country: India
- State: Karnataka
- District: Mandya
- Taluk: K R Pete

Government
  - Body: Village Panchayat

Area
  - Total: 5.33 km^{2} (2.06 sq mi)
- Elevation: 804 m (2,638 ft)

Population (2011)
  - Total: 3,946
  - Density: 740/km^{2} (1,920/sq mi)

Languages
  - Official: Kannada
- Time zone: UTC+5:30 (IST)
- Postal code: 571605
- Vehicle registration: KA-54, KA-11
- Nearest city: Mandya

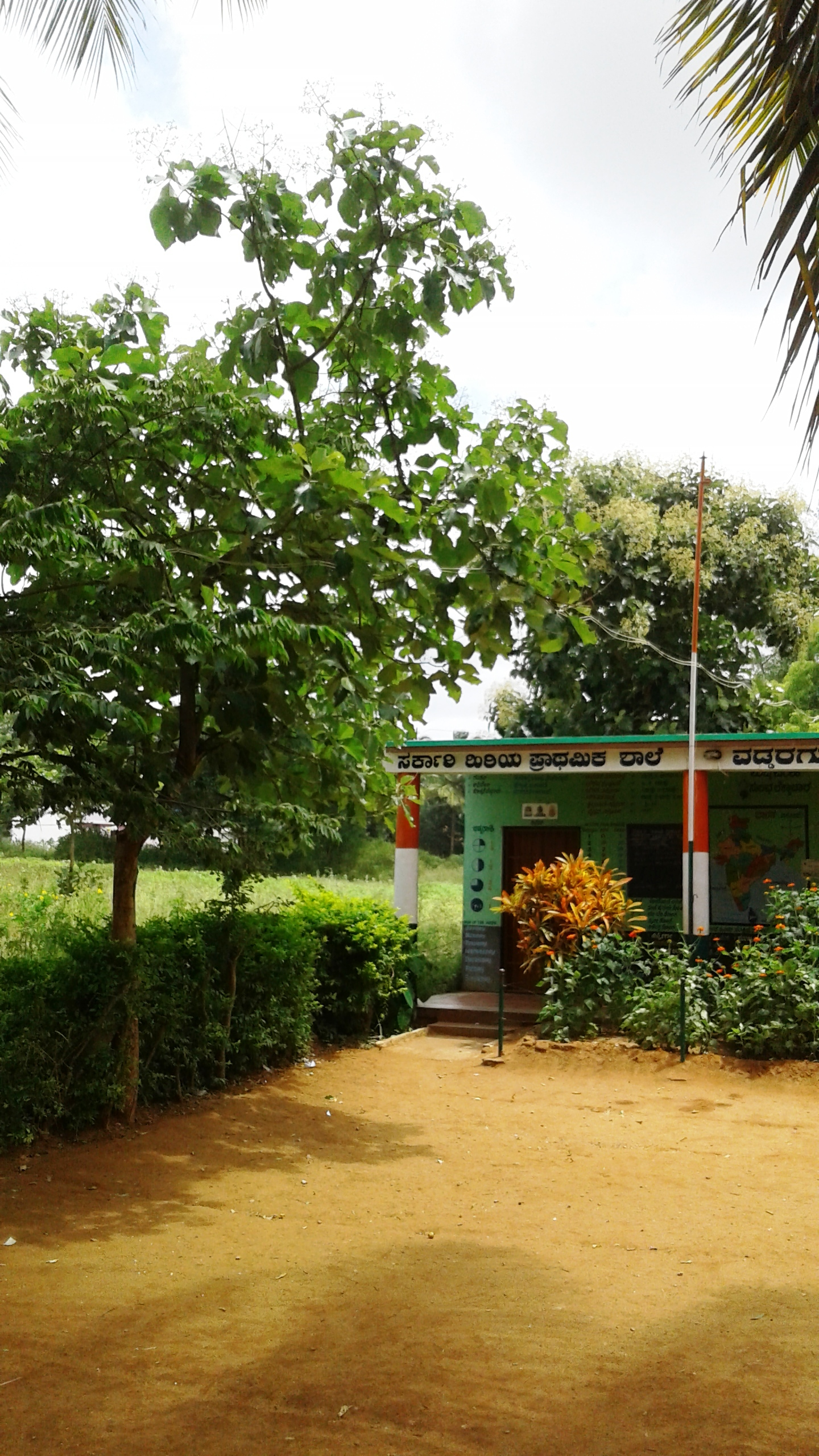
Akkihabblu School

Akkihebbalu is a Hobli in the southern state of Karnataka, India. It is located in the Krishnarajpet taluk of Mandya district in Karnataka.

It has an 800 year old Lakshmi Narasimha Swamy temple constructed by Goutama Maharshi. Rathotsava is celebrated every year in the month of February. Near to that a very old Eeshwara temple (Konkaneshwara) is located.

Akkihebbalu is connected by road(R) and rail(T) to Mysore(R&T), Hassan(R&T), Mandya(R) and Bangalore(R). It is located 55 km from Mandya, 64 km from Mysore, 61 km from Hassan and it is 168 km from Bangalore, via Somwarpet - Magadi Road.

The railway station of Akkihebbalu (station code: AKK) falls under the jurisdiction of Mysore division of South-western Railway and is the closest (16 km) railway station to Krishnarajapete.

== Image gallery ==
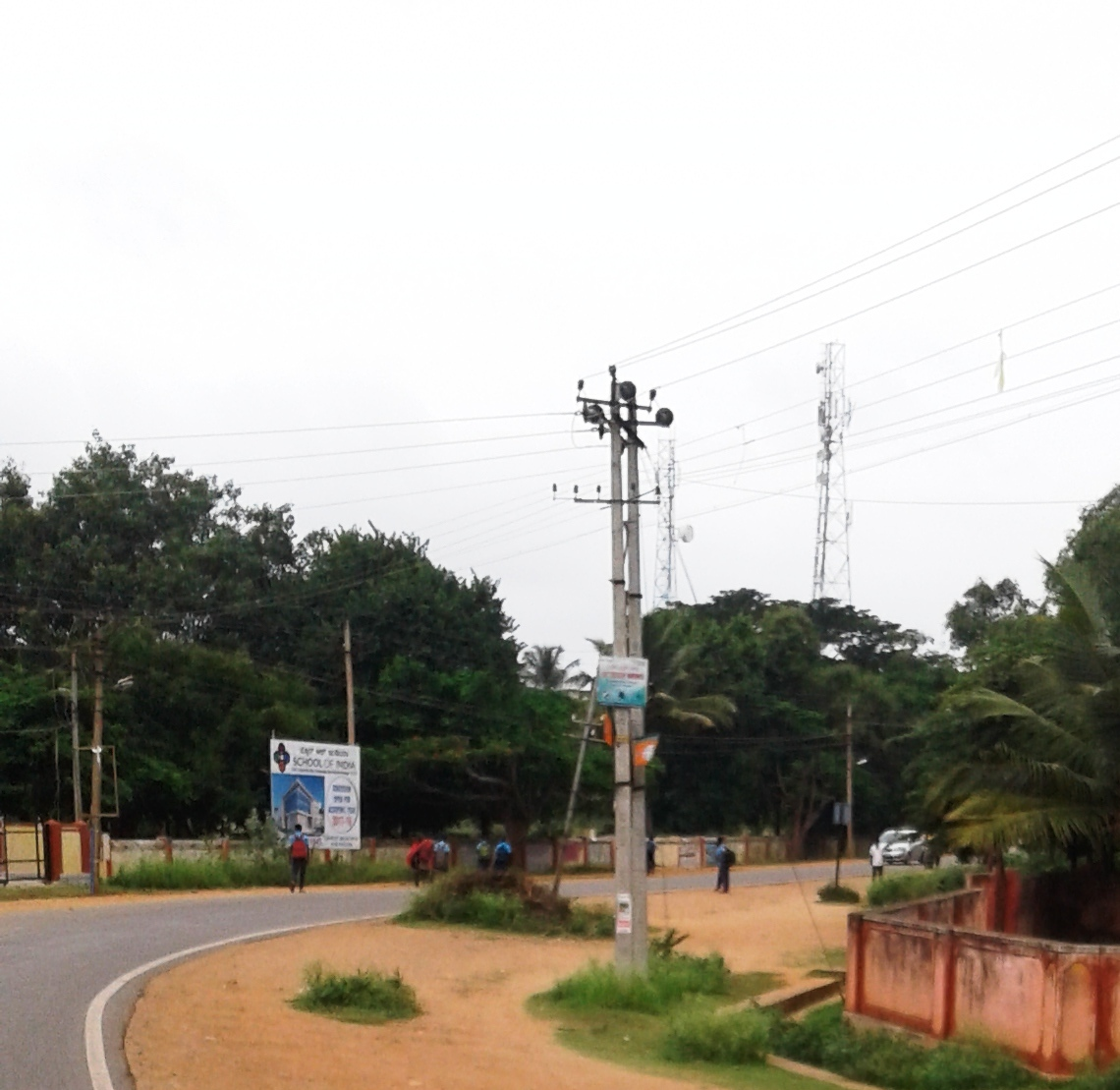
Main Road

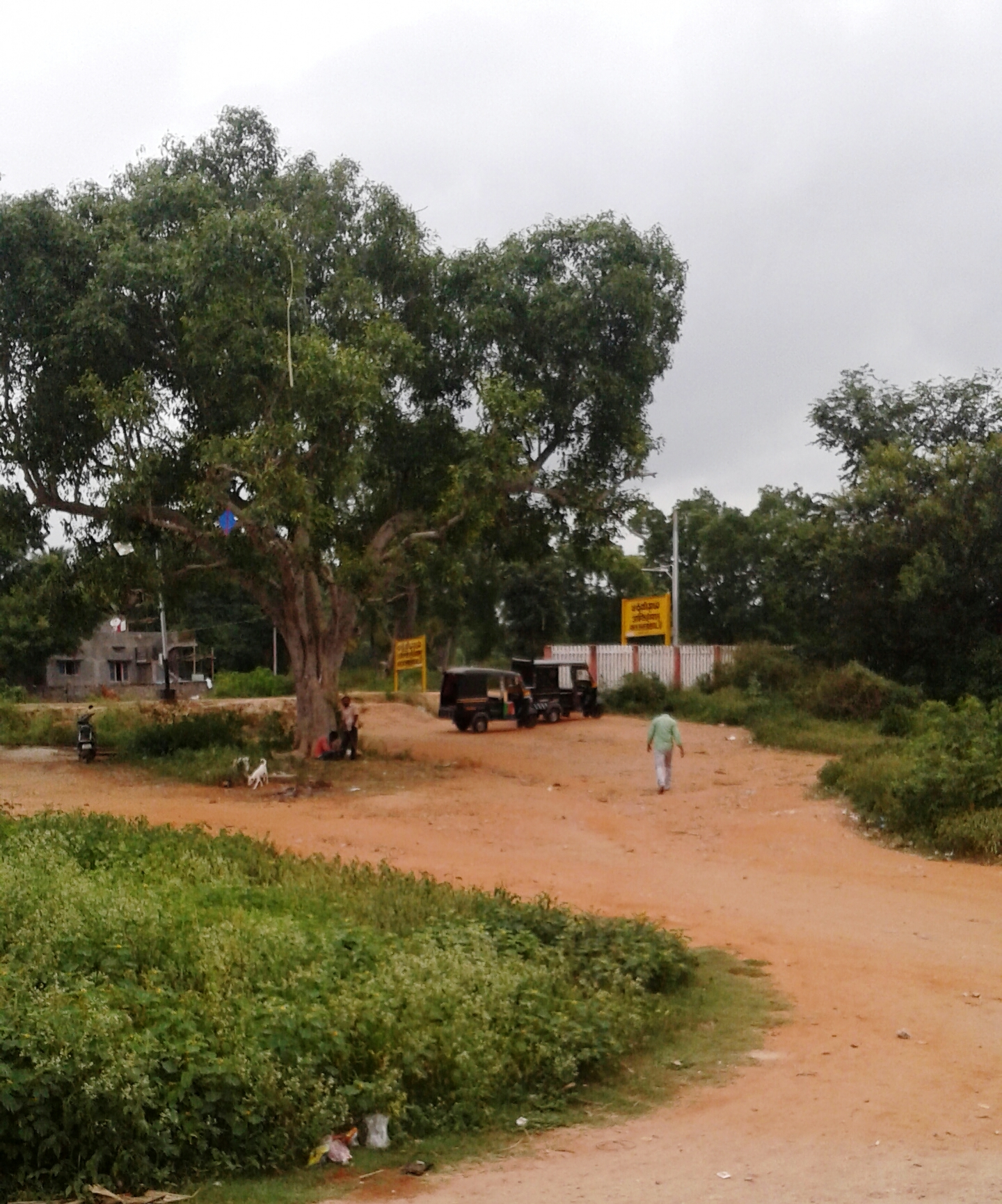
Railway Station
