= Hebbal, Khanapur =

Village in Karnataka, India

Hebbal Kannada pronunciation: [belagɔm]
- Village
- Interactive map of Hebbal
- Coordinates: 15°35′46″N 74°33′32″E
- Country: India
- State: Karnataka
- District: Belagavi
- Taluka: Khanapur

Area
  - Total: 900.25 ha (2,224.6 acres)
- Elevation: 651 m (2,136 ft)

Population (2011)
  - Total: 2,026
  - Density: 225.0/km^{2} (582.9/sq mi)

Hebbal is a village in Khanapur taluka of Belgavi district, Karnataka, India. Its village code is 597576.

== Census ==
=== 2011 Census ===
The village is home to 464 families. According to the Population Census of 2011, the village has a total population of 2026, consisting of 1014 males and 1012 females.

Within the village, there are 169 children aged 0–6, accounting for 8.34% of the total population. The average sex ratio in Hebbal is 998, which is higher than the state average of 973. However, the child sex ratio in Hebbal, as per the census, is 837, lower than the Karnataka average of 948.

In 2011, the literacy rate in Hebbal village was 76.31%, surpassing the state average of 75.36%. The male literacy rate in Hebbal is 89.91%, while the female literacy rate stands at 62.89%. There are 116 villagers of scheduled caste.
