= Jakkur =

Coordinates: 13°05′N 77°36′E

- Suburb
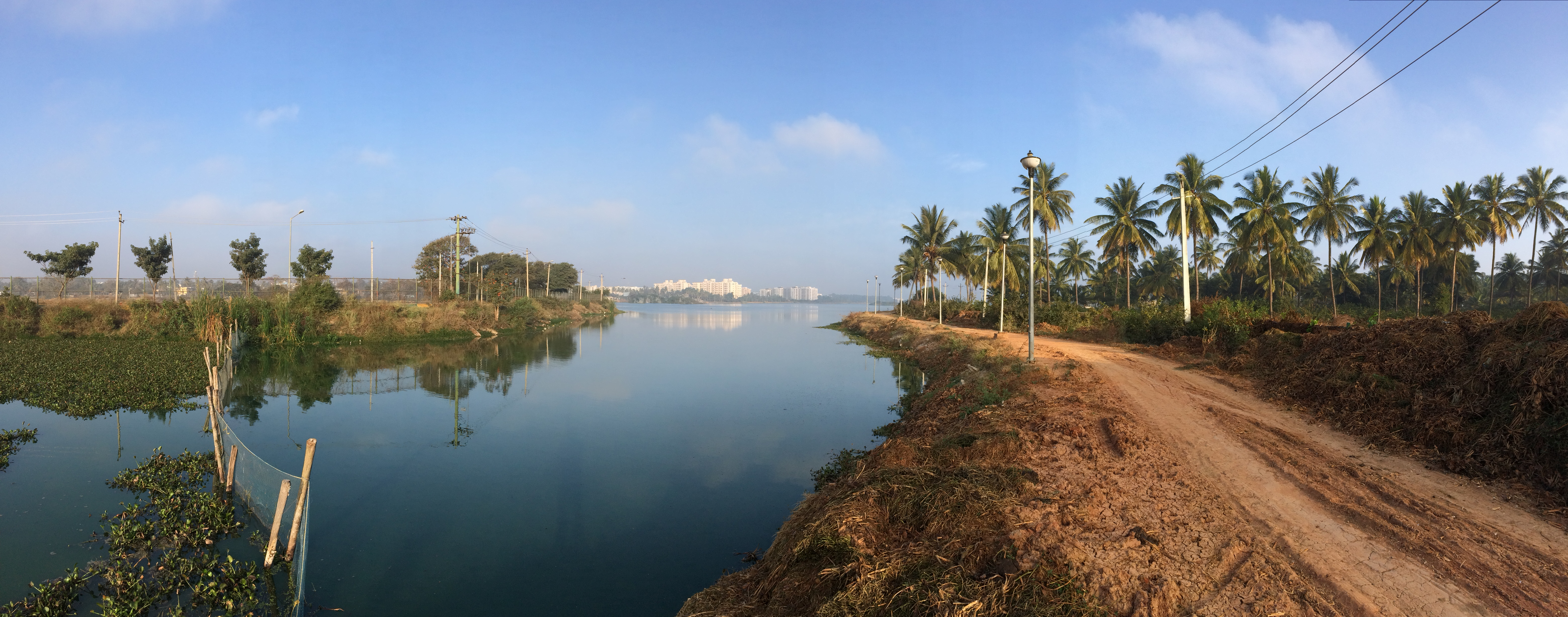
- Jakkur Lake
- Interactive map of Jakkur
- Country: India
- State: Karnataka
- Metro: Bangalore

Government
  - Type: Municipal Corporation
  - Body: Bruhat Bengaluru Mahanagara Palike

Area
  - Total: 23.96 km^{2} (9.25 sq mi)

Population (2011)
  - Total: 20,964
  - Density: 875.0/km^{2} (2,266/sq mi)

Languages
  - Official: Kannada
- Time zone: UTC+5:30 (IST)
- PIN: 560064

Jakkur (also spelled Jakkuru) is a suburb in the northern part of Bangalore, Karnataka, India. Located on the eastern side of the National Highway 44 between Yelahanka and Hebbal, the area is best known for the Jakkur Aerodrome and Jakkur Lake.

== Jakkur Aerodrome ==
The Jakkur Aerodrome, spread over 200 acres, was opened in 1948 and is the only dedicated general aviation field in the city. The Government Flying Training School (GFTS), one of the oldest flying schools in the country, is located in Jakkur.

== Jakkur Lake ==
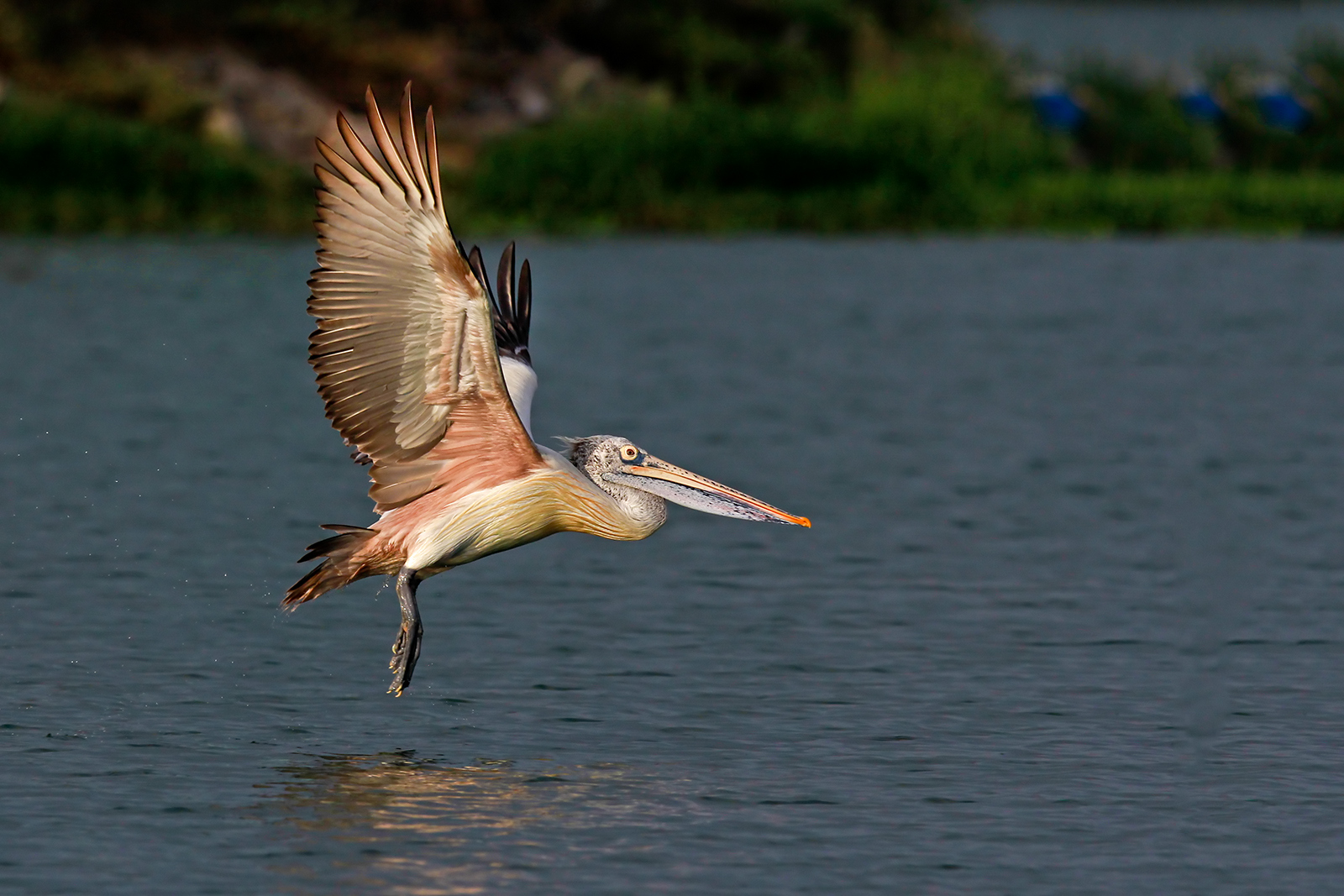
A spot-billed pelican taking off at the Jakkur Lake.

The Jakkur Lake is a 160-acre lake constructed over two centuries ago to cater to the water requirements of the Jakkur village. The lake, which was highly polluted by sewage and waste in 2005, was revived by treating the sewage water which enters the lake and then passing it through a man-made constructed wetland before it flowed through an algae pound that removed most of the nitrates and phosphates. However, in 2016, it was reported that the water quality has worsened due to increased levels of nitrates, phosphates, ammonia and algae.

The lake is also a source of drinking water for nearby villages that do not have access to Cauvery water. The lake used to attract a large number of migratory birds from other countries and has seen a fall in this number in recent years. Since the rejuvenation of the lake, there was an increase in the fish population in the lake, resulting in the nesting of water birds such as the pelicans.

== See also ==
- Jakkur, Bengaluru Inscriptions
