= Jakkur Lake =

Among the biggest lakes in Bangalore

- Location within Karnataka
- Location: Bangalore, Karnataka
- Coordinates: 13°05′05.9″N 77°36′40.7″E
- Type: Stalewater
- Primary inflows: Rainfall and city drainage
- Primary outflows: Nala
- Basin countries: India
- Islands: several islands
- Settlements: Bangalore

Jakkur Lake is among the biggest lakes in Bangalore, and is located on the northern side of the city. It derives its name from the name of the locality, Jakkur. It is spread around 35 ha (86.5 acres) and has several islands.

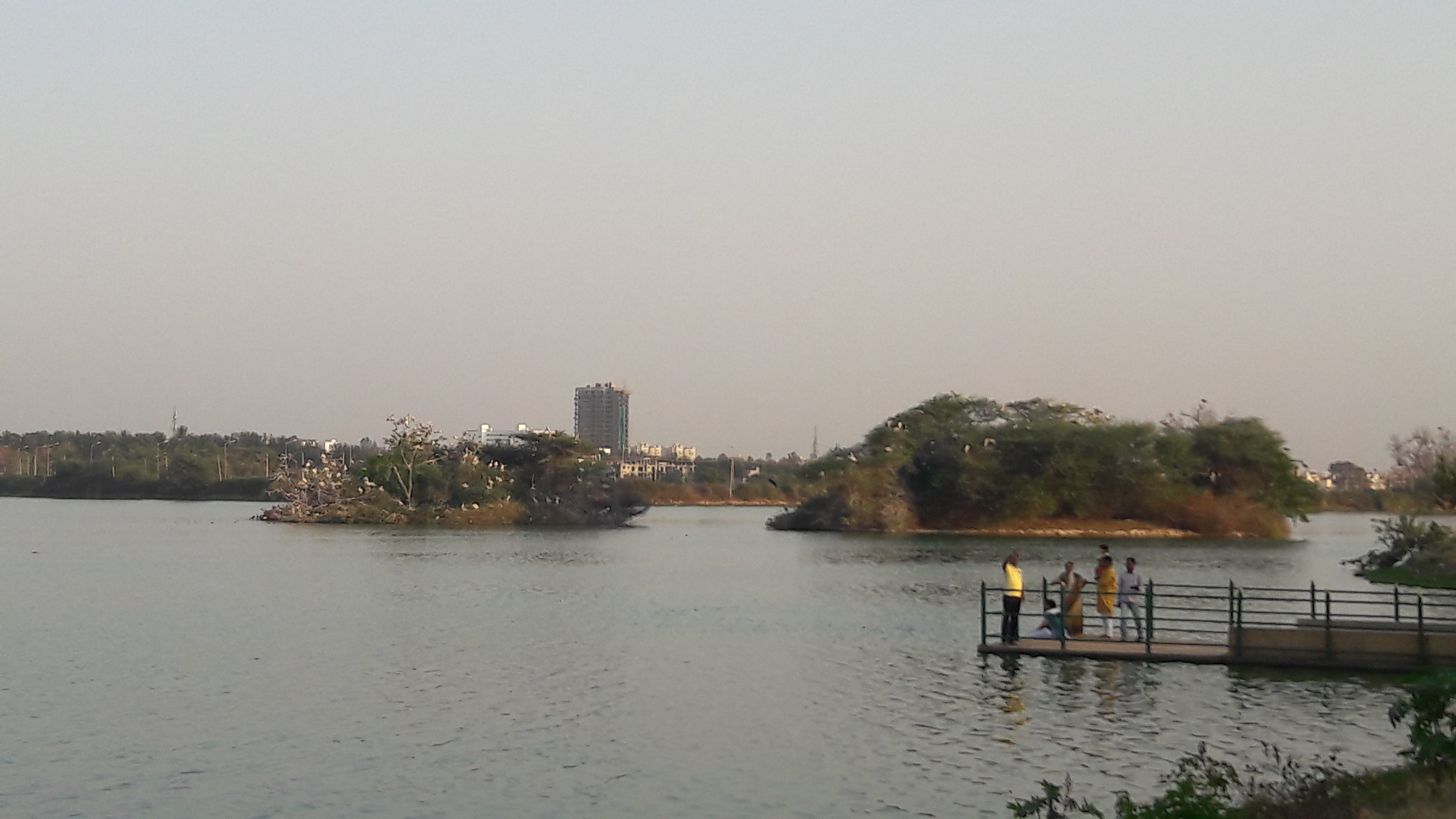
A view of Jakkur Lake

Jakkur Lake is one among the various lakes in Northern Bangalore preferred by various walkers and joggers and is a Bird paradise because of its several islands in the middle of the lake. It is open for everybody in two shifts during a day and those are towards the morning 6:00 AM till 9:00 AM IST (Indian_Standard_Time) and towards the evening 4:00 PM till 7:00 PM IST.

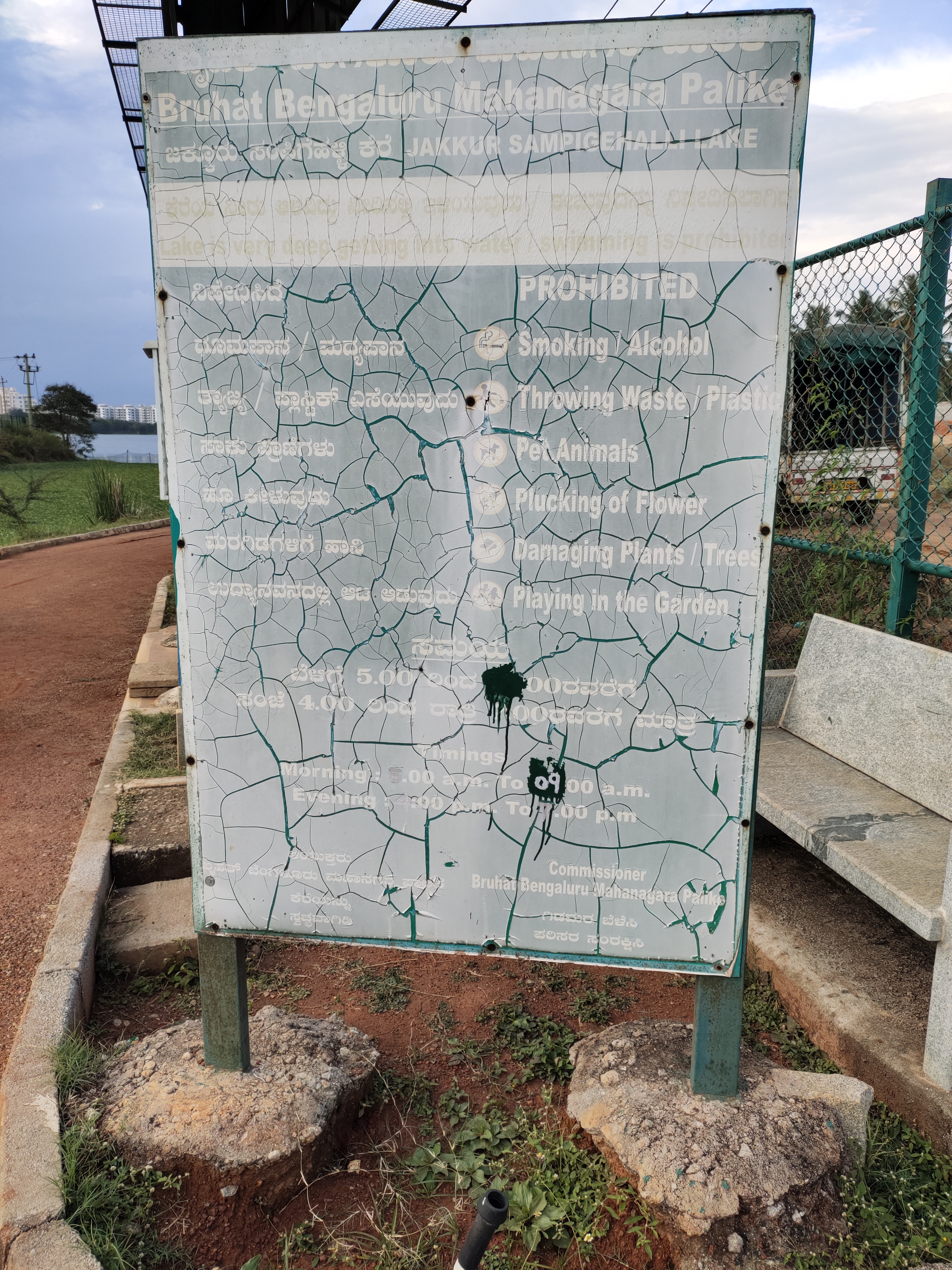
BBMP Information Banner in Jakkur Lake

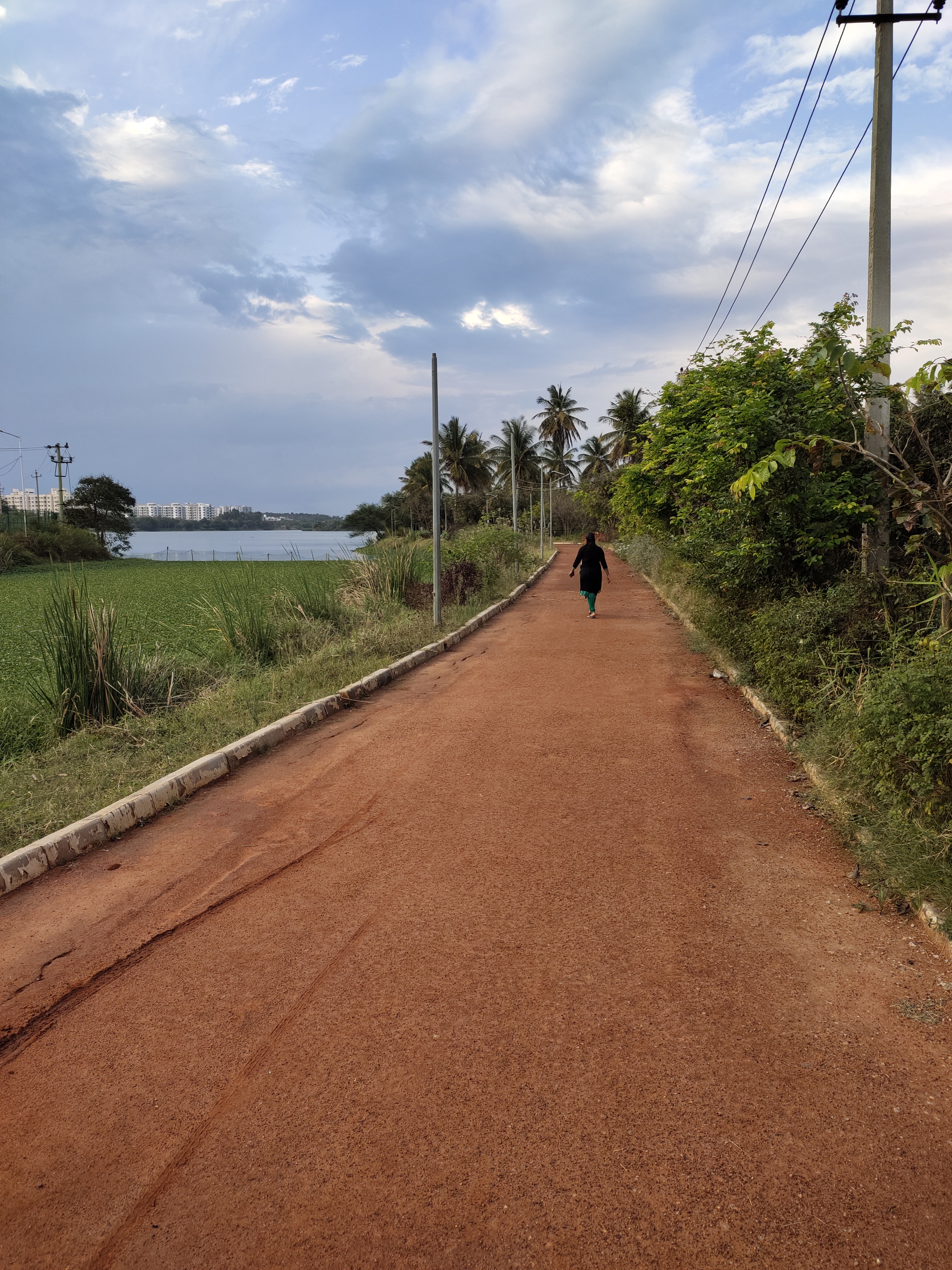
A walker in Jakkur lake

The approximate periphery of the Jakkur Lake is around 4.0 Km and some joggers prefer to go on and cover the complete periphery couple of times for exercise and also to view several species of trees, plants and get a sight of many species of birds along.

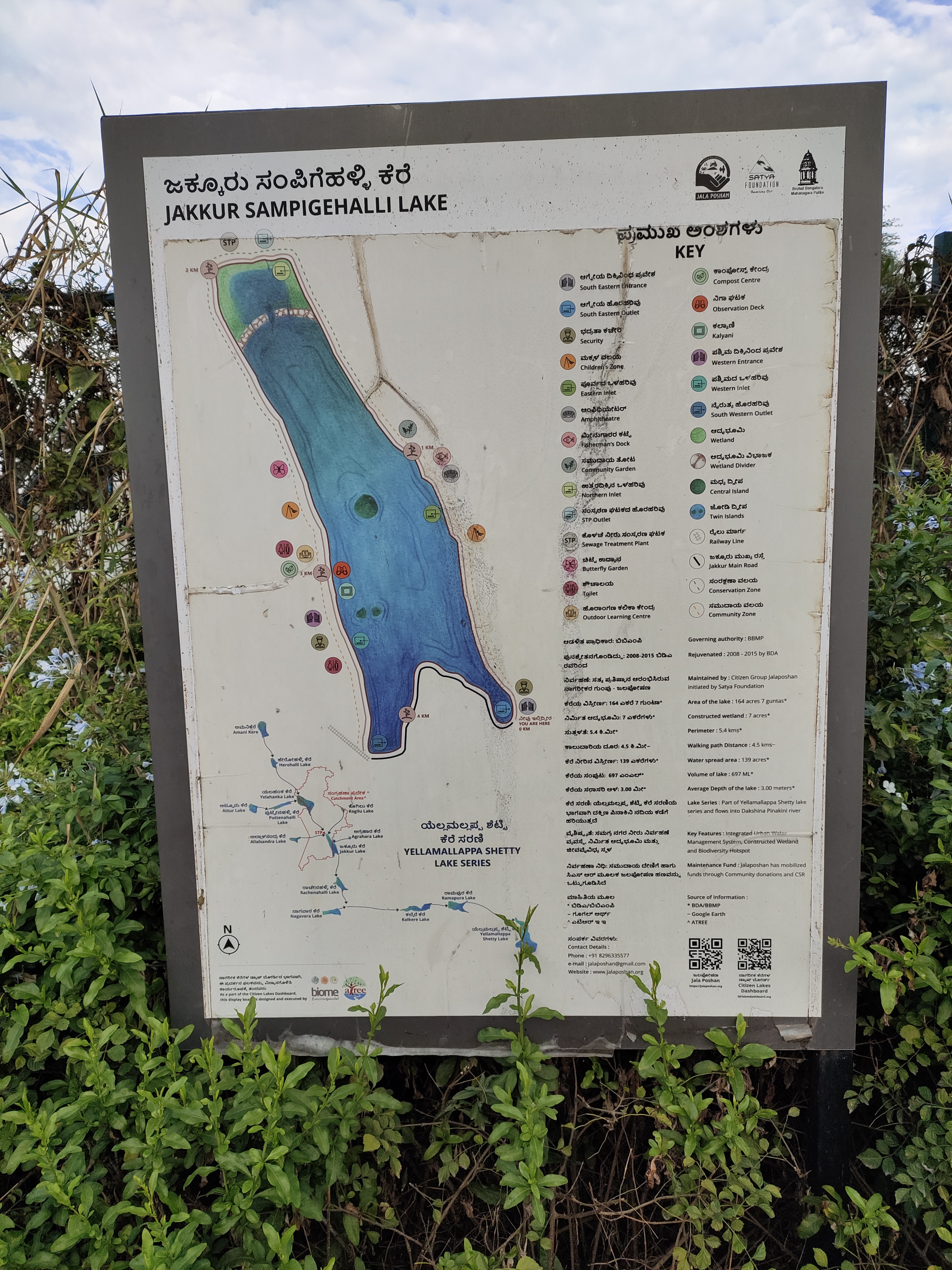
Banner showing periphery and hotspots in Jakkur Lake
