= Yadgud =

- Village
- Location in Karnataka, India Yadgud (India)
- Coordinates: 16°19′N 74°36′E
- Country: India
- State: Karnataka
- District: Belgaum
- Talukas: Hukeri

Government
  - Body: Yadagud gram panchayat

Languages
  - Official: Kannada
- Time zone: UTC+5:30 (IST)
- Postal code: 591309
- Vehicle registration: KA49

Yadgud is a village in Belgaum district in the southern state of Karnataka, India.
