= Hebbal, Hukkeri =

Village in Karnataka, India

Hebbal or Hebbal (N) is a small village of around 1500 houses in Hukkeri taluk Belgaum district, Karnataka, India on the banks of the Hiranyakeshi river. The Bangalore-Pune National Highway passes through it.
