= Aduvalli =

Aduvalli may refer to:

- Aduvalli (Belur), a village in Karnataka, India
- Aduvalli (Hassan), a village in Karnataka, India
- Aduvalli (Narasimharajapura), a village in Karnataka, India
