= Adihalli =

Adihalli may refer to places in India:

- Adihalli (Arsikere), Hassan District, Karnataka
- Adihalli (Channarayapatna), Hassan District, Karnataka
- Adihalli (Krishnarajpet), Mandya District, Karnataka
