= Nonavinakere =

Nonavinakere Nonavinakere Makshikapuri
- village
- Location in Karnataka, India Nonavinakere (India)
- Coordinates: 13.15°N 76.55°E
- Country: India
- State: Karnataka
- District: Tumkur

Government
  - Type: Hobli

Population
  - Total: 4,500−5,000

Languages
  - Official: Kannada
- Time zone: UTC+5:30 (IST)
- Postal code: 572224

Nonavinakere is located in Tumkur District of Karnataka. It is around 64 km south-west of Tumkur and 12 km west of Turuvekere. Its Pincode is 572224.

Tiptur Railway Station and Banasandra Railway Station are the nearest railheads. Bangalore International Airport is the nearest airport.

In Nonavinakere there are two famous temples one is Beteraya swamy and Venugopala swamy out of which Gopala Krishna swamy temple was built during the Chalukya dynasty. A car festival for the temples is held during March–April.

Nonavinakere has a large pond that is about 9 kilometres (5.6 mi) in diameter. In some seasons, the pond overflows through the surrounding countryside. the pond will be very good to see when it overflows.

Nonavinkere there is another famous temple kadasiddeshwara math its related to someshwara god.
