= Banasandra railway station =

Railway station in Karnataka

Banasandra

General information
- Location: State Highway 19, Turuvekere, Banasandra, Tumakuru district, Karnatak; India
- Coordinates: 13°15′55″N 76°39′34″E
- Elevation: 817 metres (2,680 ft)
- System: Indian Railways station
- Owner: Indian Railways
- Operator: South Western Railway
- Line: Bangalore–Arsikere–Hubli line
- Platforms: 3
- Tracks: Double Electric-Line

Construction
- Structure type: Standard (on ground)

Other information
- Status: Functioning
- Station code: BSN
- Zone(s): South Western Railway
- Division(s): Mysore

Services
Preceding station	Indian Railways	Following station
Ammasandra towards ?	South Western Railway zone Bangalore–Arsikere–Hubli line	Aralaguppe towards ?
Location
- Interactive map

Banasandra railway station is a railway station in located on Bangalore–Arsikere–Hubli railway line operated by the South Western Railway zone under Mysore railway division. It is situated at State Highway 19 at Turuvekere, Banasandra in Tumakuru district in the Indian state of Karnatak.
