= Somanath (disambiguation) =

Somanath is a temple in Veraval, Gujarat, India.

Somanath or Somnath may also refer to:

== People ==
- Mekapotula Somanath, an Indian art director
- S. Somanath, an Indian aerospace engineer
- Somnath Awghade, an Indian actor
- Somnath Sharma, a First recipient of the Param Vir Chakra
- Somnath Ghosh, an American professor of Mechanical Engineering
- Somnath Waghmare, an Indian documentary filmmaker
- Somnath Hore, an Indian Artist
- Somnath Rath, an Indian politician

== Places ==
- Gir Somnath, a district of Gujarat
- Somanath, Dahanu, a village in Maharashtra, India

== Transport ==
- Somnath Superfast Express, an express train of the Indian Railways
- Somnath railway station, a railway in Veraval

== Other ==
- Somnath Assembly constituency

== See also ==
- Somanathapura (disambiguation)
