= Chennakeshava Temple =

Chennakeshava Temple may refer to the following buildings in Karnataka, India:

- Chennakeshava Temple, Aralaguppe
- Chennakeshava Temple, Belur
- Chennakeshava Temple, Hullekere
- Chennakeshava Temple, Somanathapura
- Chennakeshava Temple, Turuvekere

== See also ==
- Somanathapura (disambiguation)
- Chennakesava Perumal Temple, Hindu temple in Tamil Nadu, India
- Nageshvara-Chennakeshava Temple complex, Mosale
- Chennakesava Reddy, a 2002 Indian Telugu-language film by V. V. Vinayak
