= Kanathur =

Kanathur may refer to:

- Kanathur (Chennai), a southern coastal neighbourhood of Chennai, India
- Kanathur, Tumkur, a village in Karnataka, India
- former name of Kannur Municipality, Kerala, India
