= Mysore Cements Limited =

Mysore Cements Limited(Current Name: Mycem, HeidelbergCement)
- Company type: Private
- Traded as: BSE: 500292; NSE: HEIDELBERG
- Industry: Cement
- Founded: 1959
- Headquarters: Gurgaon, Haryana, India
- Number of locations: Ammasandra, Karnataka, India Narsingarh, Madhya Pradesh, India Madora, Uttar Pradesh, India Raigad, Maharashtra, India
- Key people: Founder: Sarangapani Mudaliar, Nandlal Hamirwasia, S.K Birla, Sushil Kumar Tiwari – Whole time director
- Operating income: 23,713.8 Million Rupees (March 2015)
- Net income: 20,442.8 Million Rupees (March 2015)
- Total assets: 20,792.3 Million Rupees (March 2015)
- Owner: Heidelberg Cement, Germany from 2006
- Number of employees: ~ 5000
- Subsidiaries: Diamond Cement
- Website: www.mycemco.com

Mysore Cements Limited (also known as Diamond Cement) is one of major producers of Cement in south India since its establishment in 1958 – 59 by Karnataka-based industrialist Sarangapani Mudaliar and by collaboration of Kaisers USA as a Public Limited Company The company produced its major output of 1 ton cement with the investment of about 20 million Rupees, in 1962. MCL was immediately taken over by Kaisers and G.D Birla and from then the following years company started producing more cement and it was 4 tpa by the end of year 1968. With an investment of 23 million, MCL produced 6 tpa of cement in Ammasandra unit Based in Tumkur District of Karnataka State. After the death of G.D Birla, in 1983 MCL was totally under control of Birlas and Shri. S.K Birla, grandson of GD Birla was declared the chairman of the organisation.

Further MCL was further established to northern part of India with its plants in Damoh in Madhya Pradesh and Jhansi in Uttar Pradesh. But Ammasandra plant was modernised by the investment of around 350 million rupees. In 2006/07 MCL was taken over by the world's third largest cement producer HeidelbergCement.

== Early years ==
Diamond Cement Logo used until 2006

MCL was in boom after it was taken over by Birla group of companies. Ammasandra, the area where the factory was located was named as Aditya Pattana named after Aditya Birla. MCL reached its peak position under the leadership of Nandalal Hamirwasia who was President & M.D and Nirbhaya Lodha who was Executive Director of the organisation from 1990s to 2006. Under Mr. Hamirwasia and Mr. Lodha, the facts say that MCL used to produce 1500–2000 metric tons of cement per day. MCL, Ammasandra was well equipped and the location was well planned, since Limestone was available very near around a distance of 10–15 km near a place called Ramapura and also Ammasandra was well reachable by Railway transport as well.

Initially MCL Ammasandra use to produce only Cement and later it was adapted to produce Clinker from the early 1980s. Now it produces two products which are Portland slag cement(43 grade) and Portland pozzolana cement.

The facility at Narsingarh was set up by Shyam Bagrodia, who was then designated as the Joint President. He improvised the clinkerisation capacity of Damohto 1 million tpa by installing another state of art 6 stage preheater kiln at an investment of Rs. 800 million in Jhansi. This was commissioned in 1989, which helped not only in improving the operational efficiency but also in reducing the coal consumption and enhanced productivity. Further, a green field 500,000 tpa grinding unit was also installed at Jhansi, UP by the investment of 590 million rupees which was also completed in July 1989 Jhansi was an ideal location for Diamond cement, since UP was one of the states which consumes more cement in India but with very little production capacity. This added advantage for MCL was a well thought out plan of the management team.

== Infrastructure and development ==
Due to its Presence, MCL gave Ammasandra good infrastructure and jobs for many people in and out of the village. At one time it was serving nearly 3500 – 4000 real time employees, who worked on a daily shift basis. MCL provided its employees a no-cost Middle Class Hospital, Employee state Insurance Dispensary(ESIC) and a Society offering a variety of rations to employees in exchange for both cash and credit.

MCL has also its own School and Pre-university College for its employees and nearby residents at a lower cost than outside schools. It is known by the name, Mycemco Junior College and English School. It was one of the top schools and colleges in the entire Tumkur District during its peak period. For some decades, this was the only school which had English school in whole Taluk. Every MCL plant have medical centre with ambulance facility.

Apart from these MCL also provided its employees with recreation club, a park, a small zoo and also houses for its employees to stay near by the factory itself with low rent and continuously available electricity.

MCL created little pollution as little waste was released. Moreover, smoke and dust released through electrostatic precipitators, which used to cause less air pollution.

By the early 1990s the company Damoh plant was clinkerised and the capacity was increased by 10 lac tpa with an investment of 500 million rupees. With this MCL achieved its highest peak of 2 million tpa in the year 1990, standing only second behind ACC cements. The capacity was increased 2.3 million tpa in 2004.

MCL Ammasandra had got 4 Kilns which were installed by the sum of 350 million rupees. It increased the productivity and also reduced the cost of production on power and fuel consumption. With four rotary kilns, MCL Ammasandra used to produce 1500–2000 metrics of clinker per day. All the clincker was stocked in the largest dome like structure called Reclaimber, which was operated on a single rail. Reclaimber was connected to railway tracks which helped in easy transportation. After many years, in early 2007–08, four rotary Kilns were reduced to two, one for clinker manufacturing and the other was modified for the production of Sponge Iron.

From early 2005, MCL also adapted to produce Sponge Iron, a raw form of iron from its ore. Initially it was successful, later it proved to be failure since it required much water due to the dust released in extraction. Sponge Iron was also sent to other divisions in Kerala, from where it was exported abroad. In 2011, MCL plants have produced and sold 2.81 Mtpa which is the highest-ever cement sales in the history of the company.

== Internal issues and conflicts ==
The serious conflicts outbursted between MCL Ammasandra Junior Officers and its management in 2001–02 which lead to the transfer of many officers to remote areas such as Damoh and Jhansi. There was also conflict between Management and its employees in 2002. The Employees started protesting against them for some of the illegal happenings related to salaries and other daily requirements. The company laid off the employees who were involved in the protest and also reduced some of the major facilities to them. Even closing school for 15 days and reducing the salaries for teachers. Teachers who were regarded as the best in whole Tumkur district were remained unpaid. This was later solved by the interventions of local MLA of Gubbi taluk SR Srinivas (Vasanna) and State government.

By the end of 2006, MCL was totally overtaken by Heidelberg's. Heidelberg's changed the name from MCL to Mycem, a Heidelberg Cement whereas Diamond Cement name has been retained in Damoh and Jhansi regions. Now selected employees are retained in the firm and major part apart from technical side all the other units have been given to contract, who work on daily basis. Apart from the Internal Issues, Local governments of Karnataka, MP and UP have filed some cases against MCL for its environment pollution activities in their respective states. However the issues are being solved subsequently.

== Current situation ==
Facilities for the expansion of capacity in central India is in full swing.

- Expansion of Clinker manufacturing units in Damoh, MP and Jhansi, UP from 1.2 MTPA to 3.1 MTPA.
- Expansion of Cement grinding capacity from 1 MTPA to 2 MTPA.
- MP Government has granted certain tax and other benefits for new line which will further enhance return on the project.
- New markets found in northern India.
- Approx.10–15 Million t of capacity is expected to be added during CY12. .Source: Industry estimates

== See also ==
- Ammasandra
- Heidelberg Cement
- Diamond Cement (Ghana) Limited (DCGL).
