= Kardi railway station =

Railway station in Karnataka

Kardi

General information
- Location: Kardi Cross Road, Madlehalli, Tumakuru district, Karnatak; India
- Coordinates: 13°16′03″N 76°34′25″E
- Elevation: 842 metres (2,762 ft)
- System: Indian Railways station
- Owner: Indian Railways
- Operator: South Western Railway
- Line: Bangalore–Arsikere–Hubli line
- Platforms: 3
- Tracks: Double Electric-Line

Construction
- Structure type: Standard (on ground)

Other information
- Status: Functioning
- Station code: RDI
- Zone(s): South Western Railway
- Division(s): Mysore

Services
Preceding station	Indian Railways	Following station
Aralaguppe towards ?	South Western Railway zone Bangalore–Arsikere–Hubli line	Banashankari Halt towards ?
Location
- Interactive map

Kardi railway station is a railway station in located on Bangalore–Arsikere–Hubli railway line operated by the South Western Railway zone under Mysore railway division. It is situated beside Kardi Cross Road at Madlehalli in Tumakuru district in the Indian state of Karnatak.
