= Ammasandra railway station =

Railway station in Karnataka

Ammasandra

General information
- Location: Ammasandra, Tumakuru district, Karnatak; India
- Coordinates: 13°15′52″N 76°42′41″E
- Elevation: 818 metres (2,684 ft)
- System: Indian Railways station
- Owner: Indian Railways
- Operator: South Western Railway
- Line: Bangalore–Arsikere–Hubli line
- Platforms: 1
- Tracks: Double Electric-Line

Construction
- Structure type: Standard (on ground)

Other information
- Status: Functioning
- Station code: AMSA
- Zone(s): South Western Railway
- Division(s): Mysore

Services
Preceding station	Indian Railways	Following station
Sampige Road towards ?	South Western Railway zone Bangalore–Arsikere–Hubli line	Banasandra towards ?
Location
- Interactive map

Ammasandra railway station is a railway station in located on Bangalore–Arsikere–Hubli railway line operated by the South Western Railway zone under Mysore railway division. It is situated at Ammasandra in Tumakuru district in the Indian state of Karnatak.
