= Ammasandra =

- village
- Location in Karnataka, India Ammasandra (India)
- Coordinates: 13.2608°N 76.7055°E
- Country: India
- State: Karnataka
- District: Tumkur
- Named for: Dandinashivara is also a neighbor village to Ammasandra.

Government
  - Body: Gram panchayat

Population (2001)
  - Total: 4,236

Languages
  - Official: Kannada
- Time zone: UTC+5:30 (IST)
- ISO 3166 code: IN-KA
- Vehicle registration: KA
- Website: karnataka.gov.in

Ammasandra (sometimes referred to as Adityapatna) is a small township in Turuvekere taluk, Tumkur district in the state of Karnataka, India.

== Demographics ==
As of 2001 India census, workers. Ammasandra had a population of 4236. Males constitute 51% of the population and females 49%. Adityapatna has an average literacy rate of 82%, higher than the national average of 59.5%: with 54% of the males and 46% of females literate. In Ammasandra, 7% of the population is under 6 years of age.

== Transportation ==
Ammasandra railway station, located on Bangalore–Arsikere–Hubli railway line is the nearest railway connection of the area.
