= Kanathur, Tumkur =

Village in Karnataka state, India

Kanathur
- Village
- Location in Karnataka, India* Kanathur (India)
- Coordinates: 13.10°N 76.40°E
- Country: India
- State: Karnataka
- District: Tumkur
- Founder: Sage Kanva Maharshi

Government
  - Type: Panchayati raj (India)
  - Body: Gram panchayat
- Elevation: 794 m (2,605 ft)

Population (2001)
  - Total: 5,000

Languages
  - Official: Kannada
- Time zone: UTC+5:30 (IST)

Kanathur is a village in Turvekere taluk of Tumkur district, in the Indian state of Karnataka.

Kanathur is famous for its copra. Kanathur is also famous for its Gopala Swamy Temple.Nearby Aldalli, Turuvekere Taluk, Tumkur District. It is the birthplace of veteran stage artiste Master Hirannaiah's father K. Hirannaiah.

== Geography ==
Kanathur is located at 13.10°N 76.67°E. It has an average elevation of 794 metres (2604 feet). Turuvekere is around 12 km east of Kanathur. Tiptur Railway Station and Banasandra Railway Station are the nearest railheads. Bangalore International Airport is the nearest airport.

== Demographics ==
As of 2001 India census, Kanathur had a population of 5000. Males constitute ??% of the population and females ??%. Kanathur has an average literacy rate of ??%, higher/lower than the national average of 59.5%: male literacy is ??%, and female literacy is ??%. In Kanathur, ??% of the population is under 6 years of age.

== Temples ==
There is a Venugopala Swamy temple in the middle of the village. Hoysala Temples Near Kanathur are Kalleshwara temple and Chenna Keshava temple at Thandaga village.

== Agriculture ==
The primary occupation in the village is growing copra which has the local market in Tiptur. Farmers also grow ragi, mulberry, mango, & various types of vegetables. The main channel of Hemavati River which goes to Nagamangala passes near the village.
