= Sampige Road railway station =

Railway station in Karnataka

Sampige Road

General information
- Location: Channavaderahalli, Tumakuru district, Karnatak; India
- Coordinates: 13°16′13″N 76°45′40″E
- Elevation: 820 metres (2,690 ft)
- System: Indian Railways station
- Owner: Indian Railways
- Operator: South Western Railway
- Line: Bangalore–Arsikere–Hubli line
- Platforms: 2
- Tracks: Double Electric-Line

Construction
- Structure type: Standard (on ground)

Other information
- Status: Functioning
- Station code: SPGR
- Zone(s): South Western Railway
- Division(s): Bangalore

Services
Preceding station	Indian Railways	Following station
Nittur towards ?	South Western Railway zone Bangalore–Arsikere–Hubli line	Ammasandra towards ?
Location
- Interactive map

Sampige Road railway station is a railway station in located on Bangalore–Arsikere–Hubli railway line operated by the South Western Railway zone under Bangalore railway division. It is situated at Channavaderahalli in Tumakuru district in the Indian state of Karnatak.
