= B.Kanabur =

- village
- Location in Karnataka, India B.Kanabur (India)
- Coordinates: 13.61°N 75.53°E
- Country: India
- State: Karnataka
- District: Chikkamagaluru
- Talukas: Narasimharajapura

Population (2011)
  - Total: 11,137

Languages
  - Official: Kannada
- Time zone: UTC+5:30 (IST)

B.Kanabur is a village in the southern state of Karnataka, India. It is located in the Narasimharajapura taluk of Chikkamagaluru district in Karnataka.

== Demographics ==
As of 2001 India census, B.Kanabur had a population of 9930 with 4985 males and 4945 females.

== See also ==
- Chikmagalur
- Districts of Karnataka
