= Nittur railway station =

Railway station in Karnataka

Nittur

General information
- Location: Nittur, Tumakuru district, Karnatak; India
- Coordinates: 13°18′06″N 76°51′21″E
- Elevation: 801 metres (2,628 ft)
- System: Indian Railways station
- Owner: Indian Railways
- Operator: South Western Railway
- Line: Bangalore–Arsikere–Hubli line
- Platforms: 2
- Tracks: Double Electric-Line

Construction
- Structure type: Standard (on ground)

Other information
- Status: Functioning
- Station code: NTR
- Zone(s): South Western Railway
- Division(s): Bangalore

Services
Preceding station	Indian Railways	Following station
Gubbi towards ?	South Western Railway zone Bangalore–Arsikere–Hubli line	Sampige Road towards ?
Location
- Interactive map

Nittur railway station is a railway station in located on Bangalore–Arsikere–Hubli railway line operated by the South Western Railway zone under Bangalore railway division. It is situated at Nittur in Tumakuru district in the Indian state of Karnatak.
