= Thandaga =

- village
- Country: India
- State: Karnataka
- District: Tumkur
- Talukas: Turuvekere

Population (2011)
  - Total: 2,359

Languages
  - Official: Kannada
- Time zone: UTC+5:30 (IST)
- Postal code: 577597

Thandaga is a village in Turuvekere taluk of Tumkur district in the Indian state of Karnataka.
