= Honnavalli Road railway station =

Railway station in Karnataka

Honnavalli Road

General information
- Location: Konehalli, Tumakuru district, Karnatak; India
- Coordinates: 13°16′28″N 76°23′24″E
- Elevation: 891 metres (2,923 ft)
- System: Indian Railways station
- Owner: Indian Railways
- Operator: South Western Railway
- Line: Bangalore–Arsikere–Hubli line
- Platforms: 3
- Tracks: Double Electric-Line

Construction
- Structure type: Standard (on ground)

Other information
- Status: Functioning
- Station code: HVL
- Zone(s): South Western Railway
- Division(s): Mysore

Services
Preceding station	Indian Railways	Following station
Sree Saradanagar Halt towards ?	South Western Railway zone Bangalore–Arsikere–Hubli line	Adihalli towards ?
Location
- Interactive map

Honnavalli Road railway station is a railway station located on the Bangalore–Arsikere–Hubli railway line operated by the South Western Railway zone under Mysore railway division. It is situated at Konehalli in Tumakuru district in the Indian state of Karnataka.
