= Rayasandra =

Village in Karnataka, India

Coordinates: 13°13′N 77°44′E

Rayasandra is a village in the Tumkur district of Karnataka, India. It is located in the Dandinashivara hobli, Turuvekere taluk of Tumkur district in Karnataka. The village belongs to Machenahalli grampanchayat, has around 80-100 houses, the speaking language is Kannada. The village has mainly two communities Lingayat and Adi Karnataka.

== Schools in Rayasandra ==
- BES Naganathapura (Naganathapura)
- GHPS Doddanagamangala (Doddanagamangala)
- Sahana Vidya Mandira (Naganathapura)
- St Gasper School (Doddanagamangala)
