= Aralaguppe railway station =

Railway station in Karnataka

Aralaguppe

General information
- Location: State Highway 74, Aralaguppe, Tumakuru district, Karnatak; India
- Coordinates: 13°15′11″N 76°36′56″E
- Elevation: 849 metres (2,785 ft)
- System: Indian Railways station
- Owner: Indian Railways
- Operator: South Western Railway
- Line: Bangalore–Arsikere–Hubli line
- Platforms: 2
- Tracks: Double Electric-Line

Construction
- Structure type: Standard (on ground)

Other information
- Status: Functioning
- Station code: ARGP
- Zone(s): South Western Railway
- Division(s): Mysore

Services
Preceding station	Indian Railways	Following station
Banasandra towards ?	South Western Railway zone Bangalore–Arsikere–Hubli line	Kardi towards ?
Location
- Interactive map

Aralaguppe railway station is a railway station in located on Bangalore–Arsikere–Hubli railway line operated by the South Western Railway zone under Mysore railway division. It is situated beside State Highway 74 at Aralaguppe in Tumakuru district in the Indian state of Karnatak.
