= Adihalli railway station =

Railway station in Karnataka

Adihalli

General information
- Location: Adihalli, Hassan district, Karnatak; India
- Coordinates: 13°17′00″N 76°20′50″E
- Elevation: 845 metres (2,772 ft)
- System: Indian Railways station
- Owner: Indian Railways
- Operator: South Western Railway
- Line: Bangalore–Arsikere–Hubli line
- Platforms: 1
- Tracks: Double Electric-Line

Construction
- Structure type: Standard (on ground)

Other information
- Status: Functioning
- Station code: ADHL
- Zone(s): South Western Railway
- Division(s): Mysore

Services
| Preceding station | Indian Railways | Following station |
|---|---|---|
| Honnavalli Road towards ? | South Western Railway zone Bangalore–Arsikere–Hubli line | Arsikere Junction towards ? |
Location
- Interactive map

Adihalli railway station is a railway station located on the Bangalore–Arsikere–Hubli railway line operated by the South Western Railway zone under Mysore railway division. It is situated at Adihalli in Hassan district in the Indian state of Karnataka.
