= Nittur =

- Village
- Location in Karnataka, India Nittur (India)
- Coordinates: 13°18′0″N 76°52′0″E
- Country: India
- State: Karnataka
- District: Tumkur
- Talukas: Gubbi

Languages
  - Official: Kannada
- Time zone: UTC+5:30 (IST)
- Nearest city: Gubbi
- Lok Sabha constituency: Tumkur
- Vidhan Sabha constituency: Gubbi

Nittur is a village in the Tumkur district of Karnataka, India.

Nittur is famous for Jwalamalini Temple, an ancient Jain centre. The Jwalamalini Temple (also known as the Shantinatha Digambar Jain temple) is said to have been built in the year 1175 A.D. It was famous as "the Ayyahole of the South". Originally, the idol of Bhagawan Adinatha was the main deity in this temple, but with the passage of time, it was ruined; the present idol of Bhagawan Shanthinatha was installed on 26 January 1969.

== Transportation ==
Nittur railway station is situated at Nittur on Bangalore–Arsikere–Hubli railway line.

== See also ==
- Hagalavadi
