= Simhanagadde Jain temple =

Shri Atishaya Kshetra Simhanagadde
- ಶ್ರೀ ಕ್ಷೇತ್ರ ಸಿಂಹನಗದ್ದೆ ಜ್ವಾಲಾ ಮಾಲಿನಿ ದಿಗಂಬರ ಜೈನ ದೇವಾಲಯ

Religion
- Affiliation: Jainism
- Deity: Jwalamalini
- Festival: Mahavir Jayanti

Location
- Location: Narasimharajapura, Chickmagalur, Karnataka
- Interactive map of Shri Atishaya Kshetra Simhanagadde
- Coordinates: 13°36′18.7″N 75°29′51.1″E

Architecture
- Style: Vijayanagara architecture
- Creator: Muni Chikk Samantbhadra
- Established: 15-16th century
- Temple: 10

Website
- www.simhanagadde.org

Shri Atishaya Kshetra Simhanagadde Jwala Malini Digambar Jain Temple or Atishaya Shri Kshetra Simhanagadde is a famous Jain temple in Narasimharajapura of Chikmagalur district in Karnataka.

== About temple ==
The temple is considered one of the main Jain centres in Karnataka. The main temple is dedicated to the goddess Jwalamalini. Jwalamalini presides as the guardian deity of the temple. Jwalamalini is seated in Sukhasana posture with her eight hands carrying dāna, double arrow, chakra, trishula, pasha, flag, bowlet and kalasa. The goddess is seated on a buffalo pedestal. The pedestal has a three-line Kannada inscription.

The temple belongs to the Vijayanagara period and forms part of the Yapaniya sect of Mula Sangha. The temple complex includes a Humcha Matha and is a site for one of the 11 surviving Bhattarak in Karnataka. The temple houses a depiction of Samavasarana in the main devi Pārśvanātha Basadi.

The temple is famous for its chaturvidha (four-fold) dāna' tradition.

== Other temples ==
Chandraprabha Basadi is built using wood and stone. The mulnayak of the temple is a 2.5 feet (0.76 m) white marble idol of Chandraprabha seated in lotus position with shrivatsa carved on the chest and symbol of moon carved on the pedestal.

Shantinath Basadi is built using laterite bricks and a tiled roof. The mulnayak of the temple is a 3 feet (0.91 m) dark stone idol of Shantinatha bearing an inscription dating back to the 14th century.

== See also ==
- Humcha Jain temples
- Padmavati
