= Banashankari Halt railway station =

Railway station in Karnataka

Banashankari Halt

General information
- Location: Kotanaikanahalli, Tiptur Taluk, Tumakuru district, Karnatak; India
- Coordinates: 13°15′56″N 76°31′23″E
- Elevation: 849 metres (2,785 ft)
- System: Indian Railways station
- Owner: Indian Railways
- Operator: South Western Railway
- Line: Bangalore–Arsikere–Hubli line
- Platforms: 2
- Tracks: Double Electric-Line

Construction
- Structure type: Standard (on ground)

Other information
- Status: Functioning
- Station code: BNK
- Zone(s): South Western Railway
- Division(s): Mysore

Services
Preceding station	Indian Railways	Following station
Kardi towards ?	South Western Railway zone Bangalore–Arsikere–Hubli line	Tiptur towards ?
Location
- Interactive map

Banashankari Halt railway station is a halt railway station located on the Bangalore–Arsikere–Hubli railway line operated by the South Western Railway zone under Mysore railway division. It is situated at Kotanaikanahalli, Tiptur Taluk in Tumakuru district in the Indian state of Karnataka.
