= Tiptur railway station =

Railway station in Karnataka

Tiptur

General information
- Location: Tiptur, Tumakuru district, Karnatak; India
- Coordinates: 13°15′22″N 76°28′34″E
- Elevation: 859 metres (2,818 ft)
- System: Indian Railways station
- Owner: Indian Railways
- Operator: South Western Railway
- Line: Bangalore–Arsikere–Hubli line
- Platforms: 4
- Tracks: Double Electric-Line

Construction
- Structure type: Standard (on ground)

Other information
- Status: Functioning
- Station code: TTR
- Zone(s): South Western Railway
- Division(s): Mysore

Services
Preceding station	Indian Railways	Following station
Banashankari Halt towards ?	South Western Railway zone Bangalore–Arsikere–Hubli line	Sree Saradanagar Halt towards ?
Location
- Interactive map

Tiptur railway station is a railway station located on the Bangalore–Arsikere–Hubli railway line operated by the South Western Railway zone under Mysore railway division. It is situated at Tiptur in Tumakuru district in the Indian state of Karnataka.
