= Sivapur railway station =

Railway station in Karnataka

Sivapur

General information
- Location: Bangalore-Honnavar Road, Sivapur, Chikmagalur district, Karnatak; India
- Coordinates: 13°38′49″N 75°56′21″E
- Elevation: 779 metres (2,556 ft)
- System: Indian Railways station
- Owner: Indian Railways
- Operator: South Western Railway
- Line: Bangalore–Arsikere–Hubli line
- Platforms: 1
- Tracks: Single Electric-Line

Construction
- Structure type: Standard (on ground)

Other information
- Status: Functioning
- Station code: SPV
- Zone(s): South Western Railway
- Division(s): Mysore

Services
Preceding station	Indian Railways	Following station
Birur Junction towards ?	South Western Railway zone Bangalore–Arsikere–Hubli line	Koranahalli towards ?
Location
- Interactive map

Sivapur railway station is a railway station located on the Bangalore–Arsikere–Hubli railway line operated by the South Western Railway zone under Mysore railway division. It is situated beside Bangalore-Honnavar Road at Sivapur in Chikmagalur district in the Indian state of Karnataka.
