= Sree Saradanagar Halt railway station =

Railway station in Karnataka

Sree Saradanagar Halt

General information
- Location: Vidya Nagar, Tiptur, Tumakuru district, Karnatak; India
- Coordinates: 13°15′39″N 76°27′17″E
- Elevation: 876 metres (2,874 ft)
- System: Indian Railways station
- Owner: Indian Railways
- Operator: South Western Railway
- Line: Bangalore–Arsikere–Hubli line
- Platforms: 1
- Tracks: Double Electric-Line

Construction
- Structure type: Standard (on ground)

Other information
- Status: Functioning
- Station code: SSNH
- Zone(s): South Western Railway
- Division(s): Mysore

Services
Preceding station	Indian Railways	Following station
Tiptur towards ?	South Western Railway zone Bangalore–Arsikere–Hubli line	Honnavalli Road towards ?
Location
- Interactive map

Sree Saradanagar Halt railway station is a railway halt station located on the Bangalore–Arsikere–Hubli railway line operated by the South Western Railway zone under Mysore railway division. It is situated at Vidya Nagar, Tiptur in Tumakuru district in the Indian state of Karnataka.
