= Aduvalli (Narasimharajapura) =

Aduvalli Narasimharajapura
- village
- Interactive map of Aduvalli
- Coordinates: 13.4443°N 75.4819°E
- Country: India
- State: Karnataka
- District: Chikkamagaluru
- Talukas: Narasimharajapura

Government
  - Body: Village Panchayat

Languages
  - Official: Kannada
- Time zone: UTC+5:30 (IST)
- Nearest city: Chikmagalur
- Civic agency: Village Panchayat

Aduvalli (Narasimharajapura) is a village in the southern state of Karnataka, India. It is located in the Narasimharajapura taluk of Chikkamagaluru district in Karnataka.

== See also ==
- Chikmagalur
- Districts of Karnataka
