= Ponnur Malai Jain temple =

Jain temple in the state of Tamil Nadu

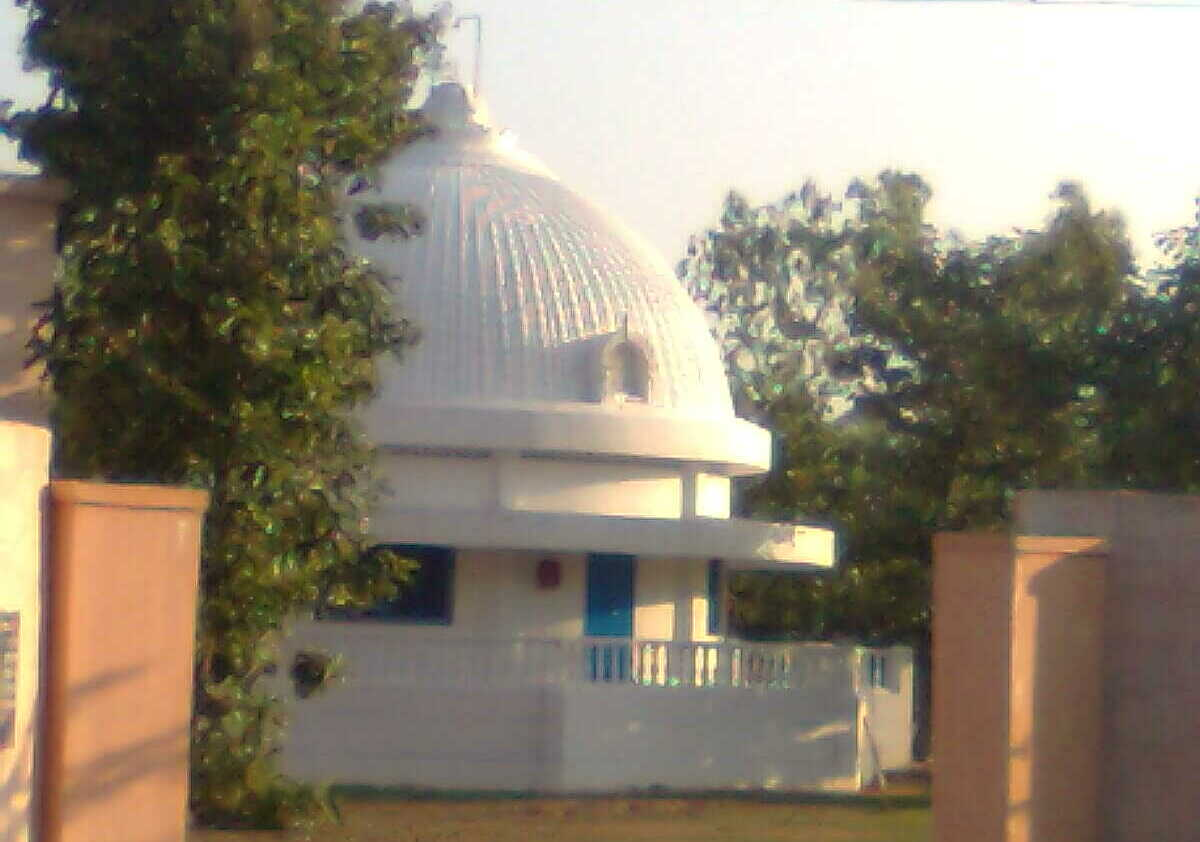
- Ponnur Malai Jain temple

- Location within Tamil Nadu

Religion
- Affiliation: Jainism
- Sect: Digambara
- Deity: Rishabhanatha
- Festival: Mahavir Jayanti

Location
- Location: Ponnur Hills, Tiruvannamalai, Tamil Nadu
- Coordinates: 12°30′05.8″N 79°31′26.9″E

Ponnur Malai Jain temple is an ancient Jain pilgrimage center located in Ponnur Hills in Tiruvannamalai district of Tamil Nadu in India.

== History ==
Ponnur Hill marks the place of birth for Jain Acharya Kundakunda. According to Jain beliefs, he visited Videha Kshetra and ascended to Heaven from here.

== Temple ==
The temple enshrines an idol of Rishabhanatha inside the mukhya-mandapa. An idol of Jwalamalini was installed inside the temple in 1733 CE. The temple is noted for the worship of the tutelary deity Jwalamalini, who is popular among devotees. On Sundays, there is a tradition of carrying the image of Jwalamalini to the shrine of Helacharya, the originator of Jwalamalini tantric practices, in Nilgiri Mountains.

The temple houses the footprints, which are annually anointed.

== Gallery ==
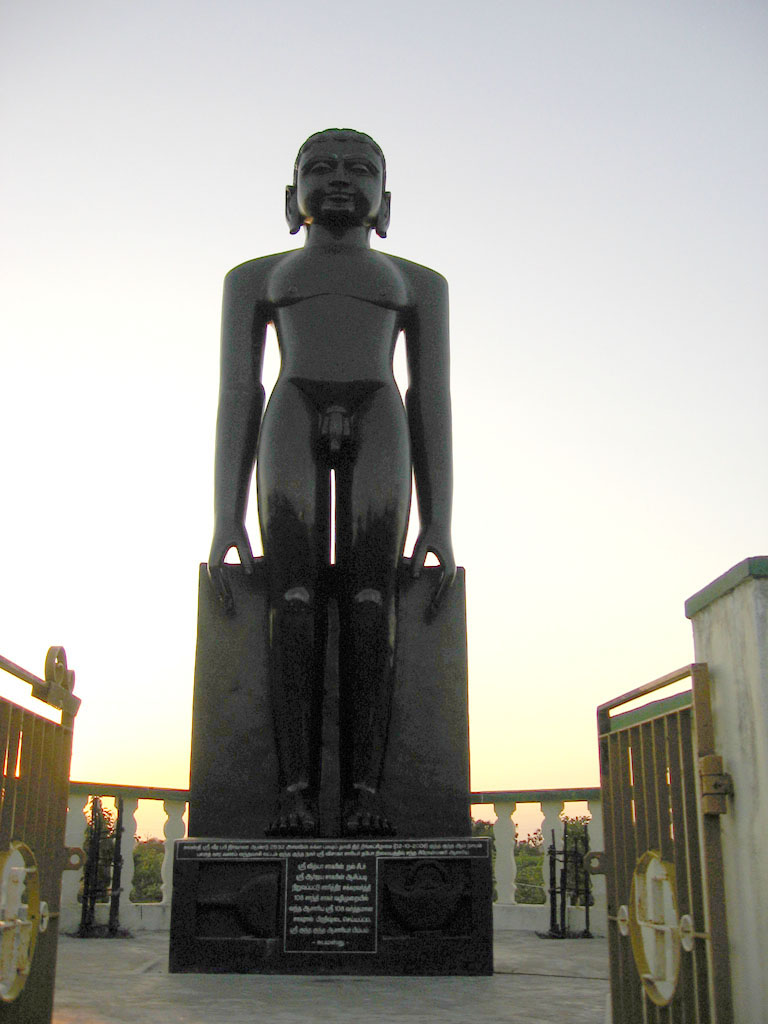
Idol of Kundakunda

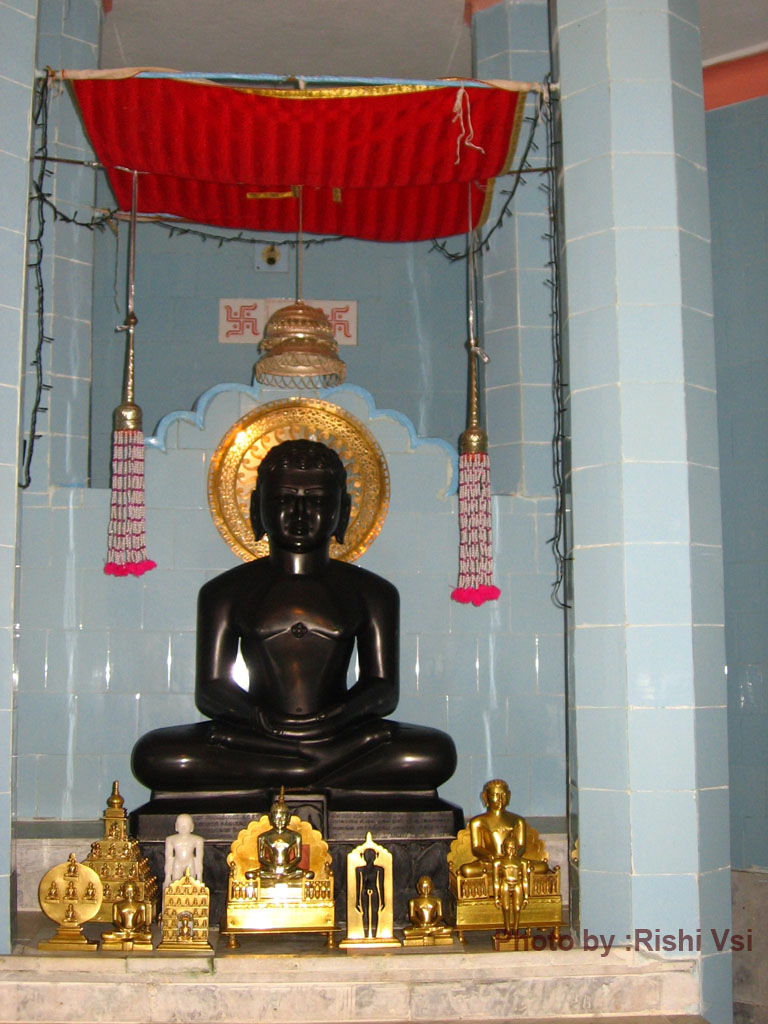
Rishabhanatha

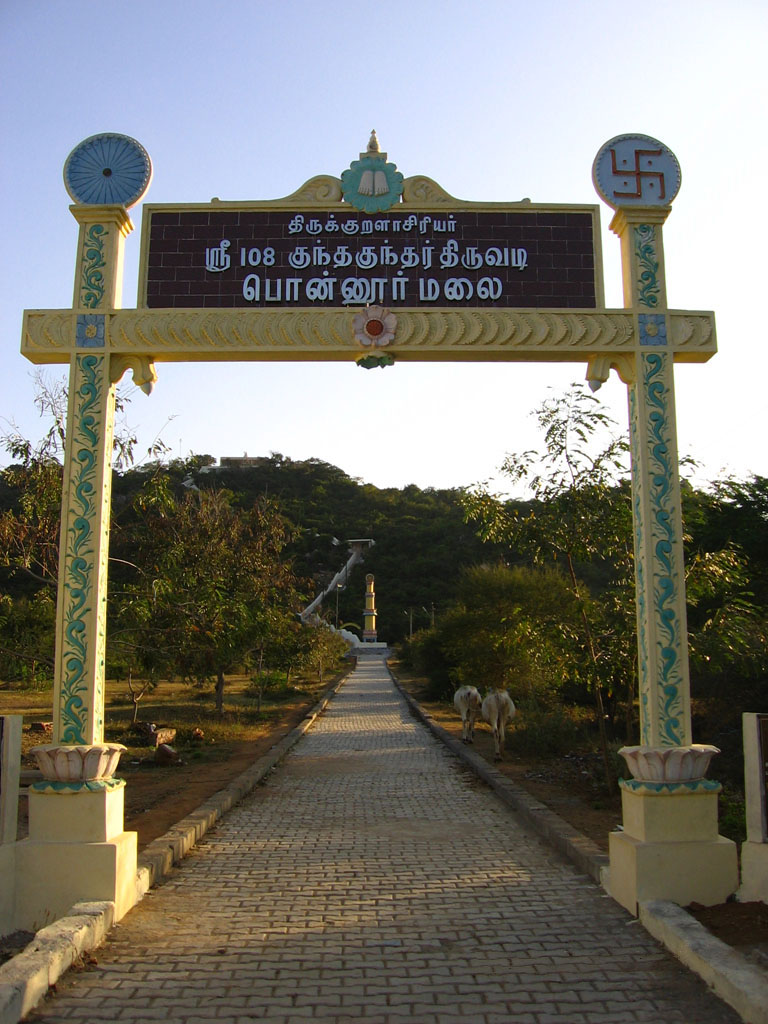
Entrance
