= Somanathapura (disambiguation) =

Somanathapura is a temple town popular for Chennakeshava Temple in Mysore, Karnataka, India. It may also refer to the following places:

== Karnataka ==
- Somanathapura, Mysuru, a village in Tirumakudal - Narsipur Taluk, Mysore district
  - Chennakeshava Temple, Somanathapura
- Somanathapura, Mandya, a village in Krishnarajpet Taluk, Mandya district
- Somanathapura, Chikkaballapur, a village in Bagepalli Taluk, Chikkaballapura district
- Somanathapura, Channapatna, a village in Channapatna Taluk, Ramanagara district
- Somanathapura, Kanakapura, a village in Kanakapura Taluk, Ramanagara district
- Somnathahalli, Gulbarga, a village in Gulbarga Taluk, Gulbarga district
- Somnathahalli, Jewargi, a village in Jewargi Taluk, Gulbarga district
- Somnathanahalli, Hassan, a village in Channarayapatna Taluk, Hassan district

== Tamil Nadu ==
- Somanathapuram, a town in Kallakkurichi Taluk, Viluppuram district

== Orissa ==
- Somanathapur, Begunia, a village in Begunia Taluk, Khordha district
- Somanathapur, Khordha, a village in Khordha Sadar Taluk, Khordha district
- Somanathapur, Puri, a village in Kakatpur Taluk, Puri district
- Somanathapur, Ganjam, a village in Jarada Taluk, Ganjam district

== See also ==
- Somanath (disambiguation)
- Chennakeshava Temple (disambiguation)
