= Adihalli (Arsikere) =

- village
- Location in Karnataka, India Adihalli (India)
- Coordinates: 13°17′40″N 76°20′20″E
- Country: India
- State: Karnataka
- District: Hassan
- Talukas: Arsikere

Government
  - Body: Village Panchayat

Languages
  - Official: Kannada
- Time zone: UTC+5:30 (IST)
- Nearest city: Hassan, India
- Civic agency: Village Panchayat

Adihalli is a village in the southern state of Karnataka, India. It is located in the Arsikere taluk of Hassan district in Karnataka.

== Transportation ==
The nearest railway connection is Adihalli railway station located on Bangalore–Arsikere–Hubli railway line.

== See also ==
- Hassan
- Districts of Karnataka
