= Jwalamalini =

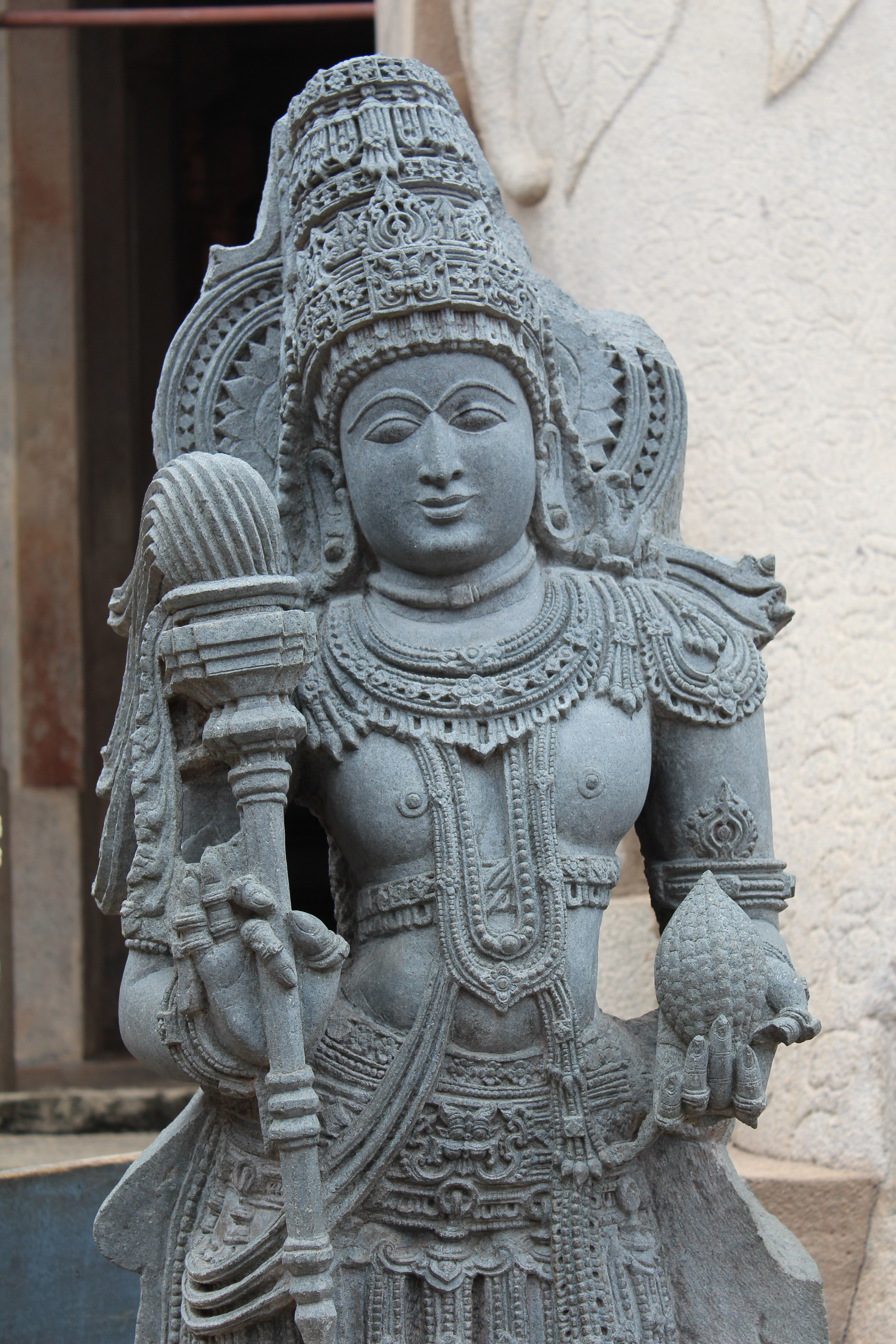
- Jwalamalini, c. 17th-19th cent, Ackland Art Museum
- Affiliation: Devi

Genealogy
- Spouse: Vijaya or Shyama

Jwalamalini (Sanskrit: ज्वालामालिनी,Kannada: ಜ್ವಾಲಾಮಾಲಿನೀ, Jvālāmālinī) is the yakshini (guardian goddess) of the eighth tirthankara Chandraprabhu in Jainism and was one of the most widely invoked yakshinis in Karnataka during the early medieval period.

== Etymology and origin ==
Jvālā refers to the glow of fire, mālinī implies one of bears the garlands (of).

A well known historical text Jwalamalini Kalpa was composed by Jain Acharya Indranandi in 939 AD in Manyakheta during the rule of Rashtrakuta Krishnaraj. It is said to be inspired by an older text by the monk Helacharya, who had vanquished a Brahma Rakshasa by invoking Jwalamalini.

Jain literature describe Jwalamalini as Vahni Devī or the fire goddess. Her iconic forms depict her with flames issuing forth from her head. She is also described as adorned with rising flames of fire.

Jwalamalini also appears in various Hindu Puranas, the Vayu Purana associates her with the god Shiva; the Brahmanda Purana and the Matsya Purana associate her with Shakti.

== Worship ==
As per the Jvālini Kalpa, a cult in the honour of Jwalamalini was started by Helacharya, a Jain Tantric teacher of the Dravida gana monastic order. The goddess is said to have Helacharya to systematize the occult rites sacred to her. Inscriptions also record that exorcising rites were performed in her honour.

A prominent temple of the goddess is Jwalamalini temple, Narsimharajapur in Chikmagalur district in Indian state of Karnataka

The place where Helacharya propounded his system is described as Malaya Hemagrama in the south identifiable with Maleyur in the Chamrajnagar Taluk of the Mysore district in Karnataka. As described in an inscription dated 909 CE this place is holy to the Jain disciples. The inscription also registers a grant in the favor of a Jain temple.

Nittur, Thumkur district also hosts an ancient Jwalamalini temple.

Ponnur Malai Jain temple in the state of Tamil Nadu is also associated with the worship of Jwalamalini.
