= Chennakeshava Temple, Hullekere =

Chennakeshava Temple
- Hindu temple
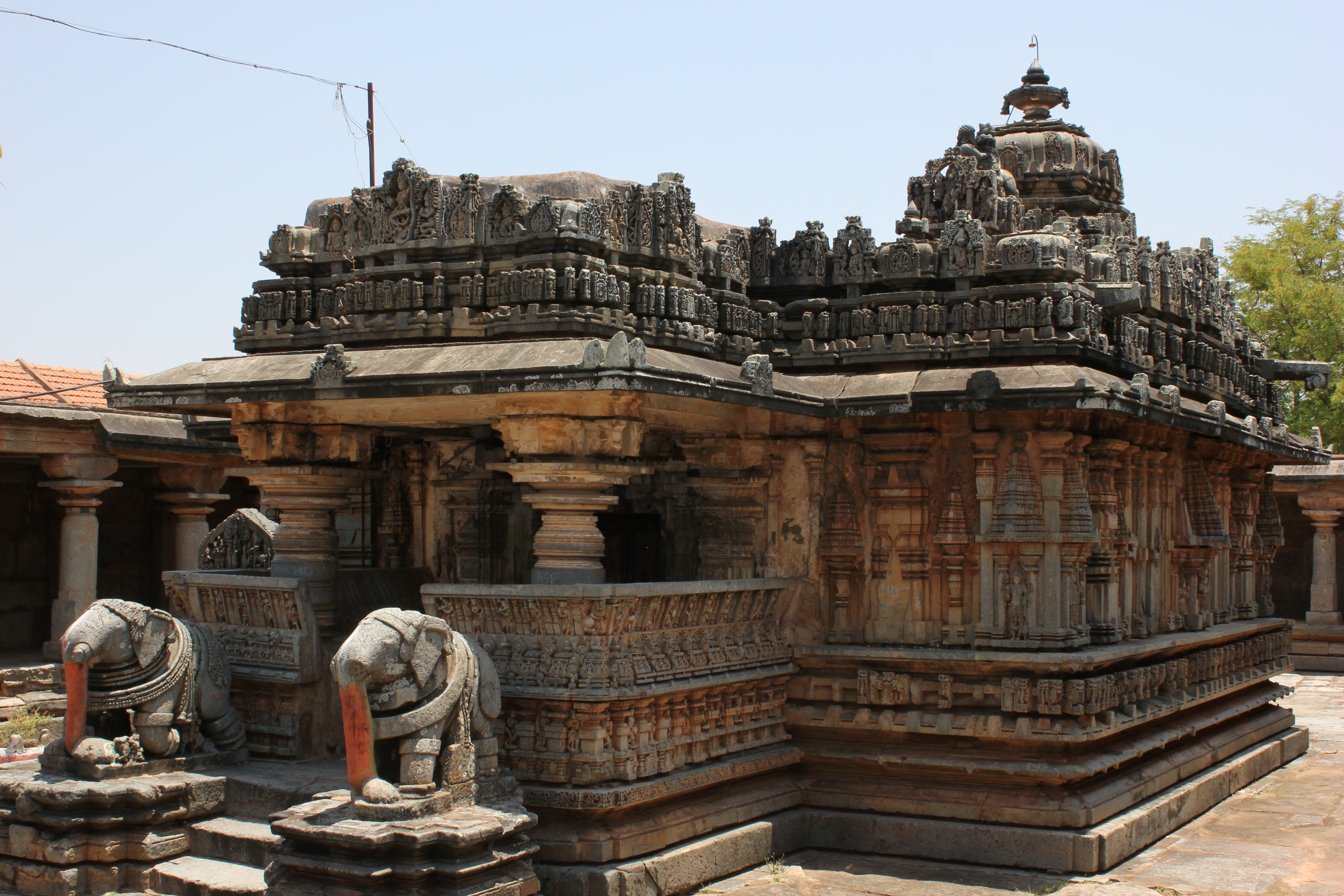
- Chennakeshava temple (1163 A.D.) at Hullekere in Hassan district
- Interactive map of Chennakeshava Temple
- Country: India
- State: Karnataka
- District: Hassan District

Languages
  - Official: Kannada
- Time zone: UTC+5:30 (IST)

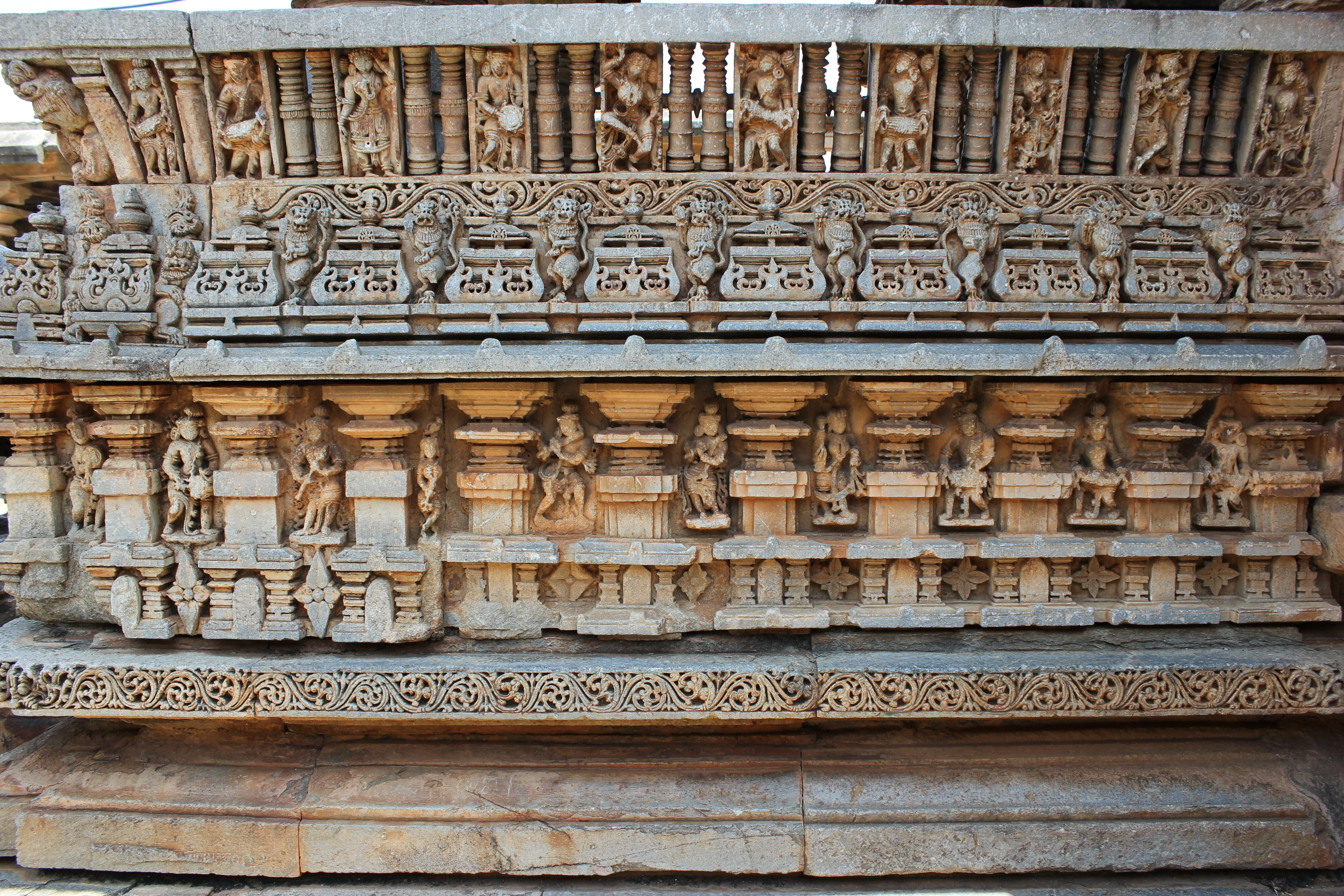
Close up of parapet wall relief in Chennakeshava temple at Hullekere

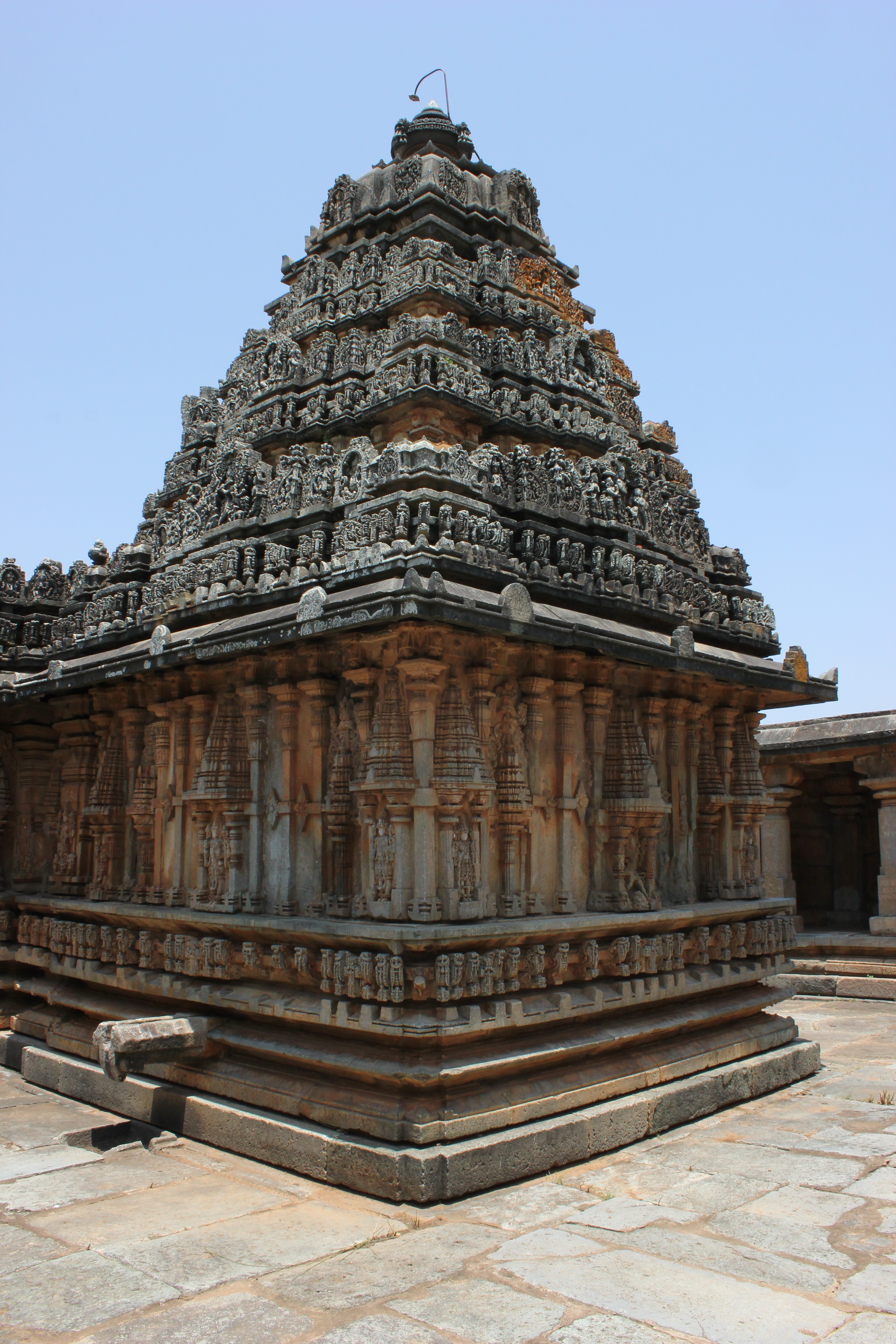
Shrine and Shikhara (tower) in Chennakeshava temple at Hullekere

The Chennakeshava temple, dedicated to the Hindu god Vishnu is located in the village of Hullekere, in the Arasikere Taluk, about 22 km from the commercial town Arasikere. It was built in 1163 A.D. by a minister of Hoysala empire king Narasimha I. The art historian Adam Hardy categorizes the architectural style as a single shrine (vimana) construction with miniature vimanas, the basic building material being Soap stone. The monument is protected by the Karnataka state division of Archaeological Survey of India.

== Temple plan ==
The temple has all the basic features of a Hoysala era construction. According to art historian Gerard Foekema, being a single vimana (cella or shrine) construction it qualifies as a ekakuta plan (a tower called shikhara over the shrine). The entrance to the temple is through an open pillared hall or porch (mukhamantapa) followed by a closed hall (mantapa or navaranga). The porch consists of an awning supported by half pillars and parapets on either side. The decor on the parapet walls, ceiling, lintel over the entrance and the pillars is noteworthy. The inner walls of the shrine is square and plain where as the outer walls (also square) have numerous recesses and projections that is used for decorative relief which includes Kirtimukha, Aedicula (miniature decorative towers), deities in relief and half pilasters. The closed hall connects to the sanctum via a vestibule (called sukhanasi). The vestibule also as a tower that looks like a low protrusion of the tower over the shrine. The ceiling of the compact closed hall is supported by four lathe turned pillars that divide the ceiling into nine tastefully decorated bays.

At the top of the main tower is the kalasha, a decorative water-pot like structure which stands on a large ornate dome. This dome is the largest piece of sculpture in the temple and can be 2m x 2m in size. On the tower over the vestibule (also called sukhanasi, Foekema calls it the "nose") is located the Hoysala emblem of a royal warrior (legend has it that it is Sala, the founder of the empire) stabbing a lion. The design of the tower, according to art historian Percy Brown, is a characteristic feature to the Hoysala art. According to Brown, the decorative details in the wall of the shrine is carried through the tower. The tower is divided into decorative tiers with each tier diminishing in height and culminating in an "umbrella" like structure. Brown also claims the lathe turned pillars with four brackets above are a signature style of the 11th-13th century Chalukya-Hoysala architectural idiom.

== Gallery ==
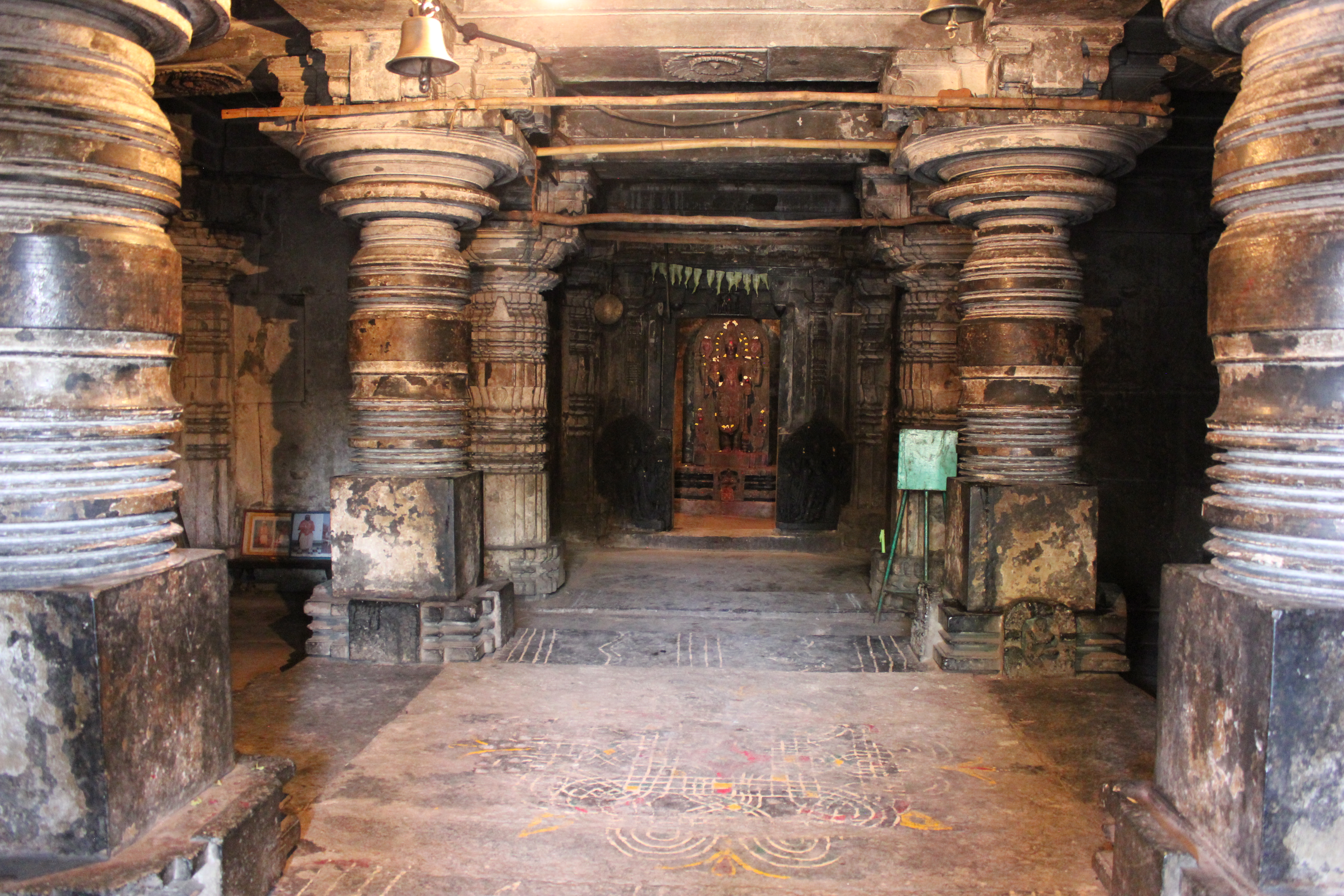
Closed mantapa with lathe turned pillars supporting bay ceiling in Chennakeshava temple at Hullekere

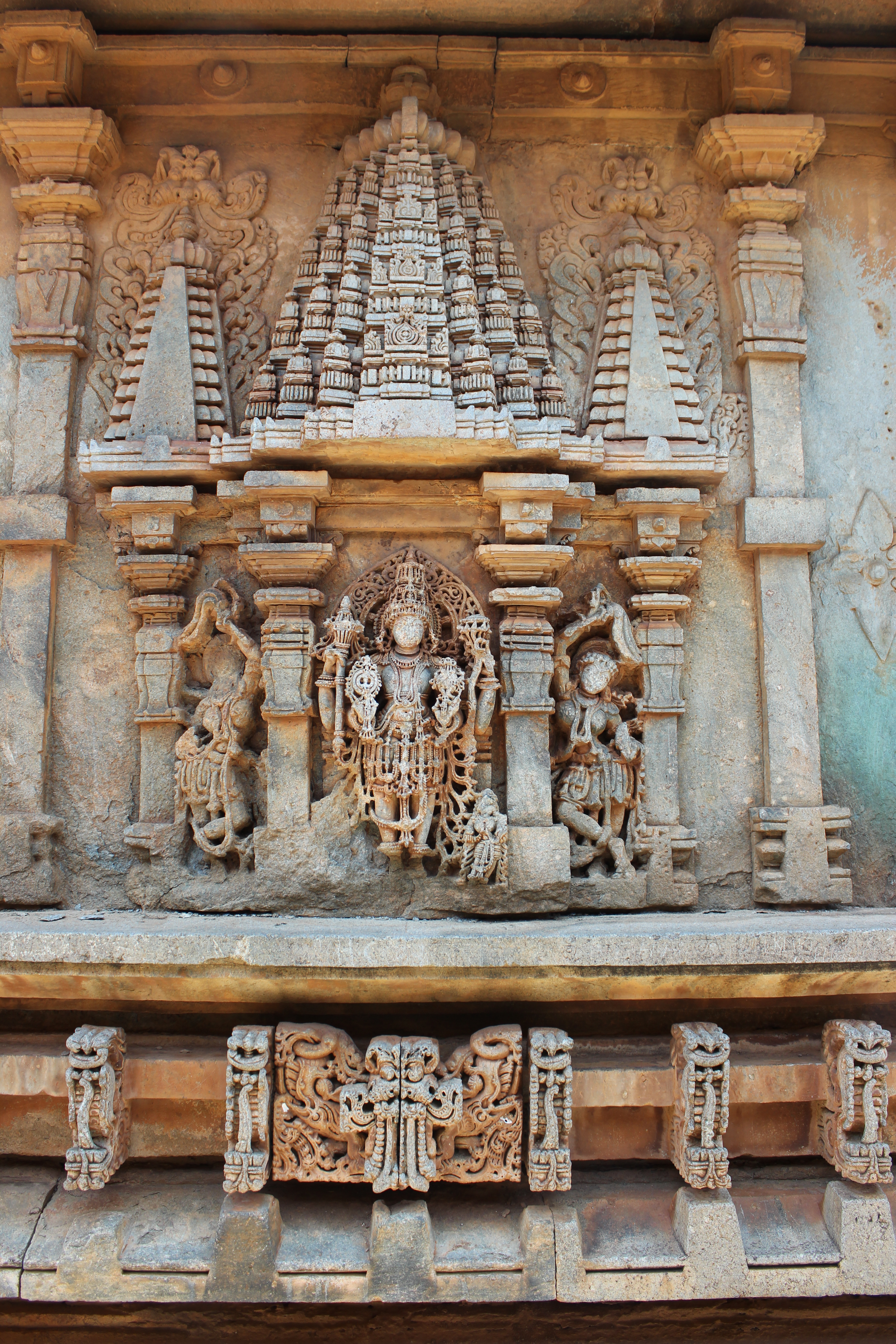
Decorative miniature decorative towers over deity relief sculpture on outer wall of Chennakeshava temple at Hullekere

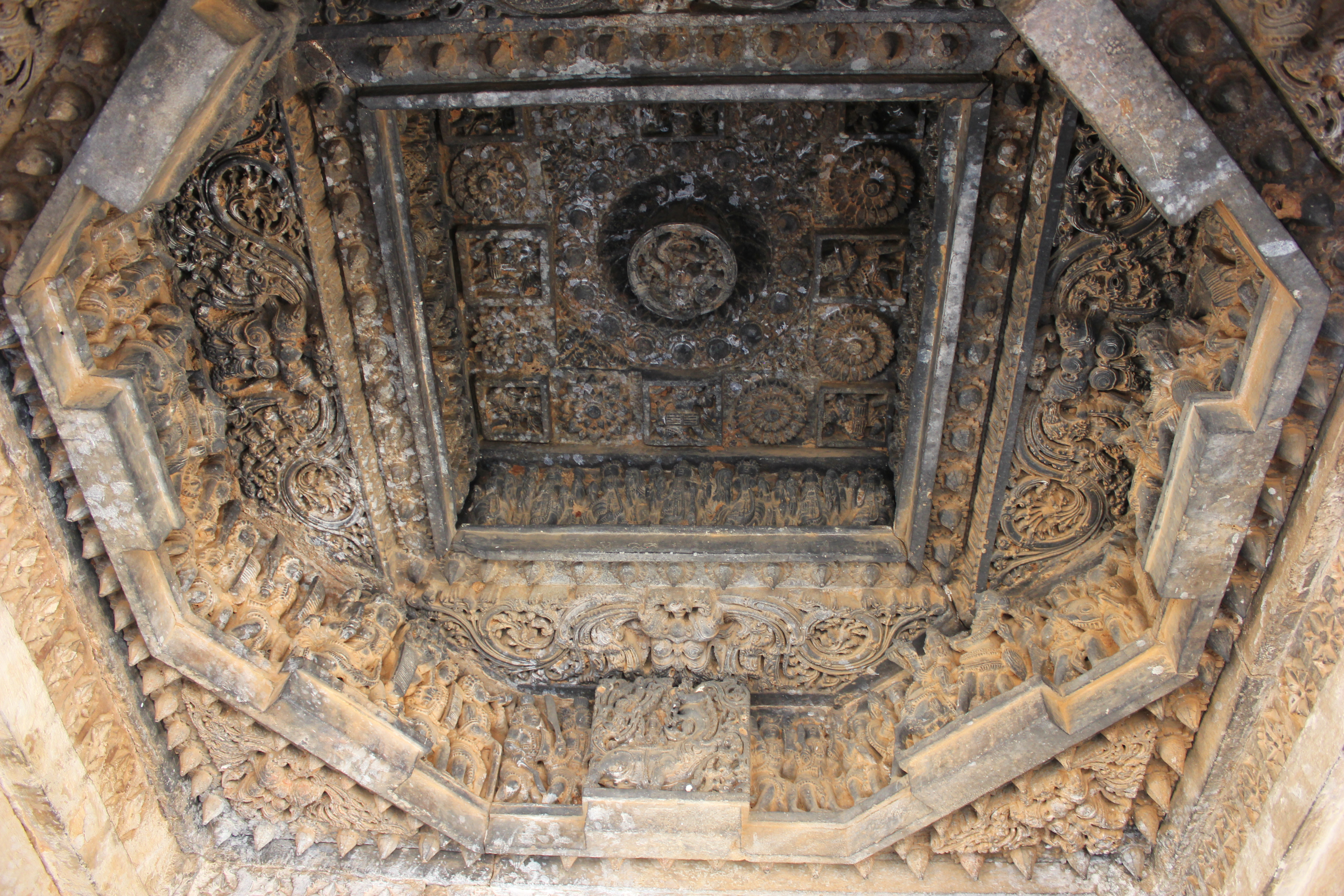
Domical ceiling over mukhamantapa (entrance porch) in Chennakeshava temple at Hullekere

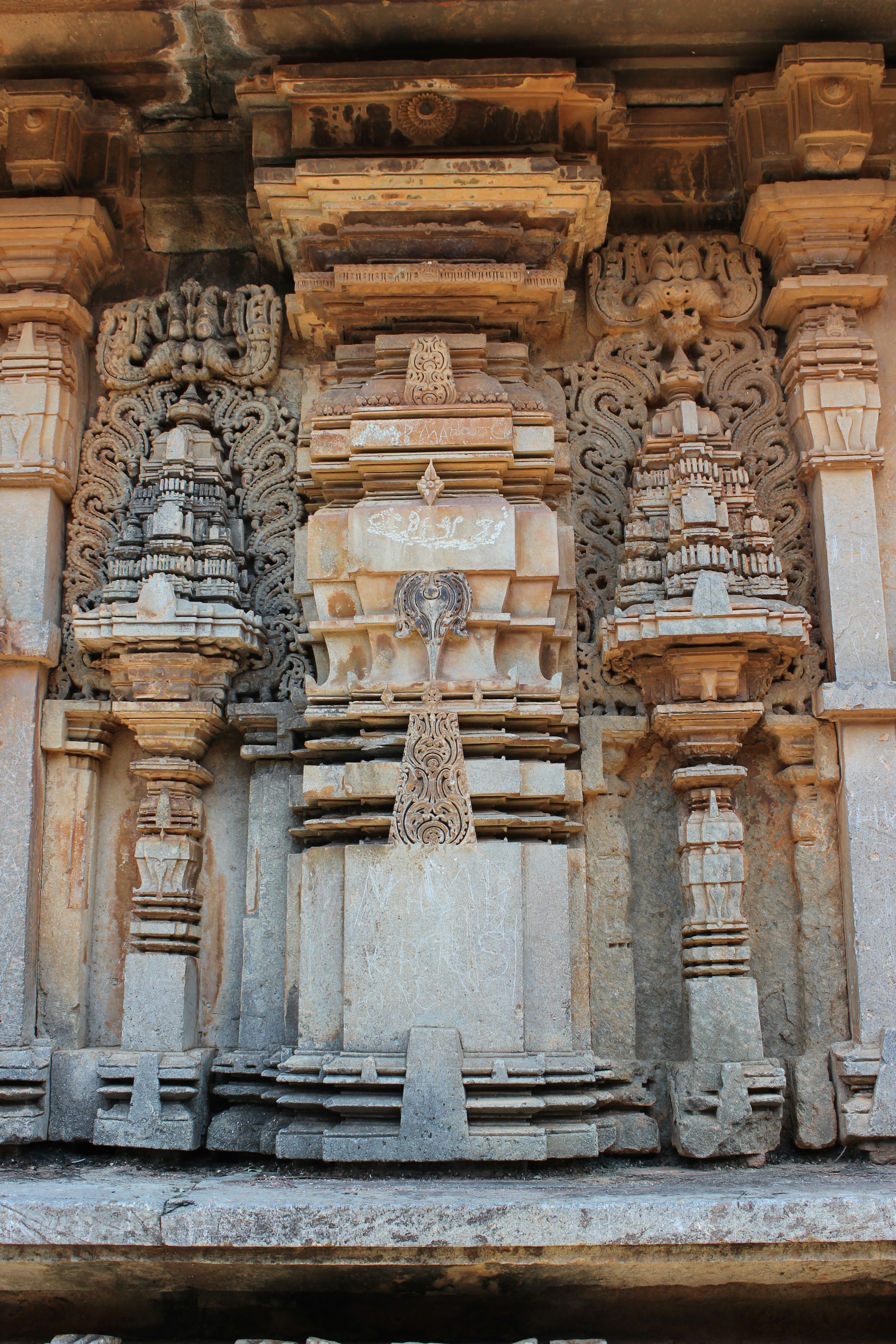
Kirtimukha over aedicules in Chennakeshava temple at Hullekere

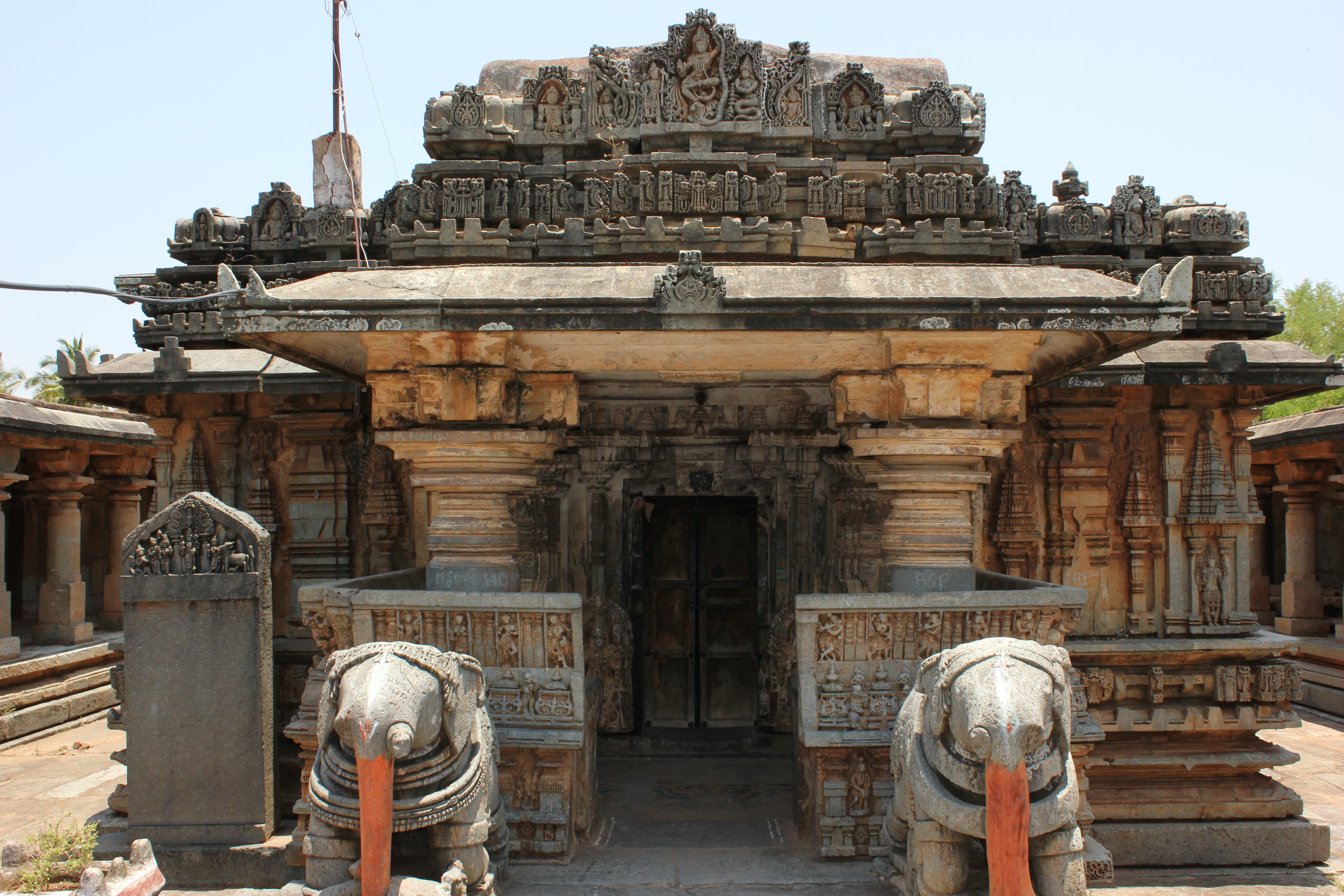
Mukhamantapa with elephant baluster in Chennakeshava temple at Hullekere

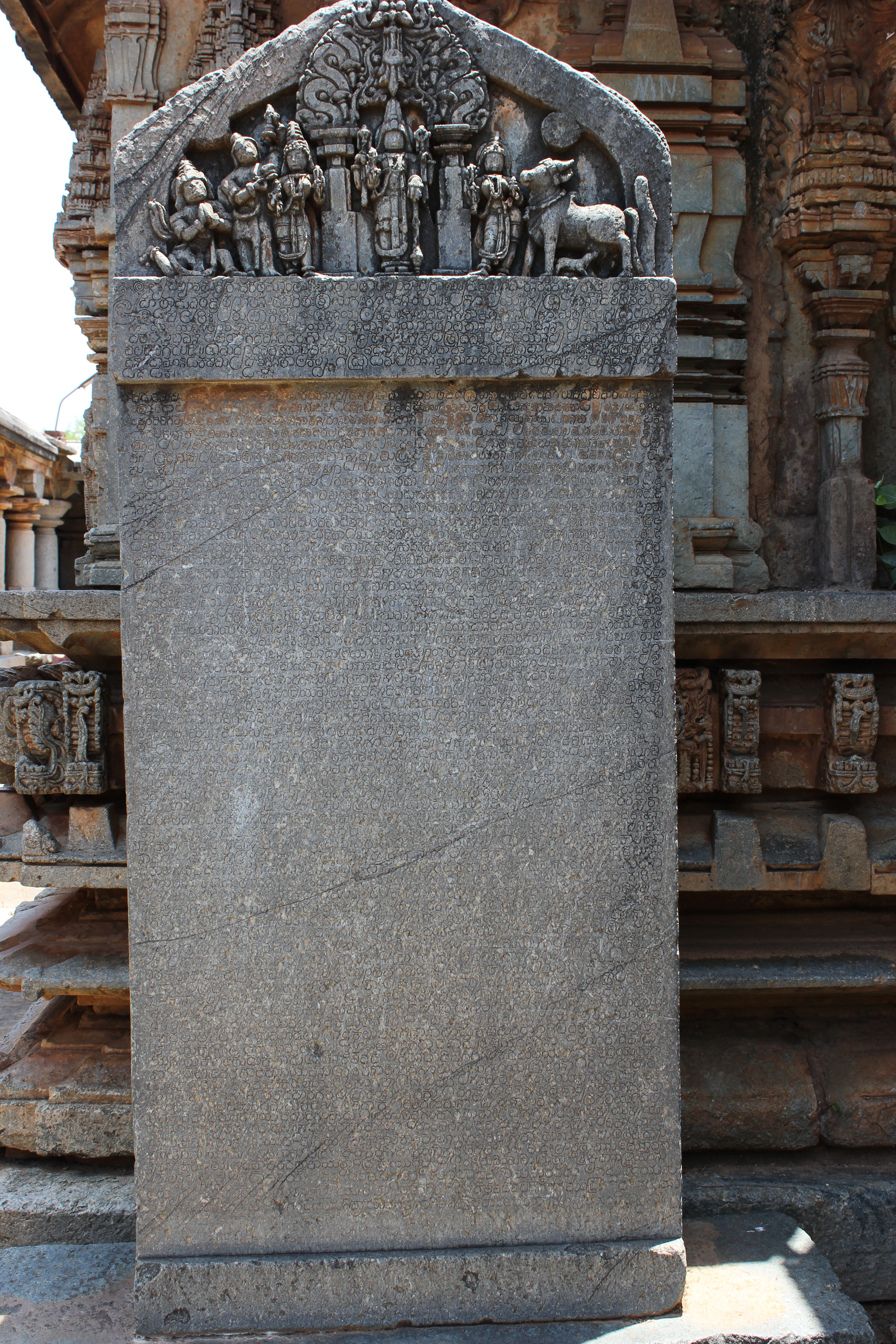
Old Kannada inscription in Chennakeshava temple at Hullekere

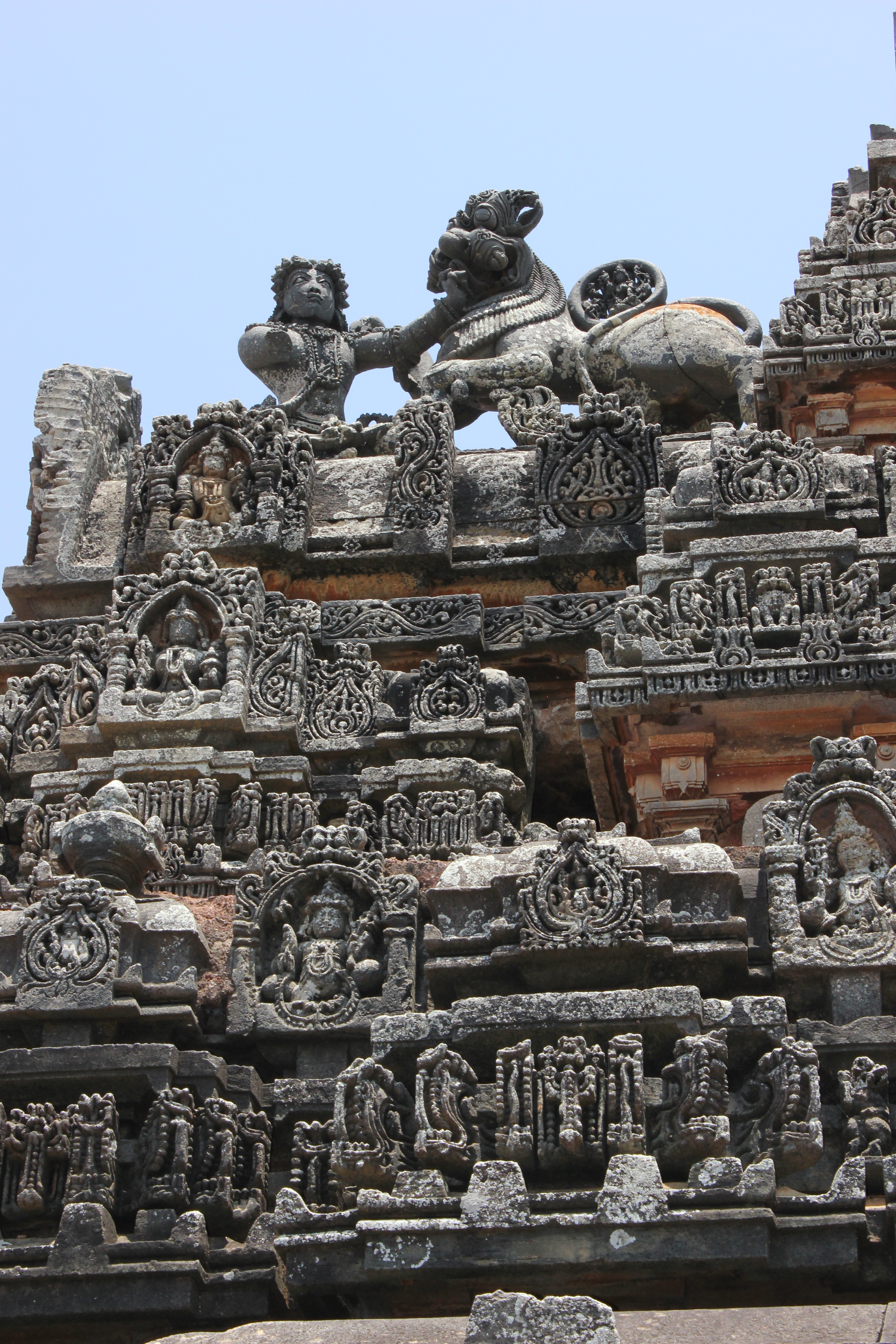
Sukhanasi (tower over vestibule) with the Hoysala emblem mounted on top in Chennakeshava temple at Hullekere

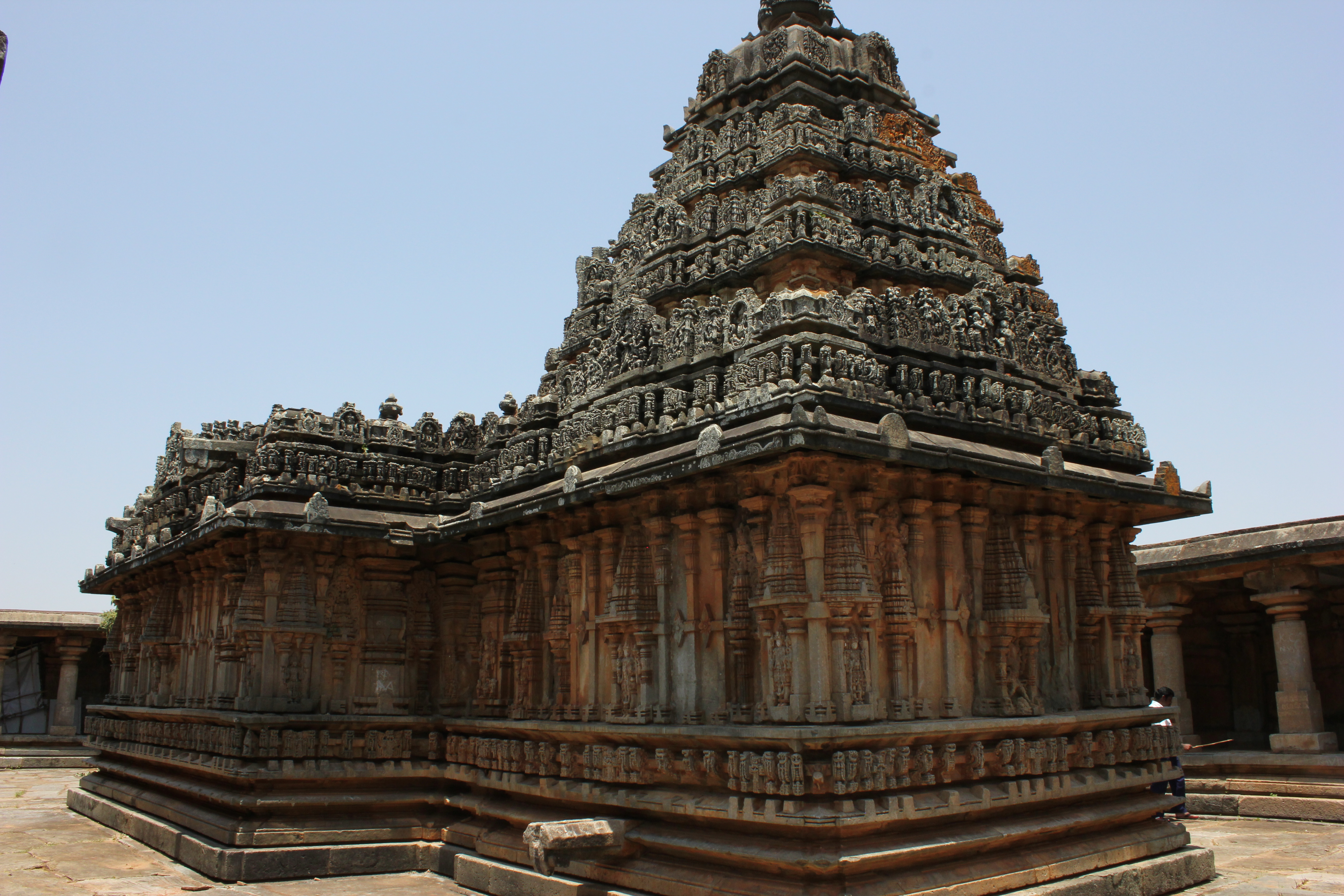
Rear view of Chennakeshava temple at Hullekere

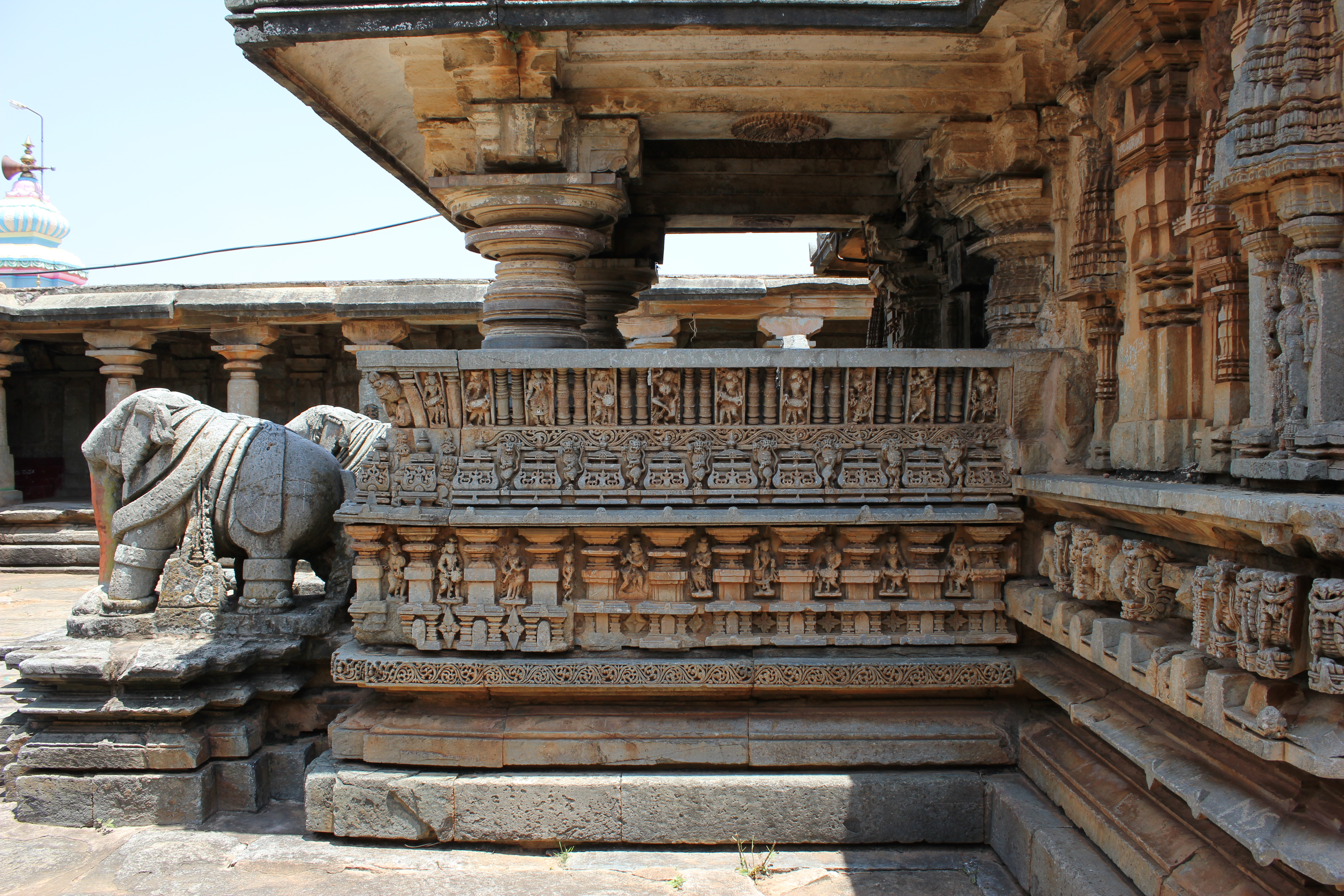
Relief on parapet wall of mukhamantapa in Chennakeshava temple at Hullekere

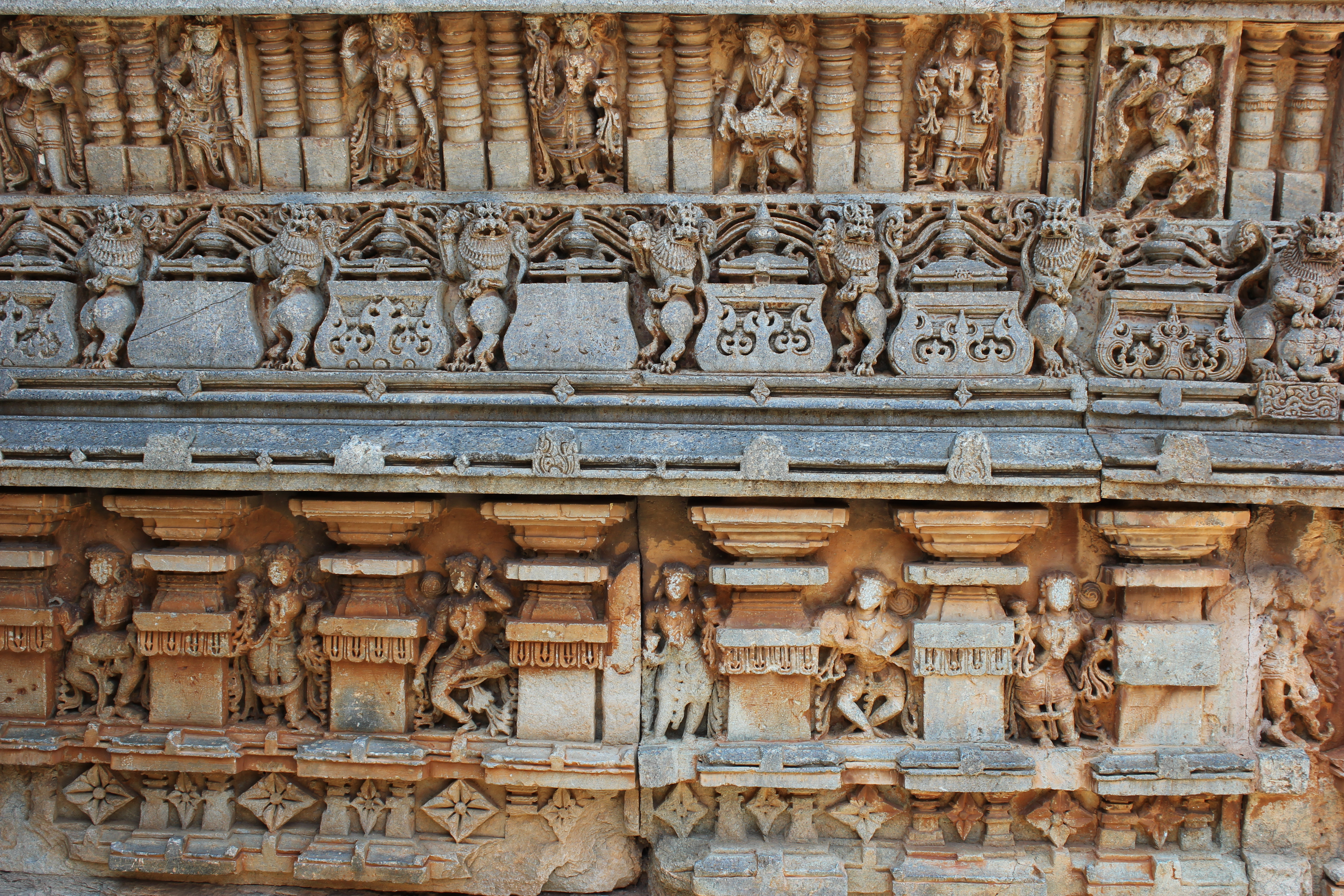
Close up of decorative relief on parapet wall in Chennakeshava temple at Hullekere
