= Aduvalli (Hassan) =

- Village
- Country: India
- State: Karnataka
- District: Hassan
- Talukas: Hassan, India

Government
  - Body: municipality

Languages
  - Official: Kannada
- Time zone: UTC+5:30 (IST)
- Nearest city: Hassan, India
- Civic agency: Village Panchayat

Aduvalli is a village in the southern state of Karnataka, India. It is located in the Hassan taluk of Hassan district in Karnataka.

== See also ==
- Hassan
- Districts of Karnataka
