= Somanath, Dahanu =

Village in Maharashtra

Somanath
- Village
- Location in Maharashtra, India Somanath (India)
- Coordinates: 19.9671897°N 72.8663173°E
- Country: India
- State: Maharashtra
- District: Palghar
- Taluka: Dahanu
- Named for: Somnath temple
- Elevation: 54 m (177 ft)

Population (2011)
  - Total: 1,940
- Time zone: UTC+5:30 (IST)
- PIN: 551672

Somanath is a village in the Palghar district of Maharashtra, India. It is located in the Dahanu taluka.

== Demographics ==
According to the 2011 census of India, Somanath has 336 households. The effective literacy rate (i.e. the literacy rate of population excluding children aged 6 and below) is 39.86%.

Demographics (2011 Census)
	Total	Male	Female
Population	1940	989	951
Children aged below 6 years	470	253	217
Scheduled caste	0	0	0
Scheduled tribe	1938	989	949
Literates	586	382	204
Workers (all)	939	474	465
Main workers (total)	897	458	439
Main workers: Cultivators	152	90	62
Main workers: Agricultural labourers	643	277	366
Main workers: Household industry workers	3	0	3
Main workers: Other	99	91	8
Marginal workers (total)	42	16	26
Marginal workers: Cultivators	3	1	2
Marginal workers: Agricultural labourers	39	15	24
Marginal workers: Household industry workers	0	0	0
Marginal workers: Others	0	0	0
Non-workers	1001	515	486
