= Mekapotula Somanath =

- Born: 1937; Chilakaluripet, Andhra Pradesh, India
- Died: 1992 (aged 54–55); Chennai, India
- Occupation: Art director
- Years active: 1960s to 1990s
- Spouse: Naga Ratnamma

Mekapotula Somanath (1937–1992) was a famous Indian Art director, who worked for Telugu (Tollywood) and Tamil (Kollywood) film industries. He worked for most of the films made by Tamil actor, Bhagyaraj and Telugu actor Chalam. He also worked for movies made by Telugu directors Mutyala Subbaiah and Relangi Narasimha Rao.

He worked as an Art Director for a Bollywood movie Aakhree Raasta, directed by Bhagyaraj.

Some of his works include-

Year	Title	Language	Role	Notes
1963	Nartanasala (నర్తనశాల)	Telugu (తెలుగు)	Asst. Art Director	--
1970	Sambarala Rambabu (సంబరాల రాంబాబు)	Telugu (తెలుగు)	Art Director	--
1972	Bullemma Bullodu (బుల్లెమ్మ బుల్లోడు)	Telugu (తెలుగు)	Art Director	--
1974	Tulabharam (తులాభారం)	Telugu (తెలుగు)	Art Director	--
1977	Daana Veera Soora Karna (దాన వీర శూర కర్ణ)	Telugu (తెలుగు)	Associate Art Director	--
1977	16 Vayathinile	Tamil	Art Director	--
1977	Kizhake Pogum Rail	Tamil	Art Director	--
1978	Du Du Basavanna (డూ డూ బసవన్న)	Telugu (తెలుగు)	Art Director	--
1978	Sigappu Rojakkal	Tamil	Art Director	--
1979	Pudiya Vaarapugal	Tamil	Art Director	--
1979	Suvar Illada Chithirangal	Tamil	Art Director	--
1980	Sannai Appanna (సన్నాయి అప్పన్న)	Telugu (తెలుగు)	Art Director	--
1980	Oru Kai Osai	Tamil	Art Director	--
1981	Gharana Gangulu (ఘరాణా గంగులు)	Telugu (తెలుగు)	Art Director	--
1981	Indru Poi Naalai Vaa	Tamil	Art Director	--
1981	Andha 7 Naatkal	Tamil	Art Director	--
1982	Thooral Ninnu Pochchu	Tamil	Art Director	--
1983	Mundhanai Mudichu	Tamil	Art Director	--
1985	Chinna Veedu	Tamil	Art Director	--
1986	Aakhree Raasta	Hindi	Art Director	--
1987	Ida Prapamcham (ఇదా ప్రపంచం)	Telugu (తెలుగు)	Art Director	--
1989	Mamatala Kovela (మమతల కోవెల)	Telugu (తెలుగు)	Art Director	--
1990	Kartavyam (కర్తవ్యం)	Telugu (తెలుగు)	Art Director	--
1991	Mama Garu (మామ గారు)	Telugu (తెలుగు)	Art Director	--
?	Kalikalam (కలికాలం)	Telugu (తెలుగు)	Art Director	--
?	Dharma Yuddham (ధర్మయుద్దం)	Telugu (తెలుగు)	Art Director	--
?	Nava Yugam (నవ యుగం)	Telugu (తెలుగు)	Art Director	--
?	Kodalu Diddina Kapuram	Telugu (తెలుగు)	Art Director	--
?	Parvatlu Panakalu	Telugu (తెలుగు)	Art Director	--
?	Cinema Pichodu	Telugu (తెలుగు)	Art Director	--
?	Lorry Driver	Telugu (తెలుగు)	Art Director	--
