= Kannur Municipality =

Kannur Municipality was the former administrative body of Kannur town, state of Kerala, India. Kannur Town and Kannur City fell under Kannur Municipality. It is one of the oldest municipalities in India. Kannur is the capital city of Kannur district. Which is one among the most important cities in Kerala. The Kanambuzha River flows in Kannur (previously called Kanathur). As of 2015, the Municipality was superseded by Kannur Corporation.
