= Chennakeshava Temple, Turuvekere =

Chennakeshava or Chennigaraya Temple
- Hindu temple
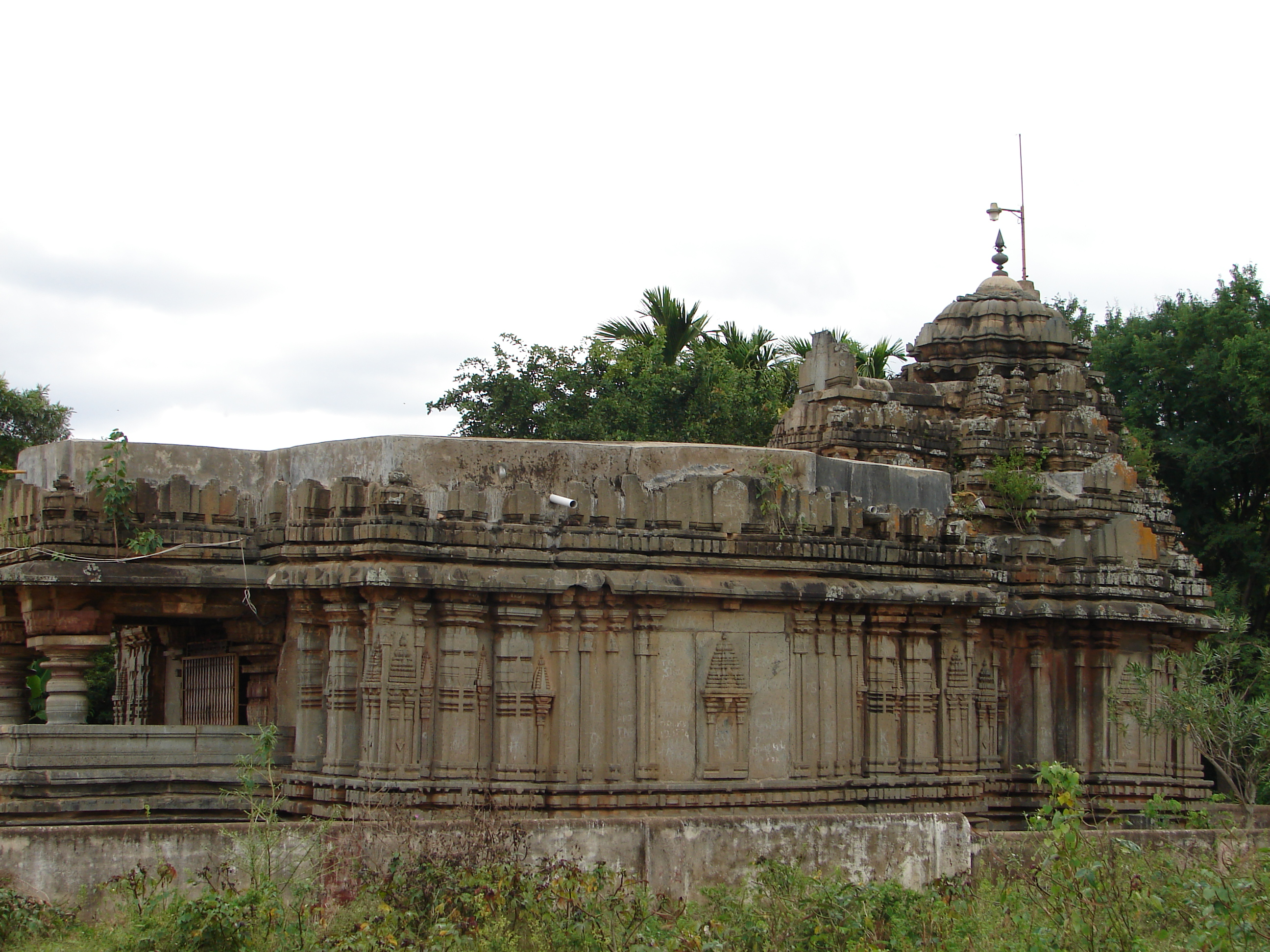
- Chennakeshava temple (1263 A.D.) at Turuvekere in Tumkur district
- Country: India
- State: Karnataka
- District: Tumkur District

Languages
  - Official: Kannada
- Time zone: UTC+5:30 (IST)

The Chennakeshava temple (also spelt "Chennakesava" or called "Chennigaraya"), dedicated to the Hindu god Vishnu is located in Turuvekere, a small town in the Tumkur district, Karnataka state, India. Turuvekere, founded as an Agraharam town (a place of learning) in the 13th century is located about 77 miles from the state capital Bangalore. The temple was built around 1263 A.D. during the rule of the Hoysala Empire King Narasimha III. This temple is a protected monument under the Karnataka state division of the Archaeological Survey of India.

== Temple plan ==
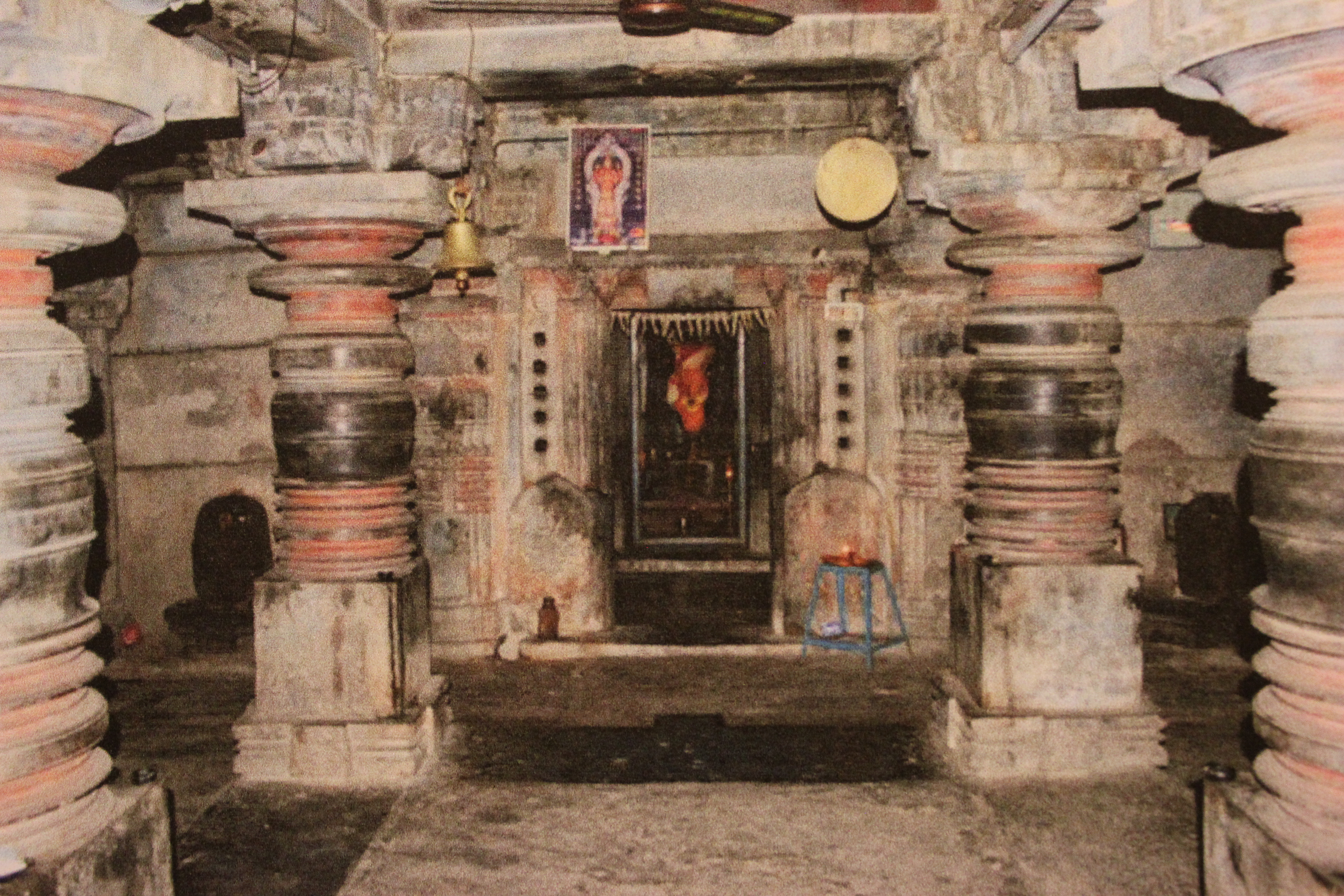
Mantapa with lathe turned pillars at Chennakeshava temple in Turuvekere

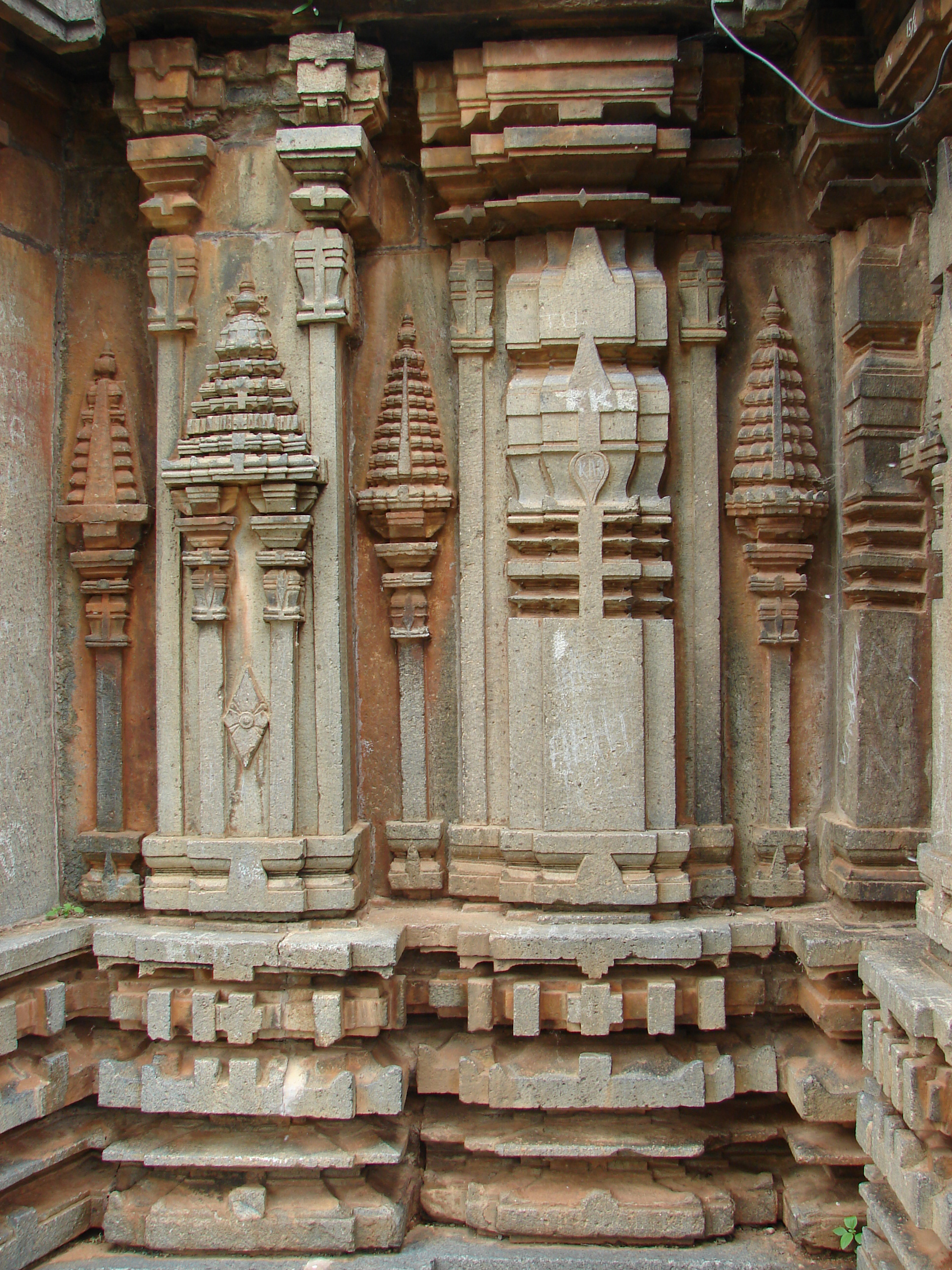
Miniature decorative towers (aedicule) on half-pilasters at Chennakeshava temple, Turuvekere

According to the art historian Adam Hardy, the temple plan is a distinctive dravida (south Indian) single vimana (one sanctum and superstructure over it, called ekakuta) structure built on a semi-stellate base (semi-star shape). The building material is the standard Soap stone and the hall (mantapa) is a closed one.

The temple has all the basic elements of a standard Hoysala temple and comprises a sanctum which is connected to a closed hall by a square vestibule (sukhanasi). The entrance into the hall from the outside is through a porch (mukhamantapa). Typically, a closed hall in a Hoysala temple has no windows. The porch consists of an awning supported by two decorative half pillars with two parapets on both sides. The shrine has a tower (called shikhara). The vestibule has its own tower (also called sukhanasi) which appears like a low extension of the main tower over the shrine. Art critic Gerard Foekema calls it the "nose" of the main tower. From the outside, the walls of the vestibule are inconspicuous and appear like a short extension of the shrine wall. The ceiling of the closed hall is supported by four lathe turned pillars. These pillars divide the ceiling into nine highly decorated bays. Between full pilasters, the outer walls of the hall and shrine are decorated with turrets and miniature towers on half-pilasters (aedicula). Below these, forming the base of the temple, are the five horizontal moldings.
