= Adihalli (Krishnarajpet) =

- village
- Interactive map of Adihalli
- Coordinates: 12.7832°N 76.5516°E
- Country: India
- State: Karnataka
- District: Mandya
- Talukas: Krishnarajpet

Government
  - Body: Village Panchayat

Languages
  - Official: Kannada
- Time zone: UTC+5:30 (IST)
- Postal code: 571436
- Nearest city: Krishnarajapet
- Civic agency: Village Panchayat

Adihalli (Krishnarajpet) is a village in the southern state of Karnataka, India. It is located in the Krishnarajpet taluk of Mandya district in Karnataka.

== See also ==
- Mandya
- Districts of Karnataka
