= Banasandra =

- village
- Interactive map of Banasandra
- Coordinates: 13°16′N 76°39′E
- Country: India
- State: Karnataka

Languages
  - Official: Kannada
- Time zone: UTC+5:30 (IST)
- PIN: 572212
- Telephone code: 8139
- Nearest city: Tumkur

Banasandra is a small town north of Turuvekere, India. It is a commerce hub for Turuvekere region due to its junction of roads and railway systems. Indian Railways operates a track route through the area. It is situated 56 kilometres (35 mi) west of the Tumakur district headquarters, 17 kilometres (11 mi) from Turuvekere, and 124 kilometres (77 mi) from the state capital, Bangalore.

== Demographics ==
As of the 2011 India census, Banasandra was home to 2,385 people, and had a literacy rate of 78.92%.

== Commerce ==
Since the early 1950s, Banasandra has been the home of many mineral and ore transportation companies. Manganese ore was transported here from the northern part of Chikkanayakana Halli and exported to different parts of the world after the quality assessment was done.

== Education ==
Banasandra is home to both VSS High School and VSS Junior College, and serves as an educational hub for the surrounding villages. VSS High School was established as a cooperative society in the 1960s and has since become part of the Government Aided High School system. Despite this change, it continues to operate as a cooperative society.
