= Narasimharajapura =

Narasimharajapura N.R Pura
- Town
- Location in Karnataka, India
- Coordinates: 13.62°N 75.52°E
- Country: India
- State: Karnataka
- District: Chikmagalur
- Region: Malenadu
- Named for: Kanteerava Narasimharaja Wadiyar

Government
  - Body: Town Panchayat

Area
  - Town: 1.72 km^{2} (0.66 sq mi)
  - Rural: 731.79 km^{2} (282.55 sq mi)
- Elevation: 697 m (2,287 ft)

Population (2011)
  - Town: 7,458
  - Density: 4,340/km^{2} (11,200/sq mi)
  - Rural: 58,632

Languages
  - Official: Kannada
- Time zone: UTC+5:30 (IST)
- PIN: 577134
- Vehicle registration: KA-66, KA-18
- Website: www.narasimharajapuratown.mrc.gov.in

Narasimharajapura or NRpura is a town and taluk headquarter in Chikkmagaluru district, Karnataka, India. It is situated in the Malenadu region of the district. In 1915, Yuvaraja Shri Narasimharaja Wodeyar visited Yedehalli and in his memory, the town was named after him. The taluk was ruled by Ganga, Kadamba, Santhara, Hoysala and Vijayanagara kings.

== Geography ==
Narasimharajapura is located at 13.62°N 75.53°E and has an average elevation of 697 m (2,287 ft). It is located 86 km from its district headquarter Chikkamagaluru, 250 km from Mysuru and 320 km from the state capital Bengaluru. Nearest major city is Shivamogga at 55 km.

== Demographics ==
As of the 2001 Indian census, Narasimharajapura had a population of 7,441; 51% of the population are males and 49% are females. Narasimharajapura has an average literacy rate of 91%, higher than the state average of 75.3%: male literacy is 93%, and female literacy is 88%. In Narasimharajapura, 12% of the population is under 6 years of age.

== Attractions ==
The Shri Atishaya Kshetra Simhanagadde is located near the town and is famous for being the Atishaya (place of miracles) of Jwalamalini. It is located in the town of Simhanagadde near Narasimharajapura in Chikmagalur district.

Kshetra Simhanagadde is famous for the Atishaya (place of miracles) of Jwalamalini Devi – Yakshini (guardian spirit) of the Eighth Tirthankara, Chandraprabha in Jainism.

== Transport ==
- Nearest airport: Mangalore International Airport (155 km) and Shivamogga Airport (50 km)
- Nearest railway station: Bhadravathi (BDVT) (51 km)

== Notable people ==
- M. K. Indira – popular Kannada novelist
- Sudeep – well-known actor in Kannada cinema
- H.C.Kapinipathi Bhatta – First Engineer from N.R.Pura, who worked closely with Sir M. Visweswariah.
