= Turuvekere =

Town in Karnataka, India

- town
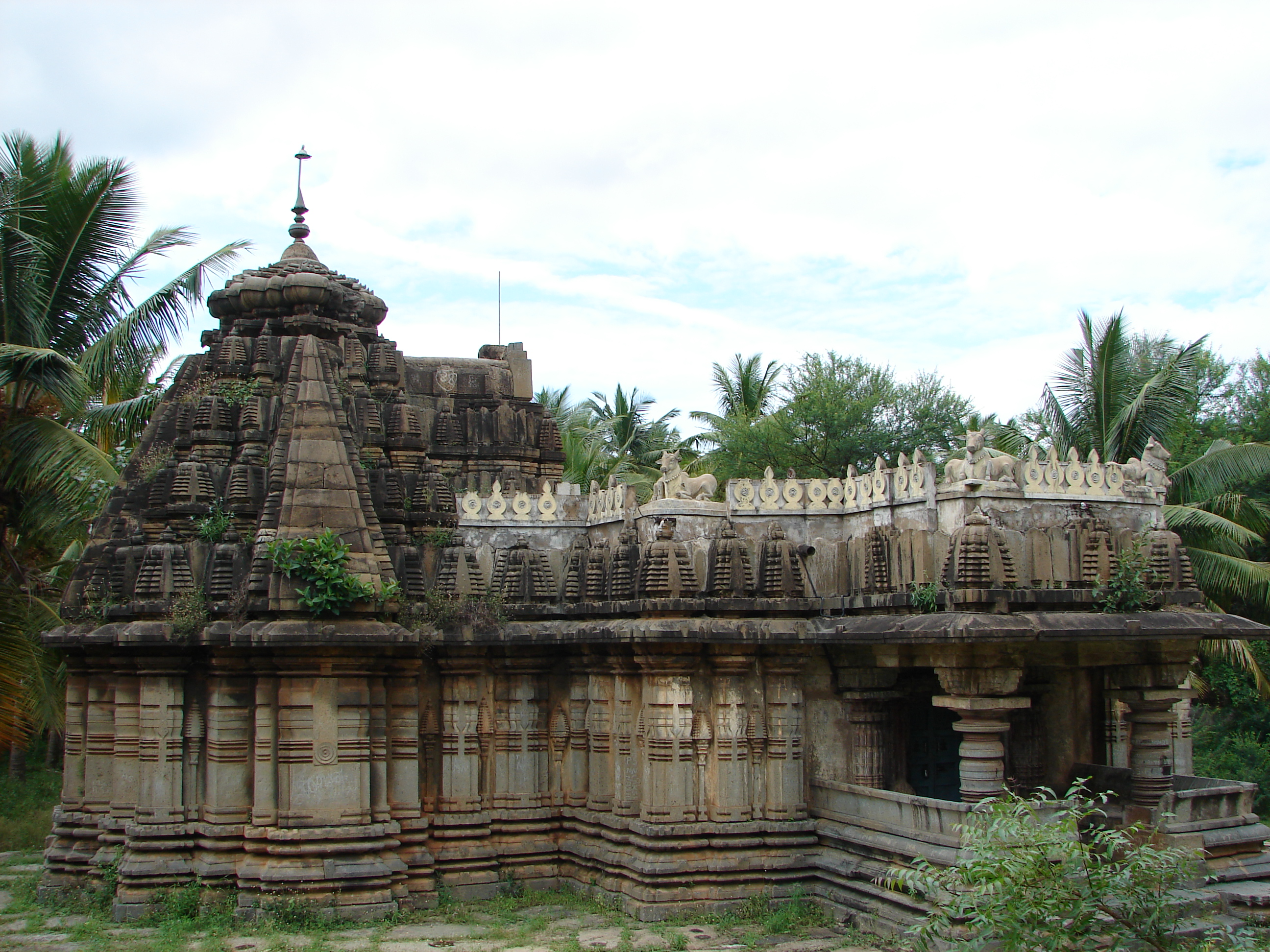
- Shankareshvara temple, a Hoysala construction of 1260 AD

- Location in Karnataka, India
- Coordinates: 13.16°N 76.67°E
- Country: India
- State: Karnataka
- District: Tumkur
- Elevation: 794 m (2,605 ft)

Population (2001)
  - Total: 13,275

Languages
  - Official: Kannada
- Time zone: UTC+5:30 (IST)
- PIN: 572227

Turuvekere is a panchayat town and Taluk in Tumakuru district in the Indian state of Karnataka.

== Geography ==
Turuvekere is located at 13.16°N 76.67°E, about 12 km, South of the Banasandra railway station. It has an average elevation of 794 metres (2604 feet).

== Demographics ==
As of 2001 India census, Turuvekere had a population of 13,275. Males constitute 52% of the population and females 48%. Turuvekere has an average literacy rate of 73%, higher than the national average of 59.5%: male literacy is 78%, and female literacy is 69%. In Turuvekere, 11% of the population is under 6 years of age.

== History ==
Turuvekere was once an "Agrahara" or "Rent-Free Village" granted to scholarly Brahmins in the 13th century A.D.

== Temples ==
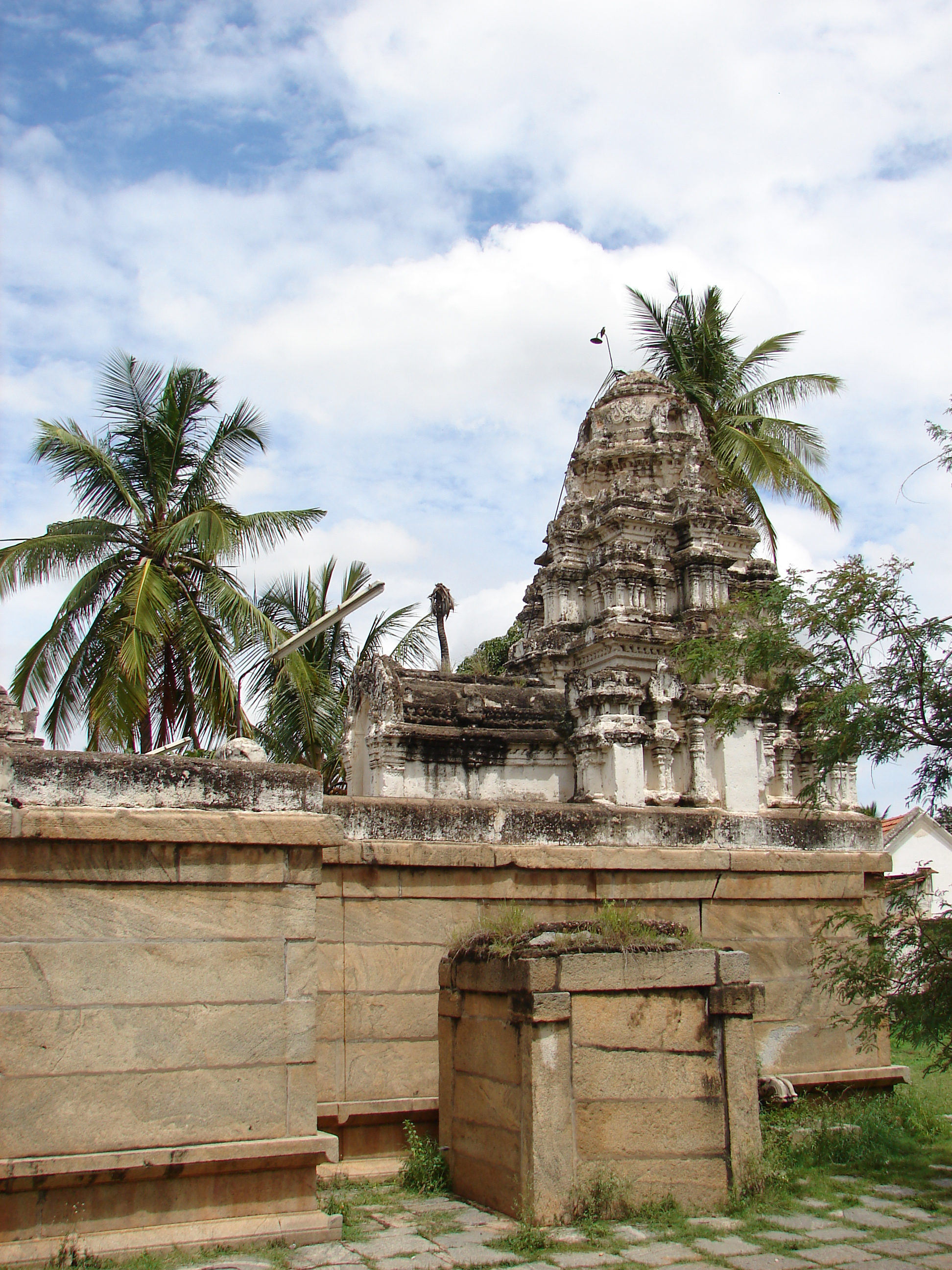
The Gangadeshvara temple at Turuvekere

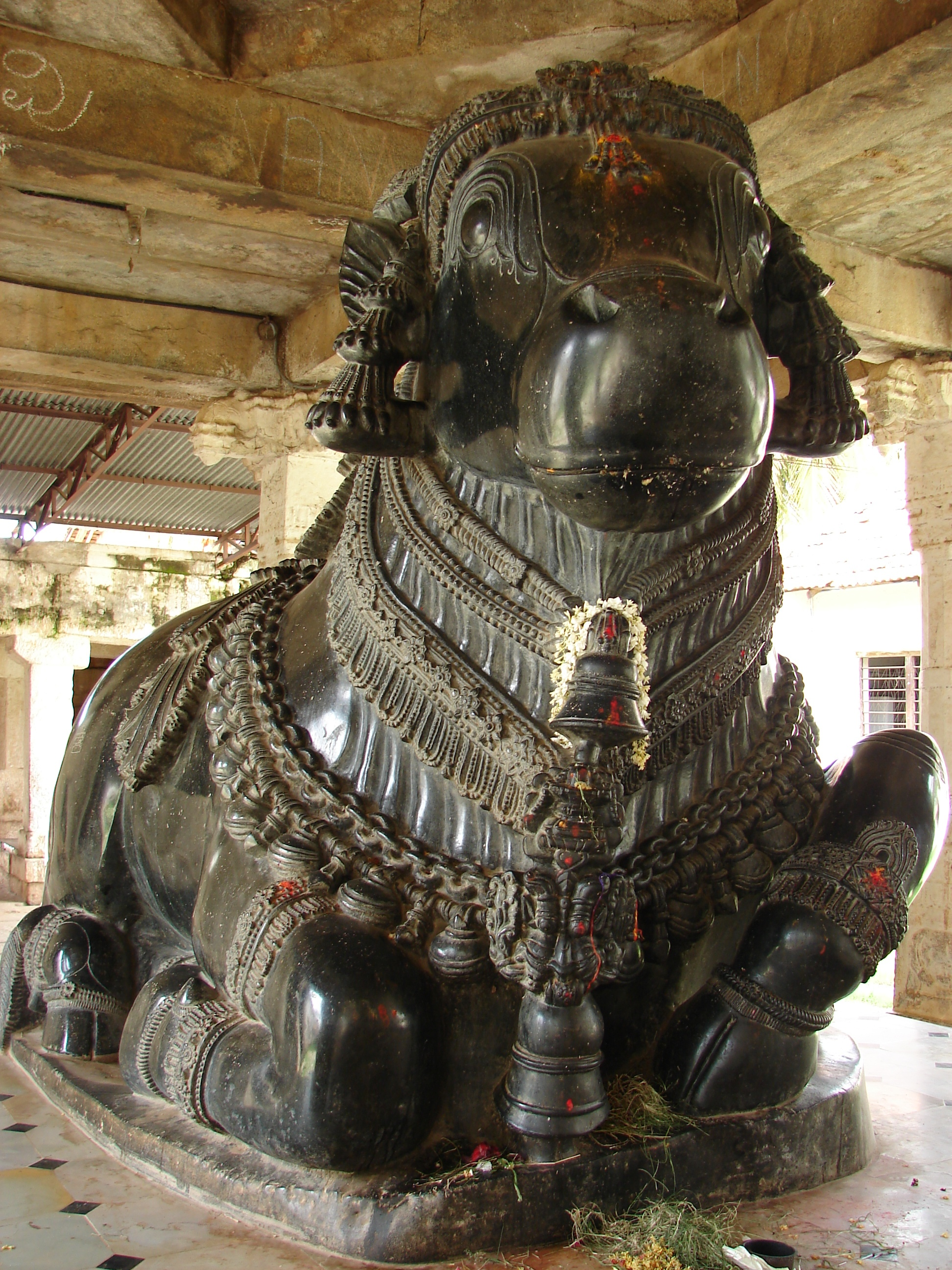
Nandi (bull) in the Gangadeshvara temple is made of soap stone

Turuvekere is home to a number of Hoysala temples, including the Temple of Chennakeshava Temple built by Mahadandanayaka Somanna, the Gangadhareshwara Temple, Chennigaraya Swamy Temple, Moole Shankareshwara Temple, and the largest, Beterayaswamy Temple.

- Kanchiraaya Swamy temple is located on top of a hill near Neeragunda and Ajjanahalli villages. This place is 12 km from Kibbanahalli cross and 4 km from Aralaguppe.
- Hulikeramma temple in Hulikere
- Sri Ranganathaswamy temple is located on top of hill at Aremallenehalli village, around 10 km from Turuvekere.
- Udusalammadevi temple - Adbuta Sidi.
- Beteraya swamy temple - Bramharathotsava.
- Veerabadreshwaraswamy temple - Agnikunda Mahothsava.
- Honnadevi Temple - Dandinashivara
- Nooraondhu gudi - which is known for its rare kind of saligramas.
- Sri Ranganathaswamy and Honnamma devi temple Muniyuru
- Sri Shanidevara temple, Attikullepalya, Muniyuru village

== Notable people ==
- B. M. Srikantaiah-author, writer and translator of Kannada literature.
- Master Hirannayya - drama artist from Kanathur village of Turuvekere taluk.
- Jaggesh - noted Kannada actor is from Mayasandra village of Turuvekere taluk.
- Komal Kumar-Indian actor and film producer known for his work in Kannada cinema
- Gowrishankara CK- Notable scientist with ISRO currently one of the Project Director in the nations prestigious Gaganyaan Project

== See also ==
- Ajjenahalli, Turuvekere
