= Bangalore–Arsikere–Hubli line =

Railway line in India

KSR Bengaluru–Arsikere–Hubballi line
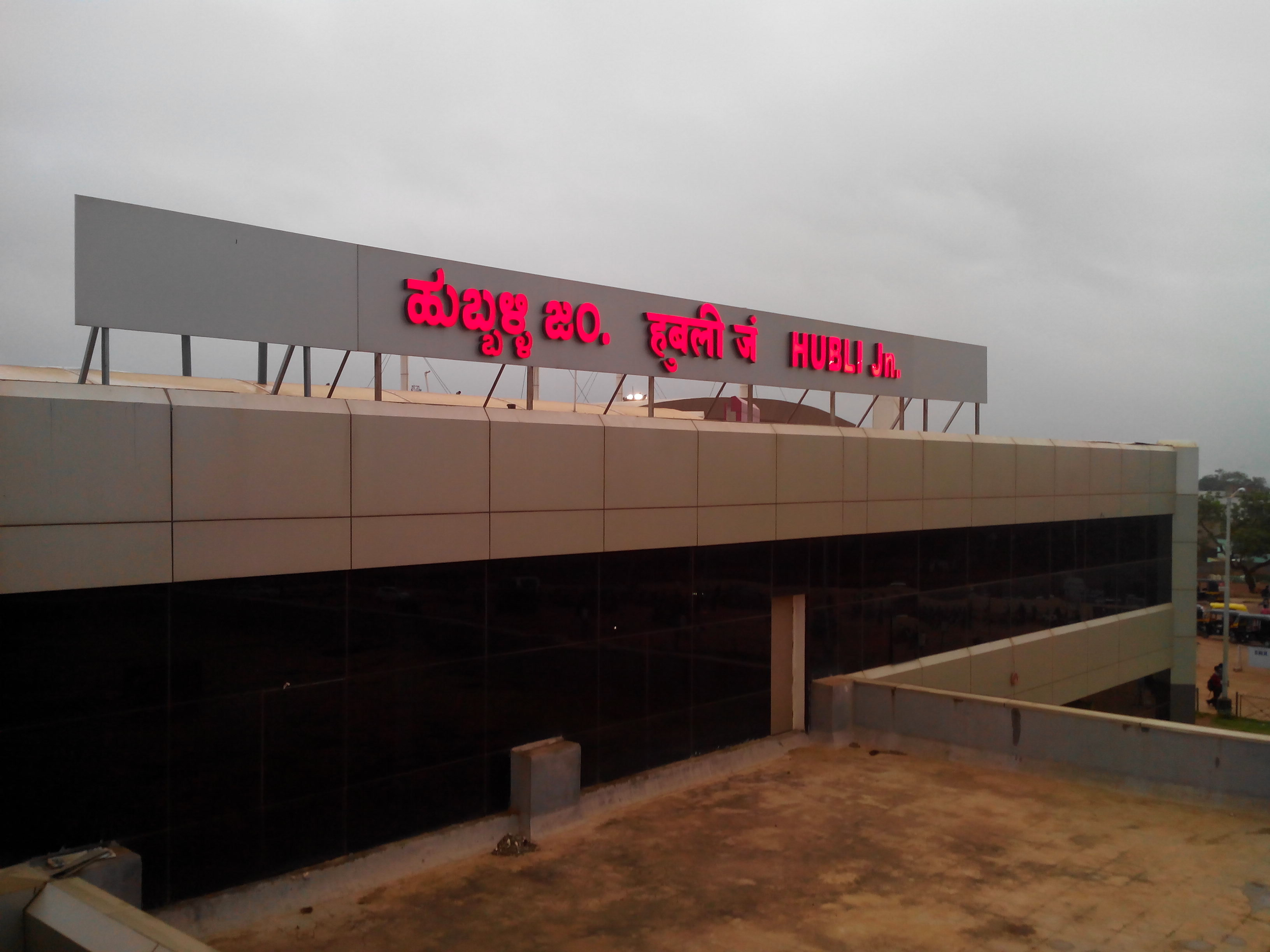
- KSR Bengaluru, Tumakuru, Arsikere Junction, Kadur Junction, Davanagere, and Hubballi are major stations on the Bengaluru–Arsikere–Hubballi line

Overview
- Status: Operational
- Owner: Indian Railways
- Locale: Karnataka
- Termini: KSR Bengaluru (SBC); SSS Hubballi (UBL)

Service
- Type: Main line
- System: Indian Railways
- Services: 1
- Operator: South Western Railway zone

Technical
- Line length: 469 km (291 mi)
- Num of tracks: 2
- Track gauge: 1,676 mm (5 ft 6 in)
- Electrification: 25 kV 50 Hz AC overhead line
- Operating speed: 110 km/h (68 mph)

The KSR Bengaluru–Arsikere–SSS Hubballi line is a major railway line in the Indian state of Karnataka connecting the state capital Bengaluru with the city of Hubballi in north-central Karnataka. It traverses across Karnataka and links several cities of Karnataka, including Tumakuru, Kadur, Davanagere, Haveri and Hubballi. Currently, 29 pairs of trains operate in this route, out of which 8 are daily services. Apart from this, this route also links Karnataka with other states, such as Goa, Maharashtra, Gujarat and Rajasthan. This route is also a major feeder line for iron ore, coal and steel hauling freight trains originating from Ballari district towards the Ports of Goa (via Braganza Ghats) and Mangaluru (via Shiradi Ghats).

The maximum operating speed of this route is 110 km/h for passenger trains and 75 km/h for freight trains. The fastest passenger service in this line is KSR Bengaluru–Dharwad Vande Bharat Express, which covers the two cities in 6h 40m, at an average speed of 76 km/h.

== Main line and branches ==
The main line of the Bengaluru–Arsikere–Hubballi section is 469 km (291 mi) in length and has five branch lines:

- Chikkabanavara–Hassan–Arsikere line: 211 km (131 mi) via Shravanabelagola
- Kadur–Chikkamagaluru line: 45 km (28 mi)
- Birur–Talaguppa line: 160 km (99 mi)
- Chikjajur–Ballari line: 185 km (115 mi)
- Amaravathi Colony–Hosapete line: 135 km (84 mi) (branching after Davanagere)

== Doubling and electrification ==
The entire stretch between KSR Bengaluru and SSS Hubballi is completely electrified and most of trains running in this section run behind AC traction.
