= Chikmagalur Seetaramiah Seshadri =

Indian Administrator (1918-1998)

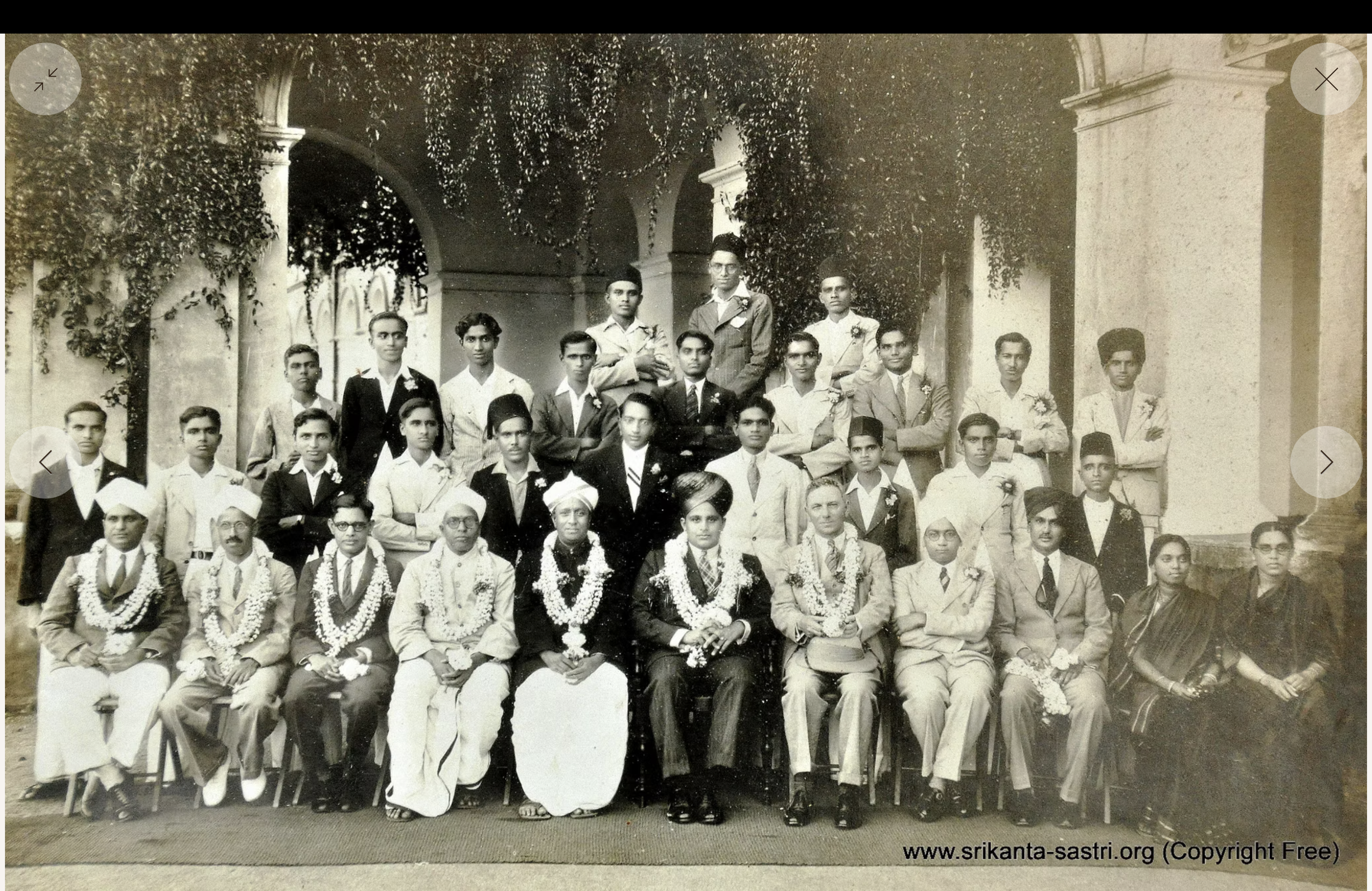
Photo of C. S. Seshadri with Jayachamarajendra Wodeyar (8th from left in first row), the prince of Mysore, at B.A. Honours graduation from Maharaja's College, Mysore

Chikmagalur Seetaramiah Seshadri (1918–February 12,1998), also abbreviated as C. S. Seshadri, was an Indian civil servant who served in the Indian Administrative Service (IAS) from the early 1940s until his retirement in 1978. Over a career spanning nearly four decades, he held multiple administrative positions in British India and post-independence India, including Kanakapura, as an Administrator of Mahe, and Commissioner of Labour for Mysore State (now Karnataka). He was later active in civic and professional life in Bangalore including being one of the early Directors of the Institute for Social and Economic Change (1977-1978), succeeding its founding director V. K. R. V. Rao.

== Early life and career ==
C. S. Seshadri entered the civil services around 1942, possibly through the Indian Civil Service (ICS), the predecessor of the IAS. He transitioned into the Indian Administrative Service after India's independence in 1947. One of his early assignments was as Assistant Commissioner in Kanakapura, with later assignments as administrator at Tiptur and in Belgaum. In these roles, he managed land revenue, law and order, and the implementation of developmental programs.

== Administrator of Mahe (1954–1956) ==
Seshadri served as the regional administrator of Mahe, a part of former french India on the Malabar Coast, from 27 December 1954 to 27 January 1956. His tenure followed the peaceful transfer of power from French to Indian control. He was tasked with establishing Indian administrative systems in Mahe and facilitating the region's integration into the Union of India. His leadership marked one of the early phases of post-colonial governance in the progress towards setting up the Union Territory of Puducherry.

== Career in Mysore State ==
Following his tenure in Mahe, Seshadri returned to Mysore State (renamed Karnataka in 1973), where he rose through the ranks of the state civil service. He served as the Commissioner of Labour, overseeing industrial relations and enforcement of labor laws in the state. As the Director of the department of Economics and Statistics, he participated in the preparation of the report of the Mysore Pay Commission (1966-68). In a 1966 High Court case, his name appears among senior officials who advocated for fair administrative practices and supported merit-based promotions within the Labour Department. In the mid 1960s, he was the managing director of the Mahboob Shahi Gulbarga Mills in the (then) Mysore which had become a government owned corporation in 1962 and had an authorised share capital Rs. 1.25 crores as a result of the state government acquiring majority shareholding. In September 1967, he was appointed as Officer on Special Duty under the Chief Director, National Sample Survey. He was involved in strengthening of the functioning of state financial corporations as a member of a Working Group set up by the Reserve Bank of India to study the problems in these corporations, particularly focusing on resource mobilisation and expanding the scope of the activities of these corporations.

His contributions to Karnataka's administration extended through the 1960s and 1970s, and he held senior secretarial roles in the state government prior to retirement.

== Post-retirement and civic engagement ==
After retiring from government service in 1976, Seshadri remained active in civic affairs. He served as the president of the Bangalore Management Association (BMA) during 1979–1980, where he contributed to professional education and organizational development. He served as a Director of Triton Valves Limited in 1997 and was its chairman from 1978 until his demise in 1998.
