= Prabhakaran (name) =

Prabhakaran பிரபாகரன்
- Gender: Male
- Language: Tamil

Origin
- Region of origin: Southern India; North-eastern Sri Lanka

Other names
- Alternative spelling: Prabakaran
- Short form: Prabhakar

Prabhakaran or Prabakaran (Tamil: பிரபாகரன்) is a Tamil male given name. Due to the Tamil tradition of using patronymic surnames it may also be a surname for males and females.

== Notable people ==
=== Given name ===
- A. Prabhakaran, Indian politician
- Dorairaj Prabhakaran, Indian researcher
- Inigo Prabhakar (born 1985), Indian actor
- K. P. Prabhakaran (died 2009), Indian politician
- K. P. Prabhakaran Nair, Indian agronomist
- K. R. P. Prabakaran (born 1979), Indian politician
- Kalamandalam Prabhakaran, Indian dancer
- Lakshmanan Prabhakaran, Indian hockey player
- M. Prabhakaran, Indian politician
- N. Prabhakaran (born 1952), Indian writer
- Prabakaran Kanadasan (born 1991), Malaysian footballer
- Prabakaran Parameswaran (born 1996), Malaysian politician
- Prayar Prabhakaran (1930–2004), Indian academic
- S. R. Prabhakaran, Indian film director
- Shaji Prabhakaran, Indian football administrator
- Sreekumar Prabhakaran, Indian air force officer
- Thachadi Prabhakaran (1936–2000), Indian politician
- Velu Prabhakaran (1957–2025), Indian filmmaker
- Velupillai Prabhakaran (1955–2009), Sri Lankan militant leader

=== Surname ===
- Arjun Prabhakaran, Indian film director
- Justin Prabhakaran (born 1986), Indian composer
- Prabhakaran Gopalakrishnan (born 1988), Indian cricketer
- Shyam Prabhakaran, American physician

== Other uses ==
- Captain Prabhakaran, 1991 Indian Tamil-language film
- Killing of Balachandran Prabhakaran, killing of the 12-year old son of Velupillai Prabhakaran
- Prabhakaran (film), 2008 Sri Lankan Sinhala-language film
