= Battle of Kanagala =

- Part of Vijayanagar Campaigns in South
| Date | March, 1662 |
| Location | Kanagale, Karnataka, India 16.29°N 74.60°E |
| Result | Vijayanagara-Keladi victory |

Belligerents
| Vijayanagar Empire: Keladi Nayakas | Kingdom of Mysore |

Commanders and leaders
| Sriranga III; Bhadrappa Nayaka; Shivalinga Nayaka † | Devaraja Wodeyar I Kantaiya |
- Location within South Asia

The Battle of Kanagala (1662) was a military conflict fought between the Keladi Nayakas under Shivalinga Nayaka and the Kingdom of Mysore under Dalavai Kantaiya of Kalale. The battle took place near Kanagala. It ended in a Keladi victory, with Kantaiya being defeated and forced to retreat. However, the Keladi commander Shivalinga Nayaka was struck by an arrow during the fighting and was killed on the battlefield.

== Background ==
After the death of Shivappa Nayaka on 25 September 1660, tensions between the Keladi Nayakas and the Kingdom of Mysore remained high and the possibility of renewed war continued. To guard against a Mysore encroachments, Venkatappa Nayaka stationed an army on the frontier under the command of Shivalinga Nayaka, the son-in-law of Shivappa Nayaka.

As anticipated Mysore resumed hostilities and toward the end of 1661 laid siege to and captured the fort of Hebbale. The Keladi response came under Bhadrappa Nayaka who succeeded Venkatappa Nayaka. In early 1662, Bhadrappa marched against Hebbale in an effort to recover the fort.

== Battle ==
Soon after his accession, Bhadrappa Nayaka dispatched an army under the command of Shivalinga Nayaka against the Kingdom of Mysore. Advancing towards Belur, Shivalinga Nayaka appears to have met Sriranga III and, after being reinforced by the emperor's army, marched towards Hebbale. There he relieved the fort, which had come under attack from Mysore during the reign of Venkatappa Nayaka. Continuing his advance, Shivalinga Nayaka moved deeper into Mysore territory and laid siege to Holenarasipura (Narasimhapura), which was then under Kingdom of Mysore control.

The Mysore army however, captured the fort of Konanur, prompting the Keladi army to march against it and prepare for its recapture. At this stage, Devaraja Wodeyar I sent reinforcements under his general Kantaiya of Kalale. Around March 1662, Kantaiya established his camp on the slopes overlooking Kanagala positioning his forces to support Mysore's operations in the region.

Shivalinga Nayaka marched against Kantaiya who established his camp in Kanagala In the battle that followed, both sides fought fiercely. In the end, Mysore's general Kantaiya was defeated and forced to retreat. However, the Keladi commander Shivalinga Nayaka was struck by an arrow during the fighting and was killed on the battlefield.

== Aftermath ==
Following the death of the Keladi commander Shivalinga Nayaka, Bhadrappa Nayaka continued the war. Keladi forces captured Honnavalli, Chikkanayakanahalli, Kandikere, Budivala, and several other places on the frontier of the Kingdom of Mysore. Meanwhile, Mysore's general Kantaiya of Kalale, was succeeded by Nanjanathaiya in April 1662.

== See also ==
- Bednur
- Mangalore
- Goa
