= Chaluvanahalli =

Coordinates: 13°23′N 76°11′E

- Village
- Interactive map of Chaluvanahalli
- Country: India
- State: Karnataka
- District: Hassan
- Subdistrict: Banavara
- Time zone: UTC+05:30 (IST)
- Pincode: 573112

Chaluvanahalli is a village in Banavara Hobli, Arasikere Taluk, Hassan District, Karnataka, India Pin-573112. It is located between Arasikere and Banavara, 11 km from Arasikere and 3 km from Banavara. The National Highway NH-206 runs through the village outskirts. There is Hill view Place in the village called Gavimata, which are special caves called KallaraGavi (Robber's cave). These caves are mysterious. There is a Kalyani (Sacred Pond) and a temple.

The Chaluvanahalli has two historic temples, Ishwara Temple and Hanumaan Temple, in the interior of the village.
