= Prasannavadan Bhagwanji Desai =

Indian demographer and economist

P. B. Desai
- Born: Prasannavadan Bhagwanji Desai; 2 October 1924; Chikhli, Gujarat, India
- Died: 11 November 1994 (aged 70); Ahmedabad, Gujarat, India
- Occupation: Professor
- Title: Director, Institute of Economic Growth, New Delhi
- Spouse: Lina Desai

Professor P. B. Desai (1924–1994) was an Indian demographer and economist. He was director of the Institute of Economic Growth (IEG) in New Delhi from 1974 to 1976. He headed the Population Research Center at the institute for many years.

Desai also served as honorary director of Centre for Parliamentarians on Population and Development in New Delhi. He was founder-member of Indian Society for the Study of Population (IASP), and its president from 1977 to 1979. He was editor of the journal Demography India from its inception in 1972 to 1980, and editor-in-chief from 1980 to 1987. Desai was Rapporteur General at the United Nations world population conference in Bucharest in 1974. Other associations included those with Planning Commission of India, Ministry of Health and Family Welfare, National Institute of Urban Affairs, Delhi Planning Board, Family Planning Foundation of India and International Review Group on Social Science Research. He additionally served as a fellow at University of Michigan in Ann Arbor.

After retirement from IEG, Desai worked in Peace Research Center at Gujarat Vidyapith in Ahmedabad.

== Works ==
• V.K.R.V. Rao, P. B. Desai. Greater Delhi A Study in Urbanization 1940-1957. Bombay, Asia Publishing House, 1965.

• Size and Sex Composition of Population in India 1901-1961. P. B. Desai. Published by Asia Publishing House, 1969.

• Studies in Demography, Ashish Bose, P. B. Desai, and S. P. Jain (eds), Chapel Hill, Univ of North Carolina Press, 1972.

• Regional perspective of industrial and urban growth: the case of Kanpur. Papers and proceedings of the International Seminar on Urban and Industrial Growth of Kanpur Region January 29 to February 4, 1967. Chief editor: P. B. Desai; associate editors: I. M. Grossack [and] K. N. Sharma. Published by MacMillan, 1969.

• P. B Desai. A survey of research in demography: A project sponsored by the Indian Council of Social Science Research, New Delhi.

• Studies in Social Dynamics of Primary Health Care. Ashish Bose, P. B. Desai. Published by Springer.

• Population in the Context of India's Development With Special Reference to Population Education. Prasannavadan Bhagwanji Desai. Published by UGC-UNFPA Project, Task Force on Curriculum Development, Population Education Resource Centre, Department of Adult & Continuing Education & Extension Work, Gujarat Vidyapith. 1987.

• Report of the Orientation Programme for Maharashtra Legislators on Population and Development. Prasannavadan Bhagwanji Desai. Published by Indian Association of Parliamentarians on Population and Development. 1991.

• Planning in India, 1951-1978. By P. B. Desai. Published by Vikas Publishing House. 1979.

== Personal life ==
Desai was a Gandhian and a freedom fighter. He was jailed for about 10 months during the Indian independence movement, including in solitary confinement for some time.
