= Ballekere =

Balleker
- village
- Location in Karnataka, India
- Coordinates: 13.495°N 76.035°E
- Country: India
- State: Karnataka
- District: Chikkamagaluru

Population (2011)
  - Total: 1,157

Languages
  - Official: Kannada
- Time zone: UTC+5:30 (IST)
- PIN: 577548
- Vehicle registration: KA-66

Ballekere is a village near Kadur of Chikkamagaluru district of Karnataka, India.

It is known for being visited by Former Prime Minister Indira Gandhi during her election campaign, where she contested by-election from the Chickmagaluru constituency following Indian emergency. The village now belongs to the Hassan constituency. Every March the religious and cultural event Anjaneya Jatra Mahothsava is organized by the people of Ballekere.

== 2011 Census details ==
Population Census Parameter Census Data Total Population 1157 Total No of Houses 288 Female Population 49.4% ( 572) Total Literacy rate 67.0% ( 775) Female Literacy rate 29.2% ( 338) Scheduled Tribes Population 0.0% ( 0) Scheduled Caste Population 22.5% ( 260) Working Population 53.6% Child(0 -6) Population by 2011 81

Ballekere's Local Language is Kannada. Ballekere's total population is 1157, and the number of houses is 288. Females account for 49.4% of the population.

== Local governance and amenities ==
The village is governed by the village panchayat headed by a Sarpanch (Head of Village) along with Panchayti members who are the elected representatives of the village. They are assisted by the local bureaucrats, the PDO and bill collector, who were appointed by the Government of Karnataka.

The village offers a Government-run primary school up to grade 7. Also available is a primary health care centre, located close to the Sri Anjaneya Swami Temple.

== Agriculture and irrigation ==
The main occupation of the people is agriculture, with the main crops being Ragi, Jowar, Groundnut, and Sunflower. These low water demanding crops are preferred by the farmers, since the farming practice of the area is rainfed agriculture.

Presently there is no irrigation available in the village however; a small reservoir is available in close proximity which is rain-dependent. There are plans to connect this reservoir with Ayyanakere to assist farmers. The area is prone to droughts, as the village is situated geographically in the rain shadow region of the Western Ghats.

== Transport ==
Ballekere is about 7 km away from Kadur. Ballekere Halt railway station is located approximately 1 km from the village, where it connects to cities such as Bengaluru, Mysuru, Shimoga, and Hubli.

== Languages ==
The primary local language is Kannada.

== Schools in Ballekere ==
G.h.p.s. Ballekere Address : ballekere, kadur, chikkamangalore, Karnataka . PIN- 577548, Post - Kadur Town

== Government health centers near Ballekere ==
1) Located near Anjaneya Swami Temple.

== Cultural rituals ==
Traditionally, the village celebrates "Sri Anjaneya Swamy Ratotsava" every year, along with the locally played drama "Sri Shani Mahatme Pouranika Nataka". And also holi is happening after the completion of Jatra mahotsava Other vital rituals like "Hanuma Mala" during the Sankranti period, and "Ambu" during the Navarathri period, are also celebrated annually.

== See also ==
- Ballecer
