= Adinayakanahalli =

Coordinates: 13°19′N 76°30′E

- village
- Interactive map of Adinayakanahalli
- Country: India
- State: Karnataka
- District: Tumkur
- Talukas: Tiptur

Government
  - Body: Village Panchayat

Languages
  - Official: Kannada
- Time zone: UTC+5:30 (IST)
- Nearest city: Tumkur
- Civic agency: Village Panchayat

Adinayakanahalli is a village in the southern state of Karnataka, India. It is located in the Tiptur taluk of Tumkur district in Karnataka. It is adjacent to Halepalya which is a famous centre for weaving pure silk sarees, artificial silk sarees and "Apoorva" sarees. Apoorva sarees are favourite of women aged between 30 and 50 years. They appear in all the colours of rainbow. They come with borders of various sizes and small flower butas all over. There are nearly one thousand families scattered around Halepalya namely Annapura, Gayathrinagar, Shankaranagara, Manjunathanagara, Shanthinagara etc. The children of Adilakshminagara go to Halepalya High school where they learn English and other subjects.

== See also ==
- Tumkur
- Districts of Karnataka
