= P. K. Michael Tharakan =

Indian academic

P. K. Michael Tharakan is a senior academic, historian and social science researcher from Kerala state in southern India. He is the Chairman of the Kerala Council for Historical Research and has served in several senior academic positions such as the Professor at the social science research institute Institute for Social and Economic Change Bangalore and Vice-Chancellor of Kannur University during 2009–2013.

Tharakan has authored many books and articles and known for his work on documenting and analyzing the history of modern Kerala such as on land reforms and on social characteristics such as its focus on health, care-based professions, education, communalism and social harmony.

== Publications ==
- Tharakan, Parayil Kochupappu Michael (2008). When the Kerala Model of Development is Historicised: A Chronological Perspective.
