= BIMARU states =

Group of states in India with poor economic condition

Map of BIMARU States, Former states are in light orange.

BIMARU (Hindi: बीमारू, Urdu: بیمارو, romanized: Bīmārū) is an acronym formed from the names of the states of Bihar, Madhya Pradesh, Rajasthan and Uttar Pradesh in India. The term is a play on the word "bimar" meaning sick and has a derogatory meaning. It was coined by demographer Ashish Bose in the mid-1980s as the BIMARU states collectively scored low on the Human Development Index. The present-day states of Chhattisgarh, Jharkhand and Uttarakhand were part of Madhya Pradesh, Bihar, and Uttar Pradesh, respectively, when the BIMARU acronym was coined. All of these are in the Hindi Belt, which also has the relatively richer states of Haryana, Himachal Pradesh, Delhi, Chandigarh, and Uttarakhand. The acronym has also been used as a pejorative for the people originating from these states.

The acronym is regarded as outdated and not so often used today and during 2008–2011, some of BIMARU states had higher growth rate so some argued that the BIMARU concept was outdated. However, these states have a low economic base, and thus despite higher rate of growth, they remain much poorer than other states. The concept has re-emerged since 2015 due to the faltering growth rates of the states.

== Etymology ==
In the mid-1980s, economic analyst Ashish Bose coined the acronym BIMARU, in a paper submitted to then Prime Minister Rajiv Gandhi. Several studies, including those by the UN, showed that the performance of the BIMARU states affected the GDP growth rate of India. Bīmār (Hindi: बीमार, Urdu: بیمار) in Hindustani means 'sick', so BIMARU refers to the poor economic conditions of these states.

== Improvements and former BIMARU states ==
Uttarakhand is now a relatively-developed state and is no longer in the BIMARU category because of its economic growth, education, healthcare and more when compared with the other states formed. Uttarakhand is the only state for which all the districts are in the category of top 25% HDI districts. Dehradun, the winter capital of Uttarakhand, is known for its good quality education and also hosts the top schools in the country. It is also known as the school capital of India. The state also hosts top schools of the country in its other cities as well with a number of higher education institutes, notable being Garhwal University, Kumaon University, an IIT at Roorkee and an NIT at Srinagar, Uttarakhand.

Madhya Pradesh, once labelled a BIMARU state, has seen tremendous growth, especially in its agricultural sector, and has quadrupled its GDP between 2011 and 2024. Uttarakhand, after it was split from Uttar Pradesh and made a separate state, has made tremendous progress. Rajasthan and Chhattisgarh fall in the middle category of Human Development Index. Bihar, Uttar Pradesh and Jharkhand lag in several indices.

In recent times, some of the states have experienced high growth rates, but they still lag behind the more developed states. Madhya Pradesh was second in the United Nations GDP development ranking's with a record of 225%. Bihar's GDP grew by 80% from 2006 to 2007, which was higher than in the two prior years, which was one of the highest recorded by the Government of India for that period. They have laid greater emphasis on education and learning by appointing more teachers and opening a software park. Bihar and Uttar Pradesh contribute significantly to the Indian Army, Central Industrial Security Force, Border Security Force, National Security Guard, Indian Air Force and many paramilitary forces because of their large young populations. Recently, these states are working for their improvement by developing infrastructure, IT parks and becoming more inviting to businesspeople for investment.

== Key metrics ==
=== Population growth ===
The BIMARU states have some of the highest fertility rates in India, which has led to a higher population growth in these states compared to rest of India. In 2010, the total fertility rate was 3.9 for Bihar, 3.5 for Uttar Pradesh, 3.2 for Madhya Pradesh and 3.1 for Rajasthan, compared to 2.5 for India as a whole. While in 2024, it was 3.0 for Bihar, 2.7 for Uttar Pradesh, 2.6 for Madhya Pradesh and 2.4 for Rajasthan, compared to 2.0 for India.

=== Literacy rates ===
The literacy rates in these states in 2023-24 are Bihar (74.3%), Rajasthan (75.8%), Jharkhand (76.7%), Madhya Pradesh (75.2%) and Uttar Pradesh (78.2%), compared to the national average of 80.9%.

=== Health care ===
The life expectancy in the BIMARU states is lower than other Indian states and is lower than the average life expectancy of India as a whole. That implies that they bring down the overall average.

=== Economic growth ===
Corruption remains one of the key factors reflecting poverty levels throughout the world, and these states generally fare worse in the corruption indexes that are published.

It is one of the enigmas that in spite of the large representation in the Indian Parliament, the states cannot get adequate resources for their development.

== See also ==
- Indo-Gangetic Plain
- Standard of living in India
- List of Indian states and union territories by GDP
- List of Indian states and union territories by Human Development Index
- Ministry of Rural Development (India)
- Rural Development Foundation, India
- Economy of India
- Green Revolution in India
