= Ballekere Halt railway station =

Railway station in Karnataka

Ballekere Halt

General information
- Location: National Highway 206, Ballekere, Chikmagalur district, Karnatak; India
- Coordinates: 13°30′08″N 76°01′25″E
- Elevation: 780 metres (2,560 ft)
- System: Indian Railways station
- Owner: Indian Railways
- Operator: South Western Railway
- Line: Bangalore–Arsikere–Hubli line
- Platforms: 2
- Tracks: Double Electric-Line

Construction
- Structure type: Standard (on ground)

Other information
- Status: Functioning
- Station code: BLKR
- Zone(s): South Western Railway
- Division(s): Mysore

Services
Preceding station	Indian Railways	Following station
Devanur towards ?	South Western Railway zone Bangalore–Arsikere–Hubli line	Kadur Junction towards ?
Location
- Interactive map

Ballekere Halt railway station is a halt railway station located on the Bangalore–Arsikere–Hubli railway line operated by the South Western Railway zone under Mysore railway division. It is situated beside National Highway 206 at Ballekere in Chikmagalur district in the Indian state of Karnataka.
