= Dorairaj =

Dorairaj is a name. People with the name include:

- Dorairaj Prabhakaran
- S. M. Dorairaj
- Nandaa Dorairaj
