= B.S. Raja Iyengar =

Sangeetha Vidwan B.S. Raja Iyengar
- Born: 1901; Banavar,Kingdom of Mysore (now in Hassan district, Karnataka, India)
- Died: 1978 (aged 76–77)
- Genre: Carnatic music
- Occupations: Vocalist; Actor
- Years active: 1920s–1970s

B.S. Raja Iyengar (1901 - 1978) was a carnatic vocalist who also served as Court Musician at Mysore Kingdom.

== Personal life ==
B.S. Raja Iyengar was born in 1901 in Banavar, Karnataka.

== Career ==
B.S. Raja Iyengar studied the carnatic music with Bidara Krishnappa, K. Vasudeva and K. V. Sreenivasa Iyengar. He was known for his renditions of ragas, padams as well as devotional songs. He also sang many Kannada stage songs. He was a court Musician at Mysore. He was also the president of the first Karnataka Ganakala Parishat held in 1970.

== Awards ==
- 1965: Received Mysore State - Sangeet Nataka Akademy award.
- 1973: Awarded Sangeet Natak Akademi Award in the field of Music for his contribution to carnatic Vocal Music.
