= Banavar railway station =

Railway station in Karnataka

Banavar

General information
- Location: Bagilaghatta, Banavara, Hassan district, Karnatak; India
- Coordinates: 13°23′45″N 76°08′24″E
- Elevation: 789 metres (2,589 ft)
- System: Indian Railways station
- Owner: Indian Railways
- Operator: South Western Railway
- Line: Bangalore–Arsikere–Hubli line
- Platforms: 2
- Tracks: Double Electric-Line

Construction
- Structure type: Standard (on ground)

Other information
- Status: Functioning
- Station code: BVR
- Zone(s): South Western Railway
- Division(s): Mysore

Services
Preceding station	Indian Railways	Following station
Arsikere Junction towards ?	South Western Railway zone Bangalore–Arsikere–Hubli line	Devanur towards ?
Location
- Interactive map

Banavar railway station is a railway station located on the Bangalore–Arsikere–Hubli railway line operated by the South Western Railway zone under Mysore railway division. It is situated at Bagilaghatta, Banavara in Hassan district in the Indian state of Karnataka.
