= Devanur railway station =

Railway station in Karnataka

Devanur

General information
- Location: Devanur, Chikmagalur district, Karnatak; India
- Coordinates: 13°26′21″N 76°05′18″E
- Elevation: 754 metres (2,474 ft)
- System: Indian Railways station
- Owner: Indian Railways
- Operator: South Western Railway
- Line: Bangalore–Arsikere–Hubli line
- Platforms: 2
- Tracks: Double Electric-Line

Construction
- Structure type: Standard (on ground)

Other information
- Status: Functioning
- Station code: VNR
- Zone(s): South Western Railway
- Division(s): Mysore

Services
Preceding station	Indian Railways	Following station
Banavar towards ?	South Western Railway zone Bangalore–Arsikere–Hubli line	Ballekere Halt towards ?
Location
- Interactive map

Devanur railway station is a railway station located on the Bangalore–Arsikere–Hubli railway line operated by the South Western Railway zone under Mysore railway division. It is situated at Devanur in Chikmagalur district in the Indian state of Karnataka.
