= T. N. Madan =

Indian sociologist (born 1933)

Triloki Nath Madan
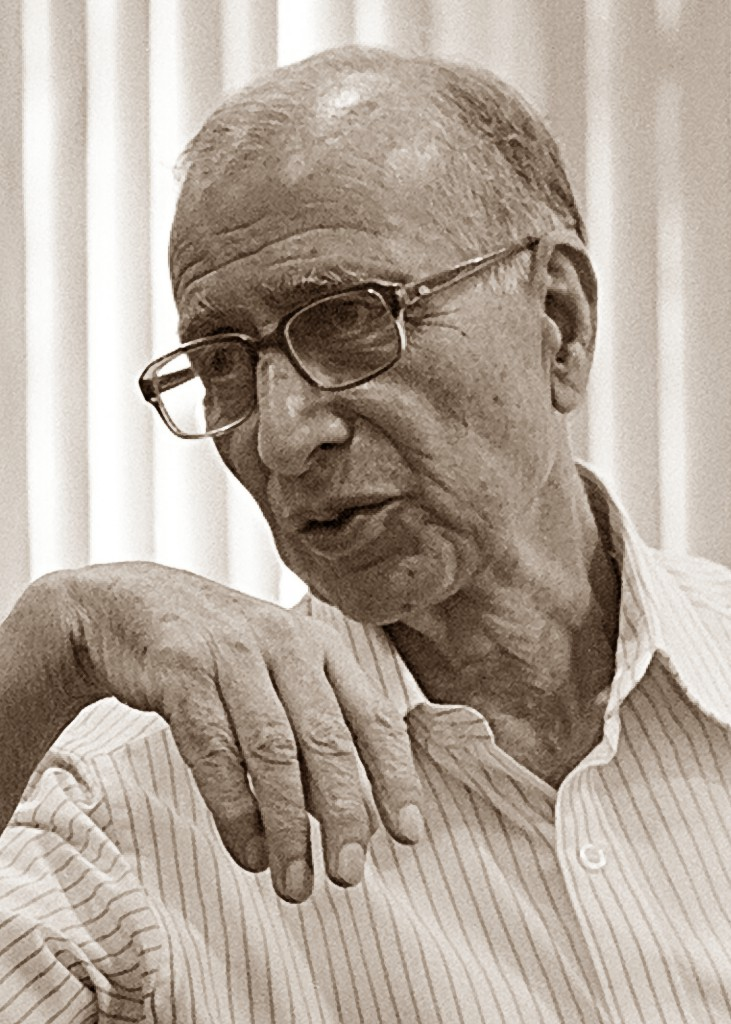
- Madan in 2014
- Born: Triloki Nath Madan; 12 August 1933 (age 93); Srinagar, Jammu and Kashmir, British India

Triloki Nath Madan (born 12 August 1933, in Kashmir, India) is an anthropologist, with a Ph.D from the Australian National University (1960). He is currently Professor Emeritus of Sociology at the Institute of Economic Growth, Delhi University, and Distinguished Senior Fellow (Adjunct), Centre for the Study of Developing Societies, Delhi. Of the teaching positions he held earlier, those at Lucknow and Dharwar lasted longest. He taught for short periods at several universities in India and abroad.

== Biography ==
Haksar was born on August 12, 1933 into a Kashmiri Pandit family in the Downtown neighborhood of Srinagar, in the Kashmir Valley of the erstwhile princely state of Jammu and Kashmir, within British India.

He was elected a Fellow of the Royal Anthropological Institute of Great Britain and Ireland in 1989. In 1994, he was made Docteur Honoris Causa by the University of Paris X (Nanterre). In 1995, he occupied the Sarvepalli Radhakrishnan Chair in Humanities and Social Sciences at the University of Hyderabad. He has held visiting appointments at a number of universities including Harvard where he was Visiting Professor of Anthropology and of the History of Religion in 1984-85.

His most noted work is Family and Kinship among the Pandits of Rural Kashmir (1966, 1989) which presented an account of the social life of Kashmiri Pandits. His more recent publications include,"Modern Myths, Locked Minds: Secularism and Fundamentalism in India" (1997, 2009), "Images of the World: Essays on Religion, Secularism, and Culture" (2005), and "Sociological Traditions: Methods and Perspectives in the Sociology of India" (2011).

He was presented with a Festschrift titled Tradition, Pluralism and Identity: In Honour of T.N. Madan, edited by Veena Das, Dipankar Gupta and Patricia Uberoi. Currently he lives in Delhi.

He was married to Uma Chaturvedi, a non-Kashmiri. She died in December 2013. They have two children.

== Awards ==
The Indian Sociological Society gave him the Lifetime Achievement Award in 2008.
