= National Highway 206 (India, old numbering) =

Old numbering of road in India

National Highway 365

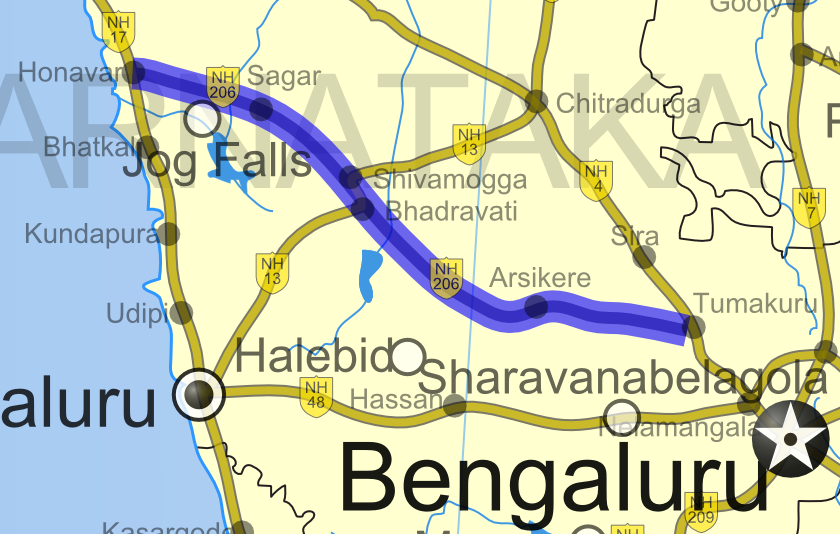
- NH-206 highlighted in blue

Route information
- Length: 650 km (400 mi)

Major junctions
- From: Tumkur
- Via: Kadur, Shivamogga
- To: Honnavar

Location
- Country: India
- States: Karnataka
- Primary destinations: Tiptur- Arsikere- Banavara- Kadur- Shivamogga- Sagara- Jog Falls- Honnavar.

Highway system
- Roads in India; Expressways; National; State; Asian
← NH 205	→ NH 207

National Highway 206 (NH 206) was a National Highway in India within the state of Karnataka. NH 206 connected the towns of Tumkur and Honnavar, Via: Tiptur, Arsikere, Kadur, Shivamogga and it was 365 km long.

Before it was upgraded to a National Highway, the NH 206 was designated as State Highway 68 (SH 68), and alternatively known as B.H. Road (Bangalore-Honnavar Road). At Honnavar, it started at the junction with NH 17 (Old Number) and crossed NH 13 (Old Number) before joining the former NH 4 near Sira. (NH4 has now been renumbered as NH48).

All the National Highways were renumbered in the year 2010. Banavara to Honnavar sector of this highway is presently merged under new number NH 69 and Banavara to Tumkur sector is a part of new Highway number NH 73.

== Route ==
- Tumkur,
- Gubbi,
- Tiptur,
- Arsikere,
- Banavara,
- Kadur,
- Birur,
- Tarikere,
- Bhadravathi
- Shivamogga,
- Sagara,
- Jog Falls,
- Honnavar

== See also ==
- List of national highways in India
- National Highways Development Project
