= Institute of Economic Growth =

Indian economic research institute

- Established: 1952; 74 years ago
- President: N. K. Singh
- Chair: Dr. Michael Debabrata Patra
- Location: Delhi University Enclave, New Delhi, Delhi, India
- Interactive map of Institute of Economic Growth
- Website: www.iegindia.org

The Institute of Economic Growth (IEG) is an autonomous, multidisciplinary Centre for advanced research and training. Established in 1958, its faculty of about 23 social scientists (economists, demographers and sociologists) and a large body of supporting research staff focus on areas of social and policy concern.

IEG's research falls into nine broad themes: Agriculture and rural development, environment and resource economics; globalization and trade; industry, labour and welfare; macro-economic policy and modeling; population and development; health policy; and social change and social structure. In addition, the Institute organizes regular training programmes for the trainee officers of the Indian Economic Service and occasional courses for officers of the Indian Statistical Service, NABARD, and university teachers. The Institute's faculty members also supervise doctoral students from India and abroad, provide regular policy inputs, and engage with government, civil society and international organisations. Over the years IEG has hosted many international scholars, including Nobel Laureates Elinor Ostrom and Amartya Sen, and others such as Ronald Dore, Yujiro Hayami, Jan Breman and Nicolas Stern.

Founded in 1958 by the economist V.K.R.V. Rao, IEG's faculty, Board of Directors and Trustees have included a wide range of distinguished intellectuals and policy makers, including V.T. Krishnamachari, C.D. Deshmukh, P.N. Dhar, A.M. Khusro, Dharm Narain, C. Rangarajan, C.H. Hanumantha Rao, Nitin Desai, T.N. Madan, P.C. Joshi and Bimal Jalan. Several former faculty members have served as members of the Planning Commission or on the Prime Minister's Panel of Economic Advisors. Former Prime Minister Manmohan Singh has had a long association with the Institute, initially as Chairman of the Board (1972-1982) and as President (1992-2021) of the IEG Society. Other notable faculty members and leaders have included Ashish Bose and P. B. Desai. Currently, Shri. N.K. Singh is the President of IEG, Dr. Michael Debabrata Patra is the Chairman of the BoG, IEG and Prof. Sabyasachi Kar is the Director of IEG.

The institute's areas of research may be broadly classified into nine themes:

- Agricultural and Rural Development
- Environmental and Natural Resources
- Globalization and Trade
- Health Economics and Policy
- Industry and Development
- Employment, Labour and Informal Sector
- Macroeconomics Analysis and Policy
- Population and Human Resources
- Social Change and Social Structure

The institute also imparts training to the trainee officers of the Indian Economic Service, the Indian Statistical Service, NABARD, and university faculty. It also conducts talks, dissertations and seminars and has hosted scholars such as Nobel Laureates Elinor Ostrom and Amartya Sen, Ronald Dore, Yujiro Hayami, Jan Breman and Nicolas Stern.

== Facilities ==
=== Campus ===
IEG campus is a sprawling one, covering 7.5 acres of land and is home to the main office building, library, and residential buildings. The campus also accommodates a fitness centre, outdoor and indoor recreational facilities, seminar hall, children's park and play area for kids.

=== Library ===
IEG maintains a library, stocked with 1,31,000 accessioned documents such as books, monographs, workshop papers, proceedings of conferences, statistical documents in the fields of economics, economic development, energy, environment, finance, econometrics, mathematics, agriculture, forestry, industry, irrigation, sociology, social anthropology, gender, demography and health. It also has a wide range of unaccessioned micro documents on the subjects. It is accessible to research scholars, trainee officers and students of Delhi School of Economics and University of Delhi.

The library maintains around 20,000 bound volumes of journals and subscribes to 104 paid journals, 51 exchange journals and 123 gratis journals. Another specialized collection of the library is census reports; the complete set of census reports are available in hard copy or microfilms or CD format.

=== Computer Centre ===
The Computer Centre in IEG is the controlling and service providing centre of the Institute in all matters related to information technology. The centre oversees the functioning of the IEG communication network with the help of advanced servers, LAN network, data repository, fast internet connection through Delhi University LAN, wi-fi systems and reprographic facilities that can accommodate 170 users at a time. The systems are supported by relevant office automation software.

=== Hostel ===
The Institute provides hostel facility to the trainees, probationers, officers of the Indian Economic Service, the Indian Audits and Accounts Service and others undergoing training at the institute. The facility is also available to the research staff working on various IEG projects, doctoral or post-doctoral students and guests, on an availability basis.

== Research themes ==
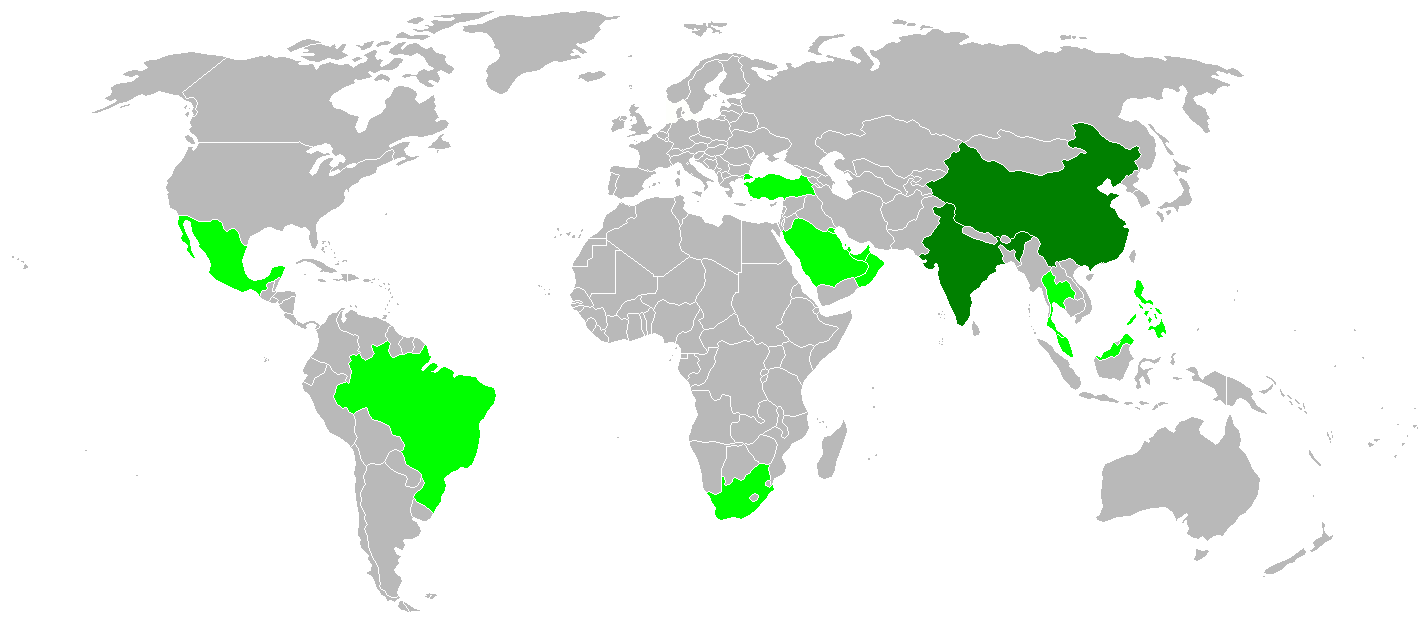
The countries in green are considered to be newly industrialising nations. China and India (in dark green) are special cases.

The effect of Industrialisation shown by rising income levels since 1800. The graph shows the gross national product (at purchasing power parity) per capita between 1750 and 1900 in 1960 US dollars for First World nations (Europe, United States, Canada, Japan) and Third World nations (Asia, Africa, Latin America).

Percent urban population of a country living in slums. (Source: UN Habitat 2005) 10-20% 20-30% 30-40% 40-50% 50-60% 60-70% 70-80% 80-90% 90-100% No data

=== Agricultural and rural development ===
Agriculture and rural development was a high priority theme with IEG since in inception. The projects under this theme are funder by the Ministry of Agriculture, Government of India. The efforts are focused on sustainable agricultural development with special attention on environmental economics. The studies revolve around the pattern of growth in agriculture, its sources, determinants and implications in the society and the non farm employment in rural and urban India. The researches have produced several books, journals and research papers which are available for reference with IEG library.

=== Environmental and natural resources ===
The theme was introduced for research in the Eighties and has gained importance over the time. Research activities on non-renewable resources such as coal, iron ore, petroleum and oil, irrigation and water management, solar, biogas and renewable energy technologies have gained momentum at the institute. Simultaneously, forest related issues and industrial pollution are also treated as high priority subjects.

=== Globalization and trade ===
The principal are of work under this theme was transfer of technology and multinational enterprises which has now been expanded to cover trade and emerging issues of World Trade Organization (WTO) as well. The issues emerged as a fallout of globalization such as social and economic impact and cross-border trade have also been included now for further study.

=== Health economics and policy ===
The theme focusses on areas of health economics in the evolving national scene and is aimed at assisting policy makers with valid research data for arriving at policies and its amendments from time to time.

=== Industry and development ===
The theme of Industry and development was a major one, introduced at the beginning of the Institute and covered the entire range from small industry to multinational corporations with emphasis on employment, efficiency, environment and information technology. The emphasis is on contemporary issues from a policy making perspective. Small scale industries, petroleum, cotton and jute textiles, pricing policy for cement, sugar and cotton, location of sugar and fertilizer factories, and wages and productivity in major industries have all been taken up for advanced research and resultant studies have been made available to policy makers during the past years.

=== Employment, labour and informal sector ===
The latest addition to the theme profile is the one related to employment, labour and informal sector. IEG has conducted a large number of researches on:

- labour market, employment, unemployment, underemployment and low productivity employment in the informal sector
- standard of living and poverty
- social capital, population and income mobility
- urban slums, basic amenities and housing
- urban development

=== Macroeconomic analysis and policy ===
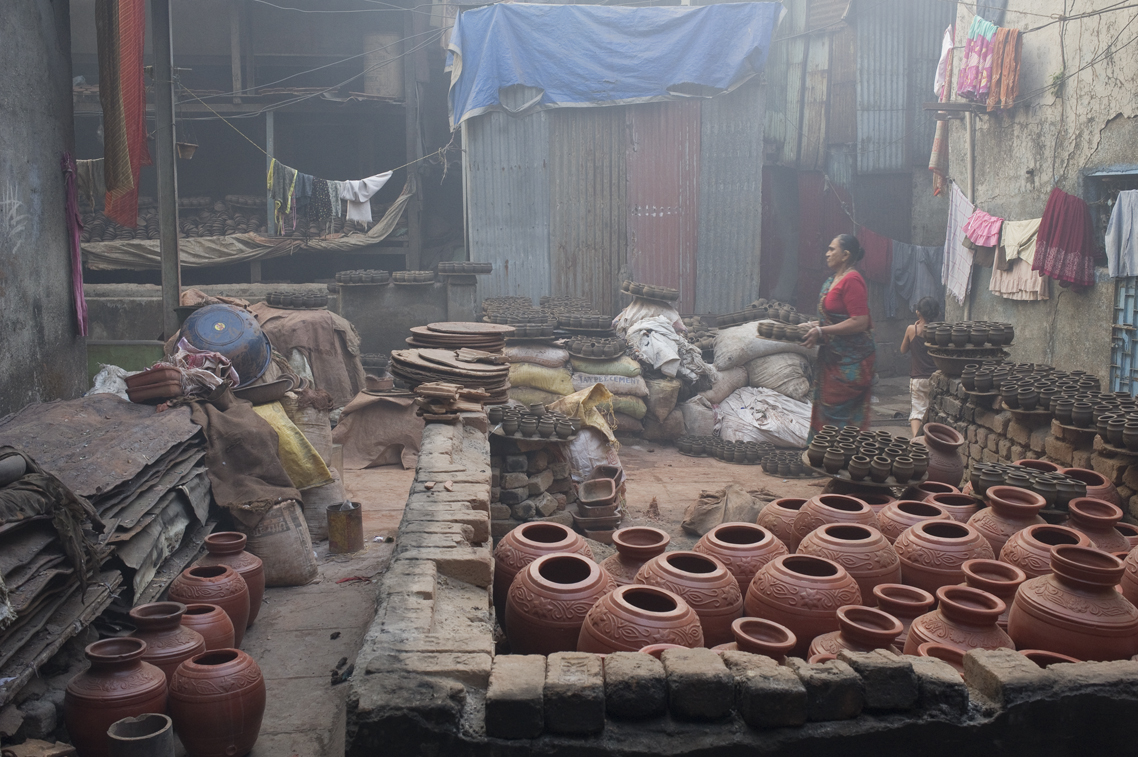
An integrated slum dwelling and informal economy inside Dharavi of Mumbai. Dharavi slum started in 1887 with industrial and segregationist policies of the British colonial era. The slum housing, tanneries, pottery and other economy established inside and around Dharavi during the British rule of India.

The theme is a preferred one at IEG and attends to the macroeconomic issues related to India and other developing countries and strive to develop macro economic models suitable for India. The researches are supported by the Development Planning Centre (DPC) and the Reserve Bank of India (RBI) Endowment Unit.

=== Population and human resources ===
The theme was introduced by the founder of IEG, V. K. R. V. Rao, in 1972. The studies undertaken under this theme are related to qualitative and quantitative evaluation of population and the development of demographic techniques for the estimation of births, deaths, contraception, couple protection and women's issues. It also studies the impact of national policies such as National Population Policy, National Health Policy, National Policy on Older persons and policies envisaged under the National Rural Health Mission on the society.

=== Social change and social structure ===
The theme of Social change and social structure, or in broader terms, sociology, was introduced by the Asian Centre of UNESCO, which was later merged with IEG, in 1967. The main areas of research are:

- comparative study of cultural and political development
- communalism and ethnic conflict
- rural transformation
- sociology of popular culture
- emergence of professionals and other middle class elites
- dynamics of religion, secularism and modernization
- changing functions of social institutions such as the family
- contemporary media networks
- gender relations
- social policy in respect to education, urbanisation and health
- cultural patronage
- social ecology and environment

Contributions to Indian Sociology, a journal, is based at IEG and is published in association with SAGE Publications.

== Research units ==
Agricultural economics unit: The unit was established in 1961 with the aid of the Ministry of Agriculture to undertake studies on the various aspects of Indian agriculture.

Development planning centre: Established in 1994 with the financial support in the form of an endowment, from the Planning Commission, the unit endeavours to develop macro-economic models for forecasting the changes to assist the Government of India in policy making. The unit has collaboration arrangement with the Central Planning Bureau of Netherlands and Erasmus University.

Environment and resource economics unit: This unit was formed in 1998, funded by World Bank, and channeled through the Ministry of Environment and Forests under a five-year program. Later, Ford Foundation provided an endowment grant to IEG for creating a Professorial Chair in Environmental and Resource Economics. The unit concentrates on research, training, advising and networking the area of environment and resource economics.

Health policy research unit: The main objectives of the unit was to broaden the spectrum of research in the field of health economics. It was established in 1998 and strives to carry out research on:

- Health and poverty
- Health issues of the elderly, adolescents and women
- Health financing
- Health insurance
- Economic Impact of HIV/AIDS, Cardiovascular Diseases
- Coordination with agencies like WTO and GATS
- Adoption of health technology
- Costing and cost-effectiveness of health interventions.
- Economics of tobacco consumption and illegal drugs

The activities of the unit are funded by Ministry of Health and Family Welfare; World Bank, WHO, UNAIDS, UNDP, DFID, AUSAID, SIDA, the Population Council, the International AIDS Vaccine Initiative (IAVI), Center for Global Development (CGD), Centre for Chronic Disease Control and Ford Foundation.

IES training section: IES training section was started in 1968 with the principal aim of training the officers of the Indian Economic Service. IEG conducts two types of officer training programs; an induction training program for probationers of IES and the other, an in-service course for regular officers. The courses originally covered topics such as problems related to Indian economy, Economic Sociology and Institutional Aspects of Economic Development, but the course was redesigned in 2005 to include microeconomics, macroeconomics, public economics and quantitative techniques based on case studies. A brain storming section is also a part of the course.

Population research centre: PRC was established in 1957 as a constituent of Delhi School of Economics, on the advice of V. K. R. V. Rao, who along with Professor P. C. Mahalanobis and Professor D. R. Gadgil, were members of a committee to study the development of research on population and its socio-economic impact. As per the recommendations of the committee, four Demographic Research Centres were opened of which one was hosted by IEG. This centre, in 1972, was renamed as Population Research Centre. The centre focusses mainly on policy issues and planning programs.

RBI endowment unit: The Reserve Bank of India granted a temporary endowment to IEG in 1979 to conduct studies on topics that is of interest to RBI such as money, trade, income and employment. The system was made permanent by RBI in 1991. The unit undertakes advanced research on matters related macroeconomics, open economy macroeconomic issues and economic reforms with special emphasis on applied econometric and causality analysis.

Social change and social structure unit: The unit is an eventual evolvement of the Asian Region Centre of UNESCO which started functioning out of IEG in 1967. When UNESCO opted out of the cooperation, the centre was downsized to form the unit, in 1974. The unit is funded by the Indian Council of Social Science Research (ICSSR).

VKRV Rao centre for studies in globalization: The unit was started in 1993 with the assistance from Ford Foundation for undertaking studies on globalization, the findings of which have been brought out by IEG by way of 4 books and over 50 research papers, published in known publications such as The Journal of Development Studies, World Development, Journal of Development Economics, Developing Economies, Applied Economics, Applied Economics Letters, The Journal of International Trade and Economic Development, International Business Review, Journal of Business Venturing, Transnational Corporations, World Competition, Research Policy, The Information Society, Information Economics and Policy, Science Technology & Development, Indian Economic Review, and Economic and Political Weekly. Presently, the unit is involved in projects under two major themes; Information Technology (IT) Software and Hardware and Role of Knowledge Sharing in the Globalization of Indian Enterprises. The centre is also conducting collaborative research with Georgetown University, Washington DC, USA, Institute of Developing Economies, Tokyo, Japan; Erasmus University Rotterdam, The Netherlands; United Nations University INTECH, Maastricht, The Netherlands and University of Toronto, Toronto, Canada.

== Publications ==
The institute has published many books, some of the notable ones published since 2010 are:

- T.A. Bhavani; Prof. N.R. Bhanumurthy (2012). Financial Access in Post-Reform India. Oxford University Press. ISBN 978-0-19-807665-0.
- T.A. Bhavani (2012). Understanding Reforms: Post 1991 India – An Update. Oxford University Press. ISBN 978-0-19-808558-4.
- Madan, T.N. (2010). Sociological Tradition: Methods and Perspectives in the Sociology of India. Sage Publication. ISBN 9788132105756.
- Agrawal, Pradeep (2010). India's Economy and Growth: Essays in Honour of VKRV Rao. Sage Publication. ISBN 9788132104520.
- Srivastava, Sanjay (2010). Sexuality Studies. Oxford University Press. ISBN 978-0-19-808557-7.
- Gulati, S.C. (2010). Population, Health and Human Resources in India's Development. Academic Foundation: Delhi. ISBN 9788171887859.
- Agarwal, Bina (2010). Gender and Green Governance: The Political Economy of Women's Presence Within and Beyond Community Forestry. Oxford University Press. ISBN 978-0-19-956968-7.
- Alam, Moneer, Armando Barrientos (2010). Demographics, Employment and Old Age Security: Emerging Trends and Challenges for South Asia. Macmillan: India. ISBN 9780230331679. Archived from the original on 2014-07-14.

IEG has also published many other books and research papers.

== See also ==
- Division of labour
- Deindustrialisation
- Great Divergence
- Newly industrialised country
- Urbanisation
- Idea of Progress
