= Karnataka Ganakala Parishat =

Music conference

Karnataka Ganakala Parishat (also Ganakala Parishath) is an annual conference of Carnatic music held in February. The first conference was conducted in the year 1970 under the presidency of Vidwan B.S. Raja Iyengar. Over a period of several days (16 days in 2020), lecture demonstrations are given in the mornings, and four musical performances are given every afternoon and evening. The conference confers the title of "Ganakalabhushana" every year on a veteran musician, and "Ganakalashree" on a young musician.

Since 2004, the conference has been presided over by Vidwan R.K. Padmanabha, who has sought to hold the conference in a variety of locations, including Ramanathapuram, Nanjangud, Holenarasipura, Tumkur, Gadag, Bijapur, and Belur.
