= Ashish Bose =

Indian demographer

Ashish Bose (12 July 1930 – 7 April 2014) was a prominent Indian demographer and economic analyst. He was Honorary (Emeritus) Professor at the Institute of Economic Growth in New Delhi, where he headed the Population Research Centre for several years. He is credited with coining the term BIMARU for Bihar, Madhya Pradesh, Rajasthan and Uttar Pradesh collectively.

Through his long academic career, he lectured extensively on demography across the world, and taught at New Delhi's Jawaharlal Nehru University, the National Academy of Administration, Mussoorie and the National Defence College, New Delhi.

A member of several government commissions on population and development issues, Bose was a keen participant in international conferences on these issues in India and abroad. He was advisor on demographic and census issues to various Indian prime ministers starting with Rajiv Gandhi. The author and editor of 25 books, he was a regular contributor to the Economic and Political Weekly, Health for the Millions and Power Politics.

== Death ==
Bose died in New Delhi on 7 April 2014 from complications after hip-replacement surgery following a fall.
