= Shyam Prabhakaran =

American vascular neurologist

- Born: New Jersey, USA

Academic background
- Education: BA, Boston University; MD, 2000, New Jersey Medical School; MS, epidemiology, 2006, Columbia University

Academic work
- Institutions: University of Chicago; Northwestern University Feinberg School of Medicine; Rush University Medical Center

Shyam K. Prabhakaran is an American vascular neurologist. He is the James Nelson and Anna Louise Raymond Professor and Chair of the Department of Neurology at the University of Chicago.

== Early life and education ==
Prabhakaran grew up in New Jersey. He completed his undergraduate degree at Boston University and qualified for the Dean's list in 1996. Prabhakaran then earned his medical degree at New Jersey Medical School and completed his internship and residnecy at NewYork-Presbyterian Hospital. He also earned his Master of Science degree at Columbia University.

== Career ==
Prabhakaran moved to Chicago in 2006 and accepted a research position at Rush University Medical Center. As a neurologist at Rush, Prabhakaran focused on stroke prevention and treatment. In this role, he helped identify three bedside clinical features to assist physicians in accurately diagnosing transient ischemic attacks from disorders that might mimic their symptoms. He eventually left Rush to become a neurologist at Northwestern Memorial Hospital and an associate professor of neurology at the Northwestern University Feinberg School of Medicine. At Northwestern, Prabhakaran became the principal investigator for the National Institutes of Health's (NIH) Chicago Stroke Trials Consortium to support clinical trials for stroke prevention, treatment and recovery. In this role, he helped influence public policy change in Chicago in regards to emergency care in Chicago's stroke centers. His research team published findings that found that suspected stroke patients had a higher chance of survival if they were transported to the nearest primary stroke center instead of the nearest emergency room.

Prabhakaran left Northwestern on February 1, 2019, to become the professor and chair of the University of Chicago's Department of Neurology. As a professor in the Pritzker School of Medicine, Prabhakaran helped the college become the only official NIH networking site researching stroke and dementia in Chicago. He was later appointed the James Nelson and Anna Louise Raymond Professor in the Department of Neurology.
