= Honnavalli =

- village
- Location in Karnataka, India Honnavalli (India)
- Coordinates: 13.34°N 76.39°E
- Country: India
- State: Karnataka
- District: Tiptur

Government
  - Type: Panchayati raj (India)
  - Body: Gram panchayat

Languages
  - Official: Kannada
- Time zone: UTC+5:30 (IST)
- PIN: 572217
- ISO 3166 code: IN-KA
- Nearest city: Tiptur

Honnavalli is an Indian village in Tiptur Taluk in Karnataka State. It has an average elevation of 820 metres (2693 feet).

== History ==
Honnavalli is a village headquarters about 10 miles northwest of Tiptur in Tumkur District. Honnavalli was the Taluk headquarters until 1889. The history of the village dates back to the eleventh century. It was built by one Someswararaya who belonged to the Harnahalli Nayak family. Legend says 'Honnu Amma' the family deity of the Palegar appeared in his dream and directed him to build a model village in her name. Even today 'Honnavalli Amma' is the Village Goddess.
