= Institute for Social and Economic Change =

Indian think tank and research institute

The Institute for Social and Economic Change (ISEC) is a social science research institute in Bangalore, India. Founded in 1972, it is the largest among the 27 institutions supported by Indian Council of Social Science Research (ICSSR).

ISEC is one of three major institutions established by Prof. V. K. R. V. Rao, along with the Delhi School of Economics and the Institute of Economic Growth, Delhi.

== Institute for Social and Economic Change ==
(ISEC) multi-disciplinary social science research institute established by Prof. V.K.R.V Rao in 1972, funded by the Indian Council of Social Science Research (ICSSR) and the Government of Karnataka. The thrust of the institute is to integrate the social science research skills in initiating, complementing, participating and furthering the social, economic and political changes of the societies with an emphasis on equity and justice. Prof. Rao’s vision was to build purposeful interactions within social science disciplines as well as with other life science streams to create a strong interdisciplinary work. ISEC’s concern for the social and economic welfare of the poor and disadvantaged groups reflects strongly in the large number of studies it has undertaken to understand the various dimensions of poverty and human development. Analytical and applied research studies particularly in policy-related areas have also been areas of priority at ISEC. Central, state and local level governments have come to rely on the Institute for evaluation of various policies and programmes.

ISEC has also developed some research linkages. In order to promote core-funded activities at ISEC, Prof Rao got the support of the Union Ministry of Agriculture to house one of its three agro-economic research units i.e. the Agricultural Development and Rural Transformation (ADRT) at the Institute (the other two are housed at the Institute of Economic Growth, Delhi, and the Indian Institute of Management, Ahmedabad). The Ministry of Health and Family Welfare has also established the Population Research Centre (PRC) at ISEC.

ISEC is the biggest research Institute amongst ICSSR sponsored interdisciplinary research institutions. The research and academic activities of the institute are structured under eight centers covering the areas ranging from economics, ecological economics, agricultural economics, population research, sociology, health, education, political science, public administration, decentralization and rural development. The research under the centres is collectively discussed and monitored through statutory bodies.

ISEC has a faculty of forty five from different areas of social and life sciences. Some of the collaborations are with: NORDIC Centre, Netherlands, Maastricht University, World Bank, Asian Development Bank, UNFPA, UNDP, USAID, European Commission, the Swedish C-Dot, DANIDA and Ford Foundation. In the honor of Dr.V K R V Rao, ISEC has instituted a visiting chair, presently held by Prof. Ashutosh Varshney, Professor of Political Science at Brown University. ISEC has a programme for training social science students for their PhD. The students are taken for the course from an open advertisement and after a rigorous scrutiny of about 12 out of 300 applicants the students are undergo training for one year. ISEC provides fellowships to the students and up till now about 200 students have obtained their PhD in Social Sciences through ISEC. ISEC has infrastructure that includes a library, data bank, digital sources of information, seminar halls, auditorium, students’ hostel, residential accommodation and guest house.

It is recognized that policy-making in India requires systematizing and active lobbying of scholarship. Aware of practical difficulties in connecting research to policy, ISEC from the very beginning has established itself as a credible and accountable institution to provide policy feedback to the Government of India and the state governments. In addition, ISEC has regularly contributed and assisted central, state and local governments by providing advice on important issues.

== Data bank ==
ISEC has set up a data bank for storing both secondary and primary data collected for several projects. It has also gathered and stored basic NSS and census data and other secondary data from World Bank, RBI, etc., as well as data on the Indian economy, polity and society and classified them in a user-friendly manner. Staffed by a data bank manager, there are plans to index the data available in the bank for easier use. All these will be put on the network and the entire work will be taken up in a time bound manner to make it available to ISEC users.

== Infrastructure ==
The ISEC campus is located in Nagarbhavi Village, Bangalore on the south-western outskirts of the city. Set amidst 16 hectares, it abuts the Bangalore University’s Jnanabharati premises. The campus has an academic and administrative complex, student hostels, a guesthouse for visiting scholars, residential facilities for 77 faculty members and staff, four seminar halls, two committee rooms, and a 300-seater auditorium.

== V.K.R.V. Rao Library ==
The V.K.R.V. Rao Library at ISEC has a collection of two lakh titles, 400 microfiche copies of periodicals, official and non-official documents and back volumes of professional journals and periodicals. ISEC also subscribes to about 350 professional foreign and Indian journals, and nine newspapers.

Using a grant from Government of Karnataka ISEC has started a digital library and a large number of rare books and reports in social sciences have been digitised. Additionally, some books published by ISEC students and other ISEC publications have been digitised and all of these are available online to users. ISEC has entered into agreements with Mythic Society, Mysore University and Gokhale Institute of Politics and Economics to take ahead the process of digitisation.

== Specialization ==
Research activities are conducted under the various centres, which also match the thematic research areas and the requirements of the funding agencies. The various centres are:

- Agricultural Development and Rural Transformation Centre
- Centre for Decentralisation and Development
- Centre for Economic Studies and Policy
- Centre for Human Resource Development
- Centre for Political Institutions, Governance and Development
- Centre for Ecological Economics and Natural Resources
- Population Research Centre
- Centre for Study of Social Change and Development

The larger impact of ISEC has been through dissemination of the results of its research studies. In the past 38 years of its existence, the Institute has completed studies on wide-ranging topics in social sciences. The papers and publications have been shared widely with other social science research institutions and are well received by scholars in social sciences and policy makers alike. This includes 650 applied and policy-related studies on various economic, social, political and administrative issues, 225 books, and over 2,500 technical articles published by the faculty. Of these, over 1100 articles were published in refereed journals in India and abroad, 400 articles in various magazines and about 1,000 articles in various media. ISEC faculty members have made their presence felt in many national and international seminars, conferences and workshops. Regular contributions by ISEC faculty and students appear in leading newspapers to raise the standard of public debate and influence public opinion on several contemporary issues. 225 working papers and 20 monographs by the faculty have been published.

== Current Acting Director ==
Prof. Parmod Kumar

== See also ==
- List of think tanks in India
