= Centre for Chronic Disease Control =

Research Institute

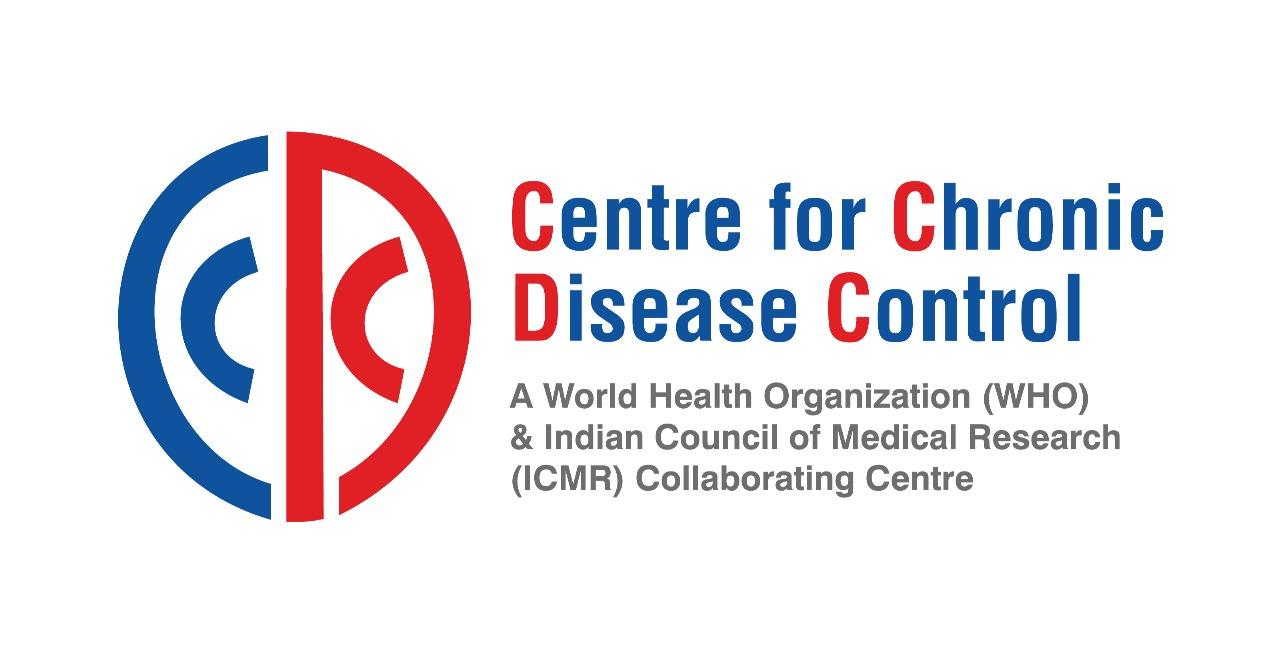
- Founded: 2000; 26 years ago
- Headquarters: India
- Key people: Prof. D. Prabhakaran (Executive Director)
- Website: https://ccdcindia.org/

Centre for Chronic Disease Control (CCDC) is a non-profit organization recognized by the Government of India, established in 2000, working to reduce the burden of chronic diseases in India and low- and middle-income countries. It is a World Health Organization Collaborating Centre for surveillance, capacity building, and translational research in cardio-metabolic diseases and an Indian Council of Medical Research collaborating centre for excellence in recognition of commendable achievements in biomedical research.

== Collaborations ==
CCDC has collaborated with many national and international organizations, some of them are as follows:

- World Health Organization
- All India Institutes of Medical Sciences
- Indian Council for Medical Research
- Harvard T.H. Chan School of Public Health
- London School of Hygiene & Tropical Medicine
- Imperial College, London
- Emory University
- India Health Fund
- Ashoka University

== Work and Impact ==
CCDC has conducted over 100 research projects, 15 clinical trials, published more than 1000 works, and impacted over 1 million people. It has trained a vast range of specialists over the years. CCDC has been actively identifying and developing innovative solutions to ensure equity in digital healthcare. It is improving the quality and access to specialist healthcare for marginalized populations living in remote areas, employing innovative digital solutions. It is improving the quality and access to specialist healthcare for marginalized populations living in remote areas, employing innovative digital solutions.

== Awards and Achievements ==
- Awarded Grant from Indian Council for Medical Research to establish Centre For Advanced Research.
- Commendable Faculty Award to Prof. D. Prabhakaran (Executive Director CCDC) by Career 360.
- Claude Lenfant Excellence Award to Prof. D. Prabhakaran (Executive Director CCDC) by the World Hypertension League.
- Recognised as a Scientific and Industrial Research Organization by the Department of Scientific and Industrial Research
- Recognised as a Centre of Excellence in Clinical Research by the Clinical Development Service Agency, Department of Biotechnology, Government of India

== Notable people ==
- Dorairaj Prabhakaran, scientist, cardiologist, author, researcher and Executive Director of CCDC
