= Kanagale =

Village in Karnataka, India

- Village
- Location in Karnataka, India Kanagale (India)
- Coordinates: 16.29°N 74.60°E
- Country: India
- State: Karnataka
- District: Belgaum
- Talukas: Hukeri

Population (2001)
  - Total: 7,254

Languages
  - Official: Kannada
- Time zone: UTC+5:30 (IST)

Kanagale is a village in the southern state of Karnataka, India. It is located in the Hukeri taluk of Belgaum district in Karnataka.

== Demographics ==
As of 2001 India census, Kanagale had a population of 7254 with 3714 males and 3540 females.

== See also ==
- Belgaum
- Districts of Karnataka
