= Ballecer =

Ballecer is a Filipino surname. Notable people with the surname include:

- Robert Ballecer (born 1974), American technology commentator
- Sud Ballecer (fl. 2011), Filipino musician, member of the band Sud
