= Banavara =

- Town
- Location in Karnataka, India Banavara (India)
- Coordinates: 13°25′N 76°10′E
- Country: India
- State: Karnataka
- District: Hassan district
- Talukas: Arsikere
  - Rank: 2nd in the taluk

Population (2011)
  - Total: 11,265

Languages
  - Official: Kannada
- Time zone: UTC+5:30 (IST)
- Postal code: 573112
- Nearest city: Arsikere

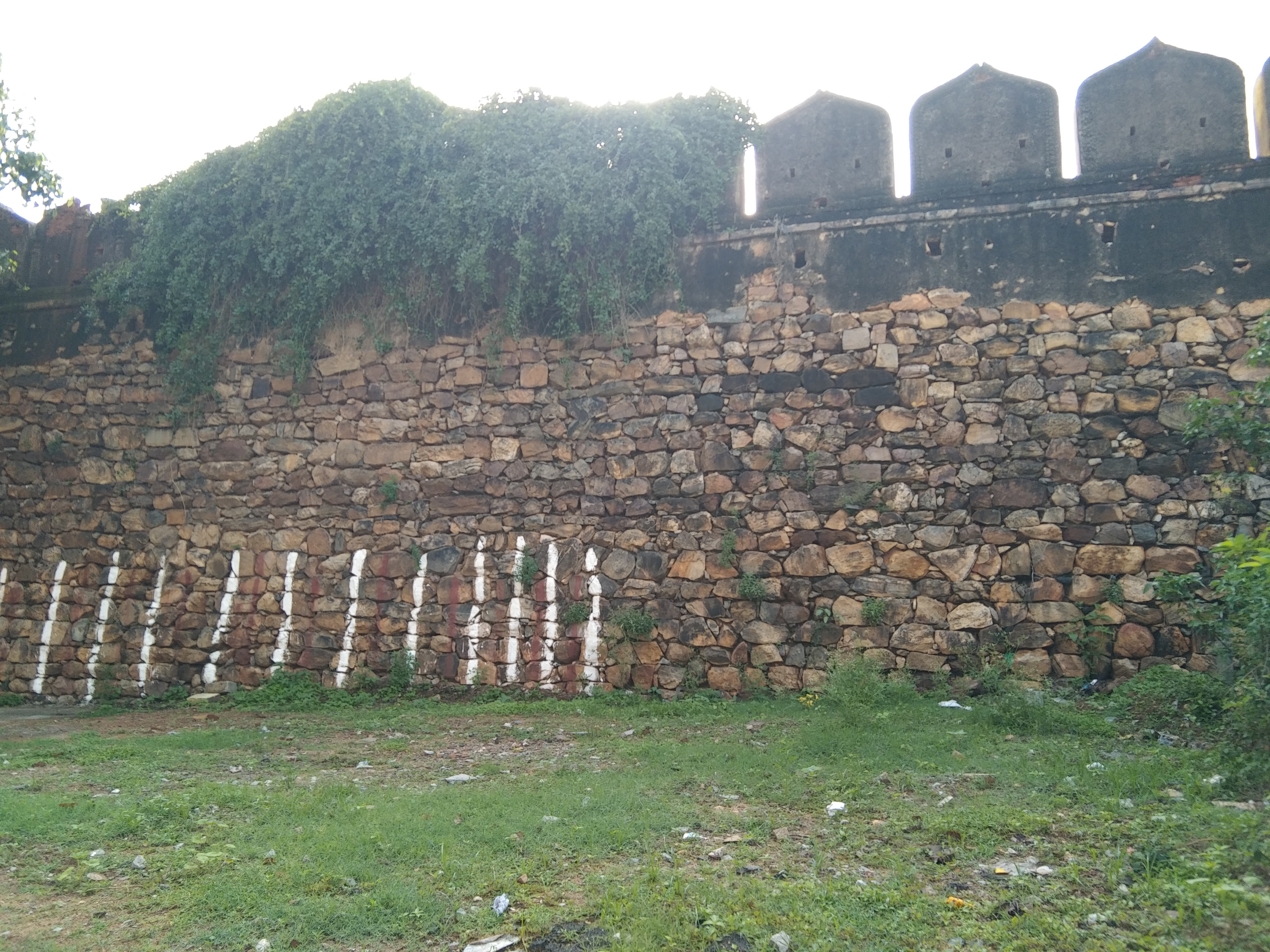
Banavara

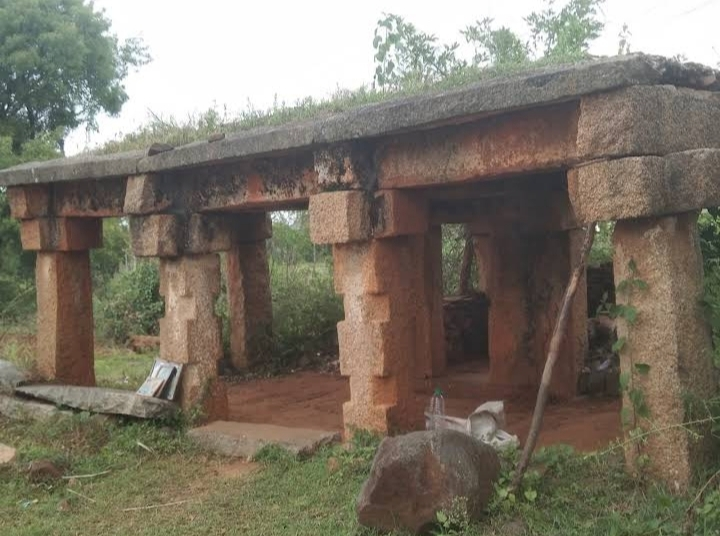
bagalagatha hunuman temple

Banavara is a town in the south Indian state of Karnataka.

== Geography ==
Banavara is located in the Arsikere taluk of Hassan district in Karnataka. It is located 15 km from Arsikere city. It is known for its clothing stores.

Banavara is a Hobli that has many villages.

== Culture ==
Villages with historical importance include Manakathuru. (ಮನಕತ್ತೂರು) which hosts Kalabaireshwara temple (ಕಾಲ ಭೈರೆಶ್ವರ ದೇವಸ್ಥಾನ) and is located 4 km from ಬಾಣಾವರ. Mallapura villages, located 2 km north-east of Banavara in Huliyar road.

== Transport ==
The National Highways NH 206 and NH 234 pass through Banavara. Banavar railway station is the nearest railway connection located on Bengaluru–Arsikere–Hubballi line.

== Demographics ==
As of 2001 India census, Banavara had a population of 8,327, including 4,214 males and 4,113 females.

== Gallery ==
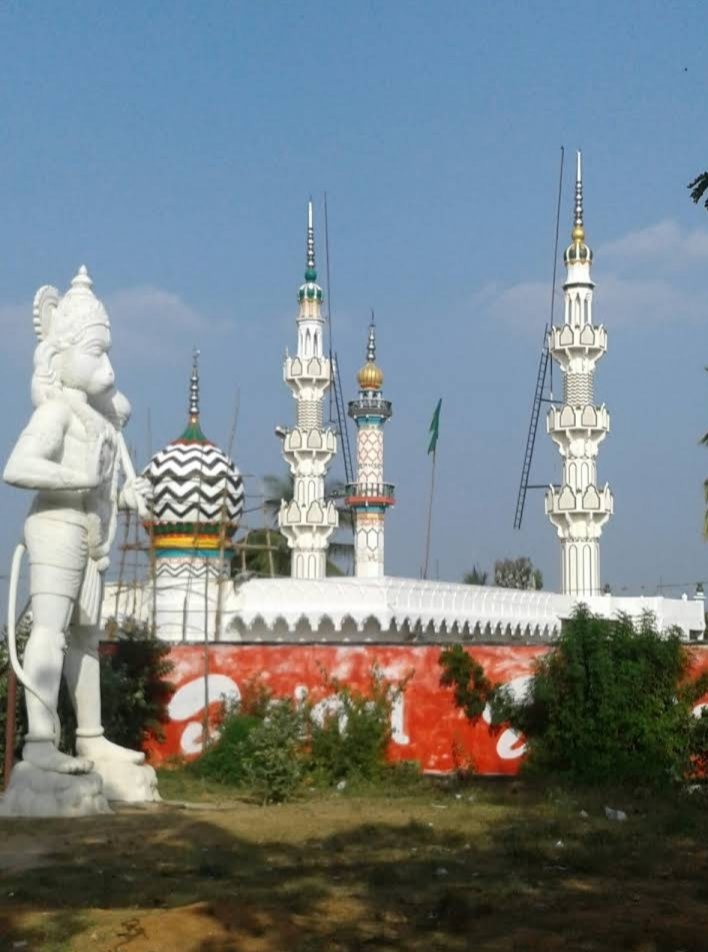
hanuman

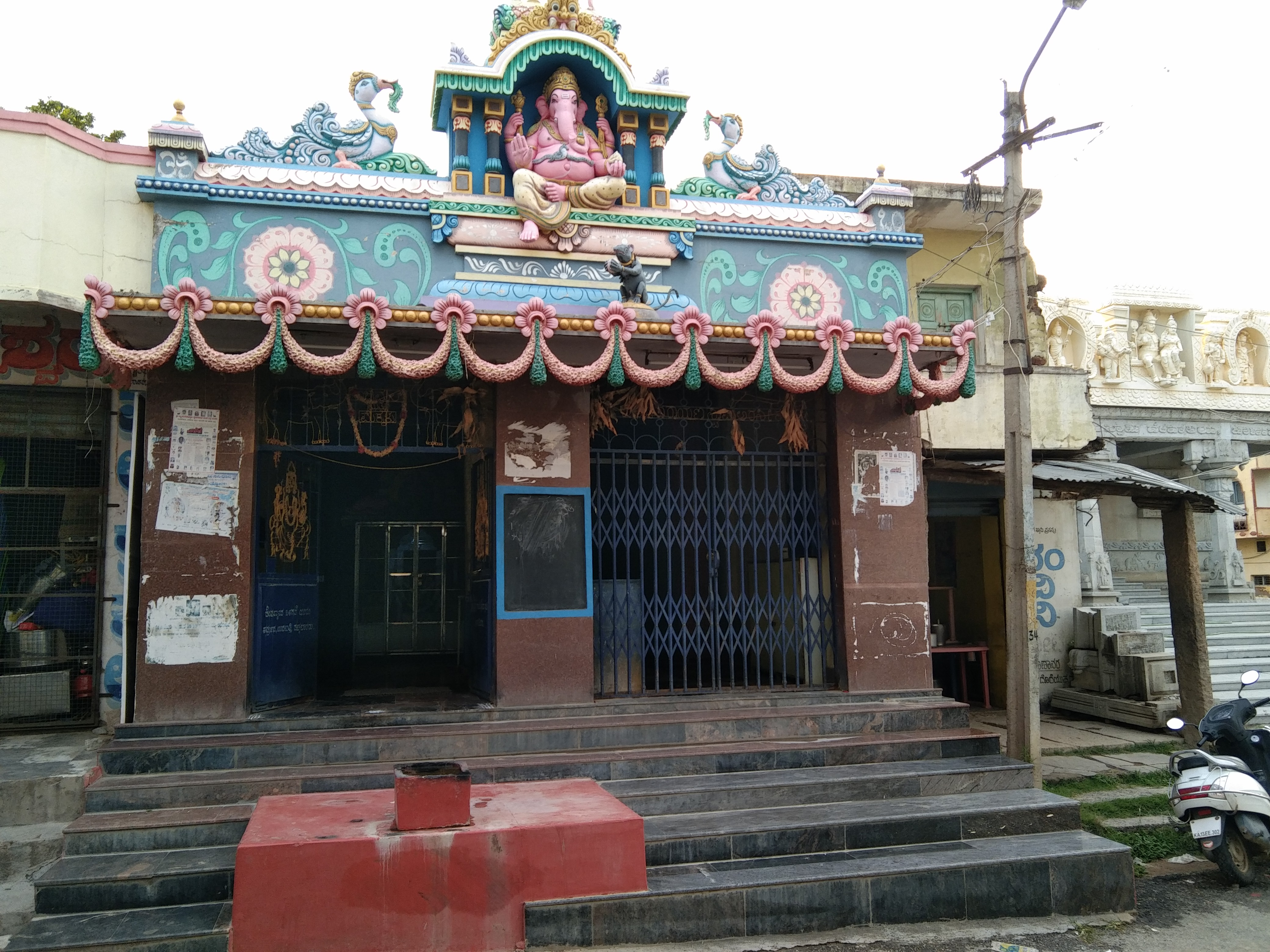
ganapathi temple banavara

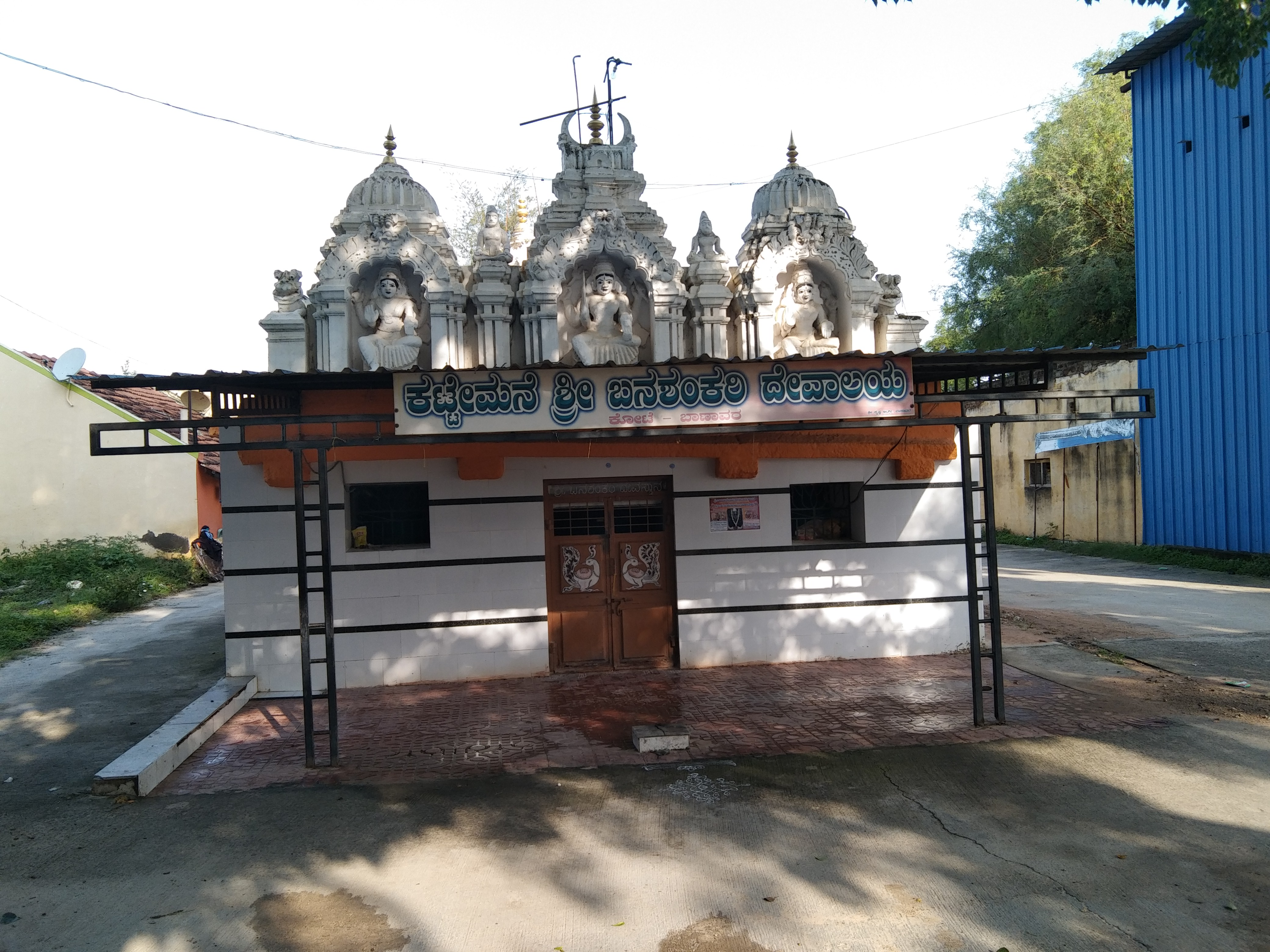
Banashankari temple

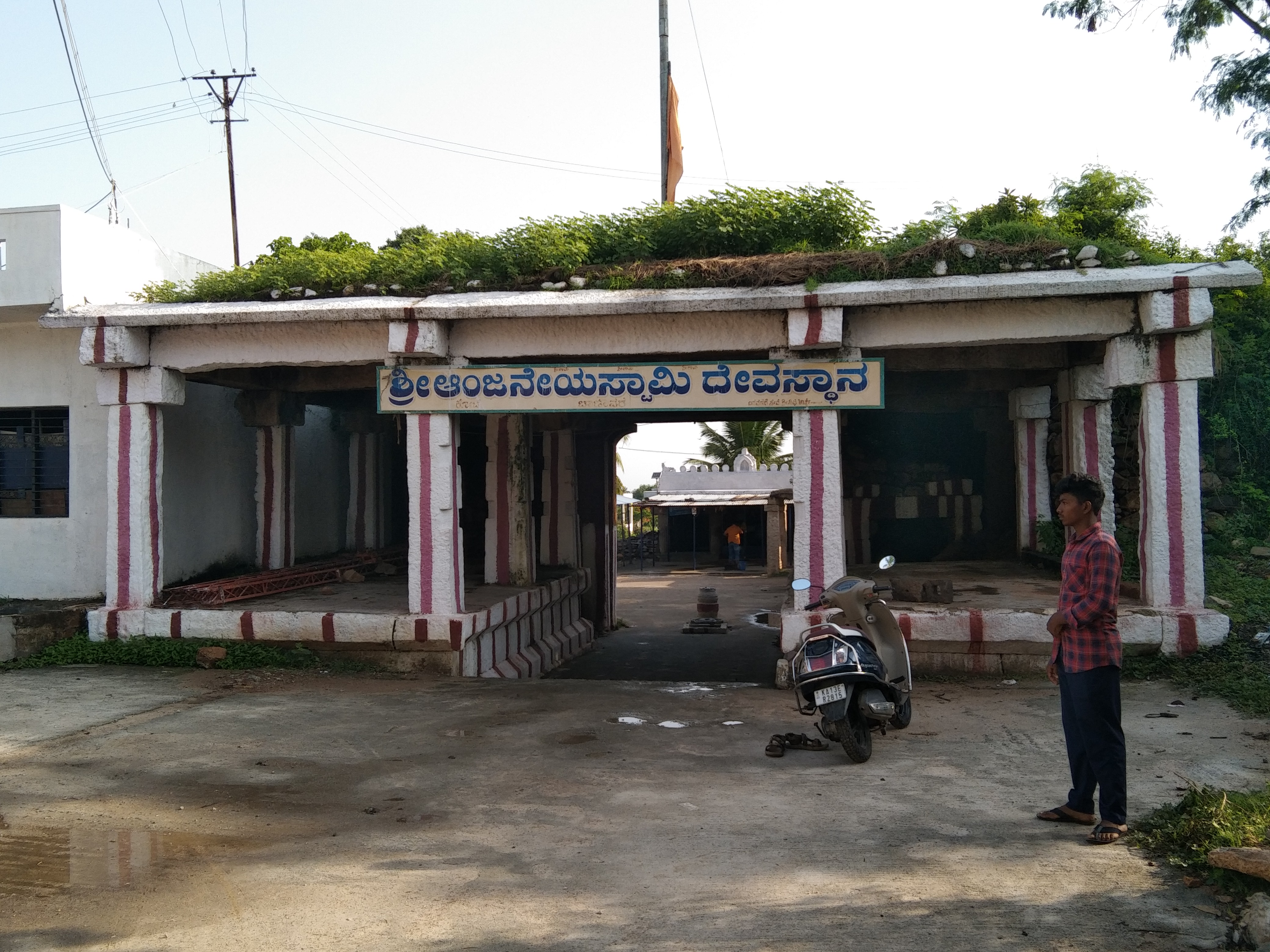
Kote Anjaneya Swamy Temple

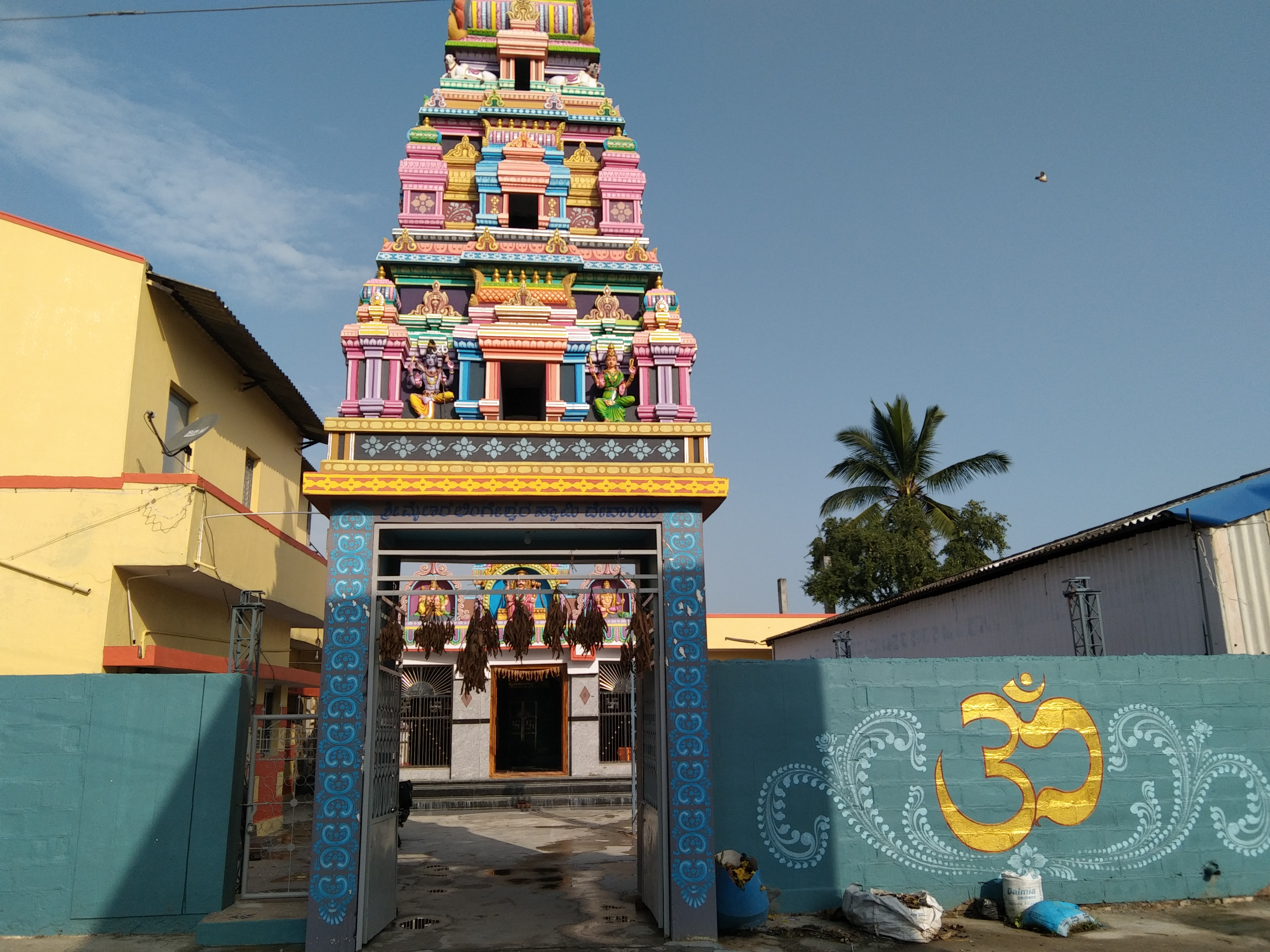
mylara lingeshwara temple

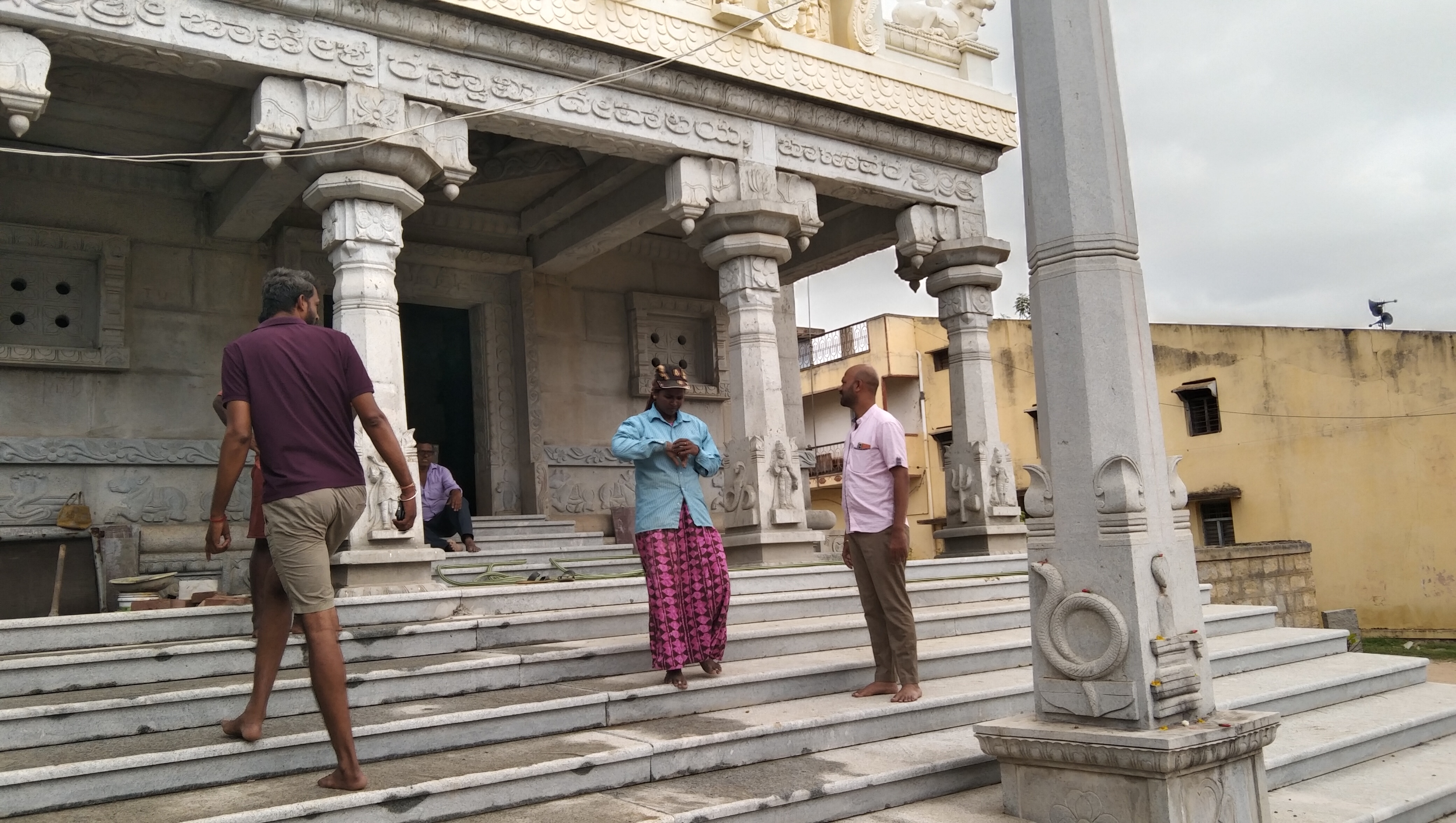
Banavara old temple

== Notable people ==
- B.S. Raja Iyengar - Court Musician in kingdom of Mysore
