= Rural Development Foundation, India =

Non-governmental organization

The Rural Development Foundation (RDF) is a non-governmental organization headquartered in Hyderabad, Telangana, India. It promotes rural development mainly through education: building and operating high-quality, non-sectarian schools in underserved villages in Telangana & Andhra.

== History ==
RDF began as a family initiative. It was conceived by several members of the Errabelli (or Erraballi) family, descendants of those who had amassed considerable wealth and build an imposing 40-room mansion in Kalleda village, Warangal District, Telangana. In 1996 the NGO was registered, with a board of directors that included a range of people accomplished in government, education and business. The current secretary of RDF is Vandita Rao of Hyderabad.

Also in 1996, a US-based foundation named the India Rural Development Fund was chartered. Its primary function is to generate support for RDF, although it also makes contributions to some other Indian poverty-alleviation projects. The current president is Sunil Erraballi, founder of Frontier Technology.

Top: Students in Matendla village, Medak District, attend classes in 2002 before they have a building. Bottom: Students study math in the new Matendla Rural School building, 2005.

== Educational work ==
The same year that RDF was founded it opened the Kalleda Rural School in the Errabelli family mansion. By 2003 KRS had grown to its full size of 560 students in grades from kindergarten through grade 10. The school reserves many seats for Scheduled Caste and Tribal children, and approximately half of its seats for girls. It provides a nutritious lunch to all students, featuring vegetables grown on the school’s mostly organic farm with help from the students.

In 2000 RDF began work on its second school, in Matendla village of Medak District, A.P. Matendla is a particularly impoverished area with no school whatsoever. Matendla Rural School began instruction before it had a building, with students attending classes held under palm trees. In 2004 it inaugurated its own building, which now serves a student body of 400 students.

Since then, RDF has started four other rural schools. In 2007 it opened the Vanitha Achutha Pai junior college (grades 11-12) in a newly built campus near to the original Kalleda Rural School. The junior college hosts the Village India Program every summer, run in collaboration with Washington University in St. Louis. The Village India Program brings Washington University students to teach English-medium minicourses in a variety of subjects.

== Development philosophy ==
Over its first decade of operation, RDF has developed a philosophy of development with three basic components.

First and is the emphasis on high-quality affordable education for rural children. With its information economy, India is a land where a education is often a ticket out of poverty, but it is also a land with extreme educational stratification: students with opportunity and means can get an excellent education, while the majority of students have access to poor schools. Rural schools are notoriously poor in contemporary India. RDF works closely with its teachers, providing assessments and progressive teaching techniques. It also provides scholarship aid to extremely poor children.

Second is extra-curricular support for students. Children from poor rural backgrounds often lack the confidence, knowledge, connections, and family support needed to move into good careers. Therefore, RDF staff take personal interest in students and assist in various ways, including providing personal counseling, persuading parents to keep children in school, seeking sponsors for students, and providing logistical support for graduates seeking employment or further training away from home.

Third is keeping graduates connected to their home areas. Helping rural kids graduate and move to middle class careers in the city only depletes rural resources unless the graduates remain closely involved with their homecommunities.

Left: Pranitha and Fauzia, Hindu and Muslim girls at KRS in 2004. Pranitha later went to the Beijing Olympics on the Indian archery team, and Fauzia began a career with General Electric, Hyderabad. Right: Fauzia returned to Kalleda in 2008 to encourage younger students.

RDF's encouragement to stay involved has paid off, as recent graduates who have gotten excellent jobs in Hyderabad have immediately called RDF to say they could now sponsor a child's education back in the village. Graduates also return to participate in village life, and offer advice and encouragement to younger students. RDF's goal is eventually have all its school supported by its alumni.
