= National Highway 206 (India) =

National highway in India

National Highway 206
- Map of the National Highway 206 in red
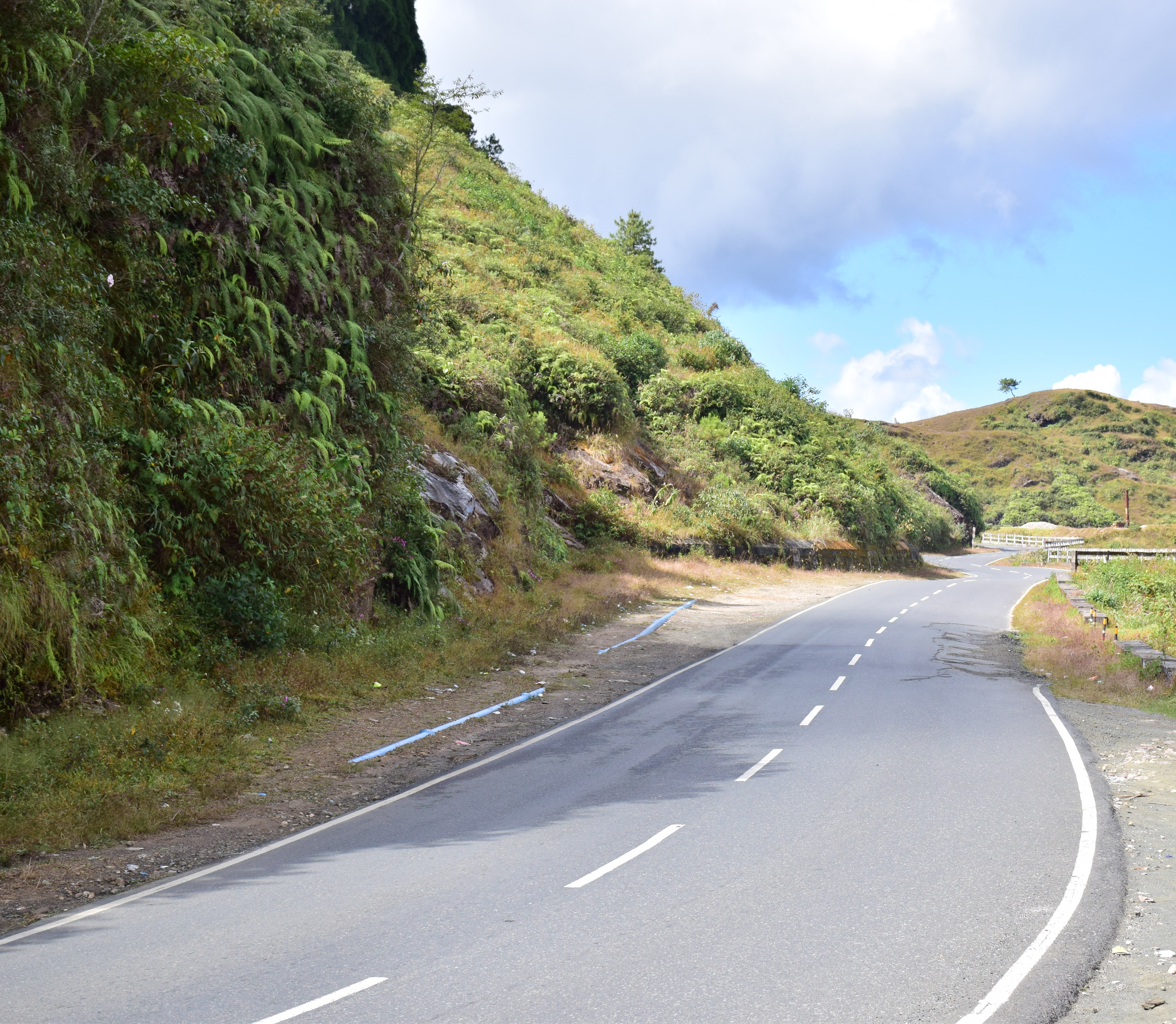

Route information
- Part of AH1 AH2
- Length: 126 km (78 mi)

Major junctions
- North end: Jowai
- South end: Mylliem

Location
- Country: India
- States: Meghalaya

Highway system
- Roads in India; Expressways; National; State; Asian

National Highway 206 commonly referred to as NH 206, is a highway in the Indian state Meghalaya. Starting from Jowai near NH 106, it goes via Dawki and ends at Mylliem. It is also a part of Shillong-Sylhet road. It is a spur of National Highway 6.

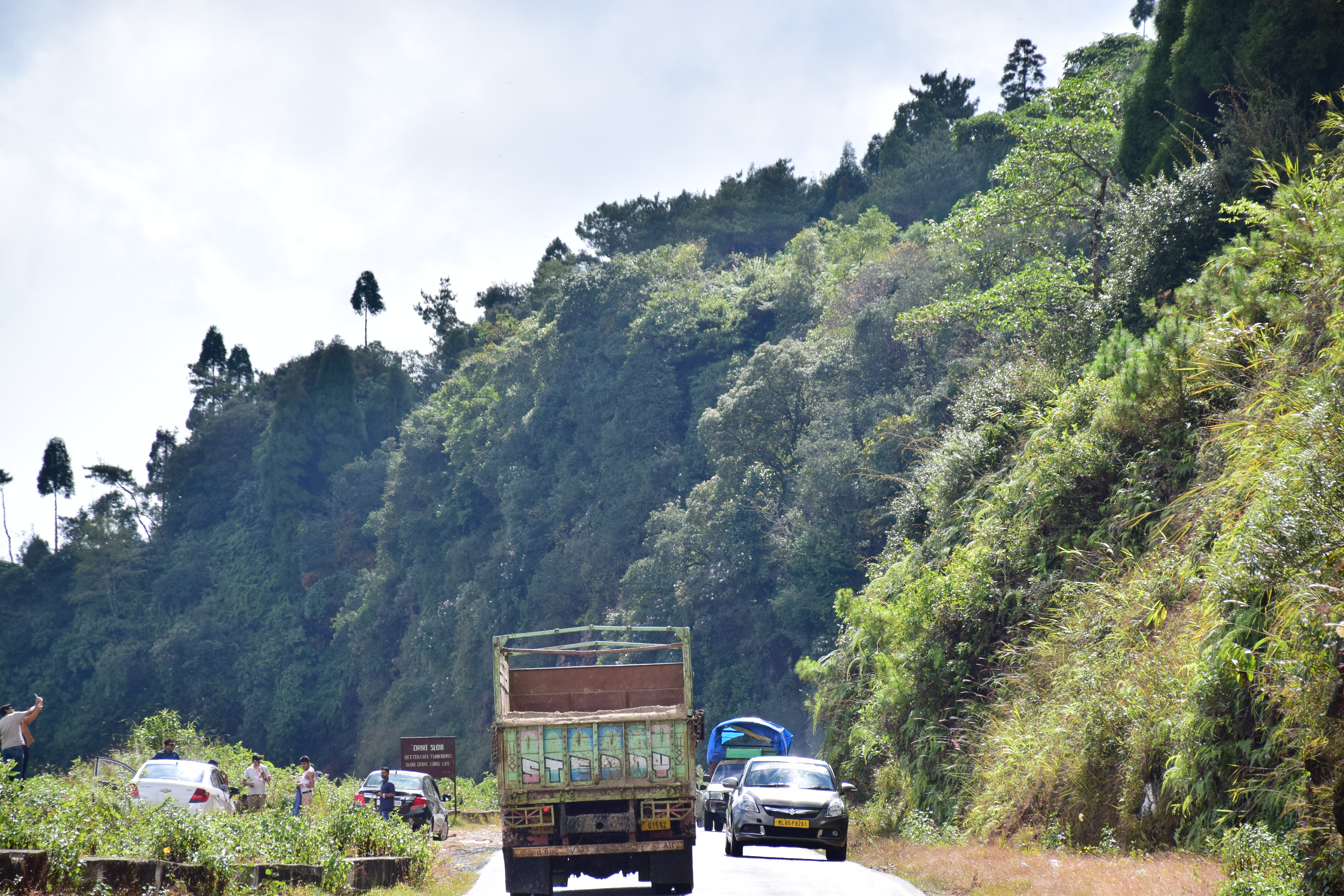
NH 206 in Meghalaya

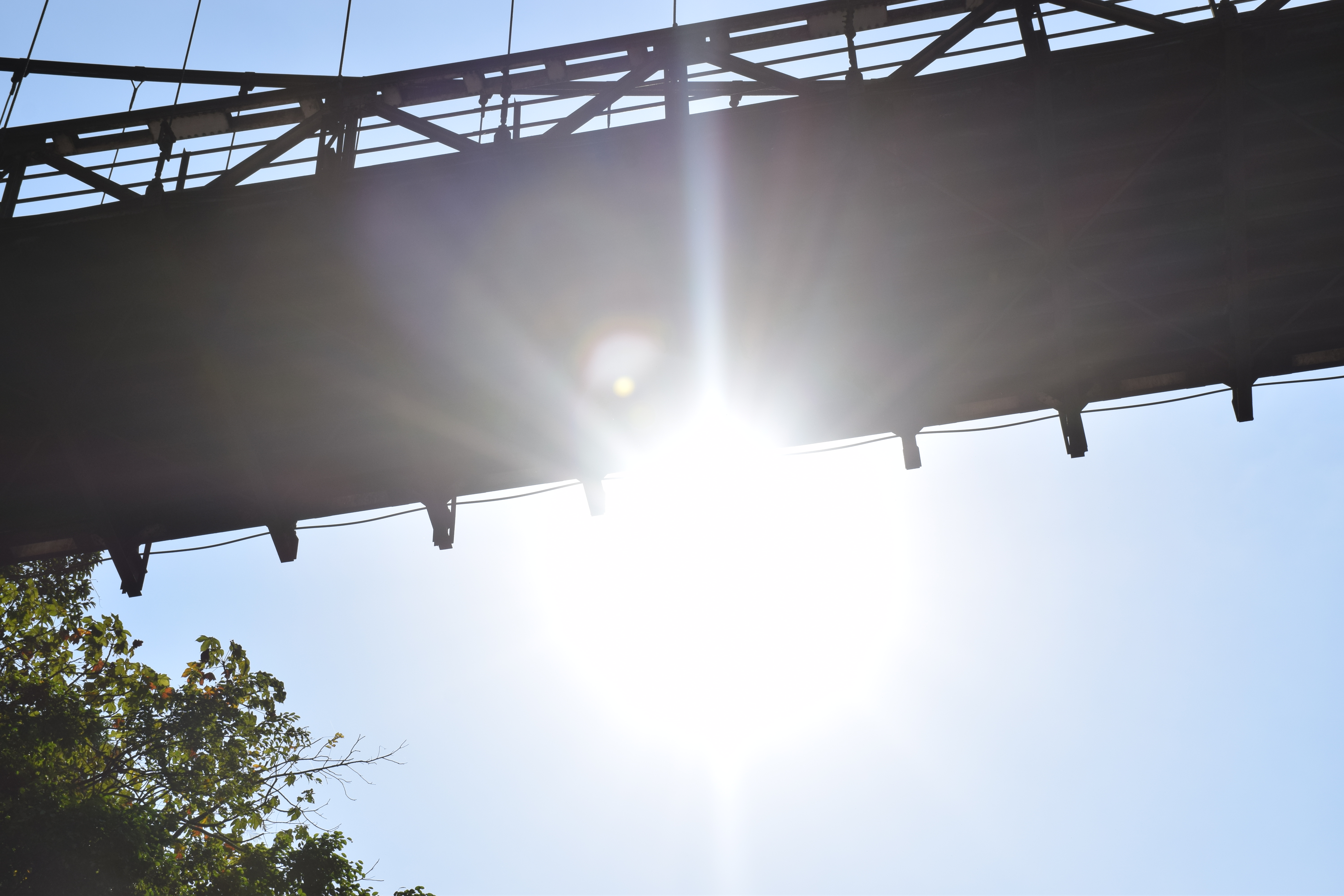
View of NH 206 from Dawki River

== See also ==
- List of national highways in India
- National Highways Development Project
