= Dorairaj Prabhakaran =

Indian researcher

- Education: All India Institute of Medical Sciences (MD: Internal Medicine and DM: Cardiology) and McMaster University Canada, MSc: Health Research Methodology
- Occupations: Cardiologist, Epidemiologist, author, researcher

Dorairaj Prabhakaran is a scientist, cardiologist, author, researcher and currently Executive Director of the Centre for Chronic Disease Control (CCDC).

He is a professor at the London School of Hygiene & Tropical Medicine (LSHTM), and Emory University, Atlanta, USA.

== Awards ==
- Claude Lenfant Excellence Award from the World Hypertension League

== Bibliography ==
- Public Health Approach to Cardiovascular Disease Prevention & Management
- Social Determinants of Health and Disparities in Hypertension and Cardiovascular Diseases
- Methods and participant characteristics in the Cancer Risk in Vegetarians Consortium
- Rationale, Design and Baseline Characteristics of a Randomized Controlled Trial of a Cardiovascular Quality Improvement Strategy in India: The C-QIP Trial
- Tandon's Textbook of Cardiology, 2ed
