= V. K. R. V. Rao =

Indian Economist and Founder of D-School, University of Delhi

Union Minister of Education
- In office 14 February 1969 – 18 March 1971
- Prime Minister: Indira Gandhi
- Preceded by: Triguna Sen
- Succeeded by: Siddhartha Shankar Ray

Union Minister of Shipping and Transport
- In office 13 March 1967 – 14 February 1969
- Prime Minister: Indira Gandhi
- Preceded by: Neelam Sanjiva Reddy
- Succeeded by: Kotha Raghuramaiah

Personal details
- Born: Vijayendra Kasturi Ranga Varadaraja Rao; 8 July 1908 Kancheepuram, Madras Presidency, British India
- Died: 25 July 1991 (aged 83)
- Occupation: Politician, economist
- Awards: Padma Vibhushan (1974)

Vijayendra Kasturi Ranga Varadaraja Rao (8 July 1908 – 25 July 1991) was an Indian economist, politician and educator.

== Early life and education ==
Rao was born in a Kannada speaking Madhwa Brahmin family on 8 July 1908 at Kancheepuram in Tamil Nadu to Kasturirangachar and Bharati Amma. He had his early schooling in Tindivanam and Madras (Chennai). He obtained a B.A and M.A. in economics from Bombay University (now Mumbai University) before earning another B.A. from Cambridge, where he was a member of Gonville and Caius College. He was awarded the Ph.D. of Cambridge in 1937; the title of his doctoral thesis was "The National Income of British India, 1931-1932". He studied with John Maynard Keynes.

== Career ==
He served as a Union Minister for Education in 1971, elected as a member for Bellary in 1967 and 1971. He was awarded the Padma Vibhushan by the Government of India in 1974.

== Institute builder ==
The Central Institute of Indian Languages, Mysuru, an office of the Ministry of Human Resource Development, is considered to be the brainchild of Rao.

== Publications ==
Notable among his works are: Taxation of Income in India (1931), An essay on India’s National Income -1925-29 – (1936); The National Income of British India (1940); India and International Currency Plans (1945); Post-War Rupee (1948); Greater Delhi A Study in Urbanization 1940-1957 (1965); Gandhian Alternative to Western Socialism (1970); Values and Economic Development – The Indian Challenge (1971); the Nehru Legacy (1971); Swami Vivekananda – Prophet of Vedantic Socialism (1978); Many Languages and One Nation – the Problem of Integration (1979); India’s National Income 1950-80 (1983) Food, Nutrition and Poverty (1982); Indian socialism: Retrospect and Prospect (1982), etc.

== Positions held ==
- Adviser for Planning, Food Department (1945–46)
- Food and Economic Adviser, Government of India at Washington (1946–47)
- Director, Delhi School of Economics, Delhi (1948–57)
- Vice Chancellor, University of Delhi (1957–60)
- Director, Institute of Economic Growth, Delhi (1960–63)
- Member, Planning Commission (1963–66)
- Union Cabinet Minister for Transport and Shipping (1967–69)
- Union Cabinet Minister for Education & Youth Services (1969–71)
- Director, Institute for Social and Economic Change, Bangalore (1972–77)
- National Professor, Government of India (1985-1990).

== Legacy ==
He is commemorated by the VKRV Rao prizes in Social Science Research.
