= Tiptur =

- City
- Tipaturu
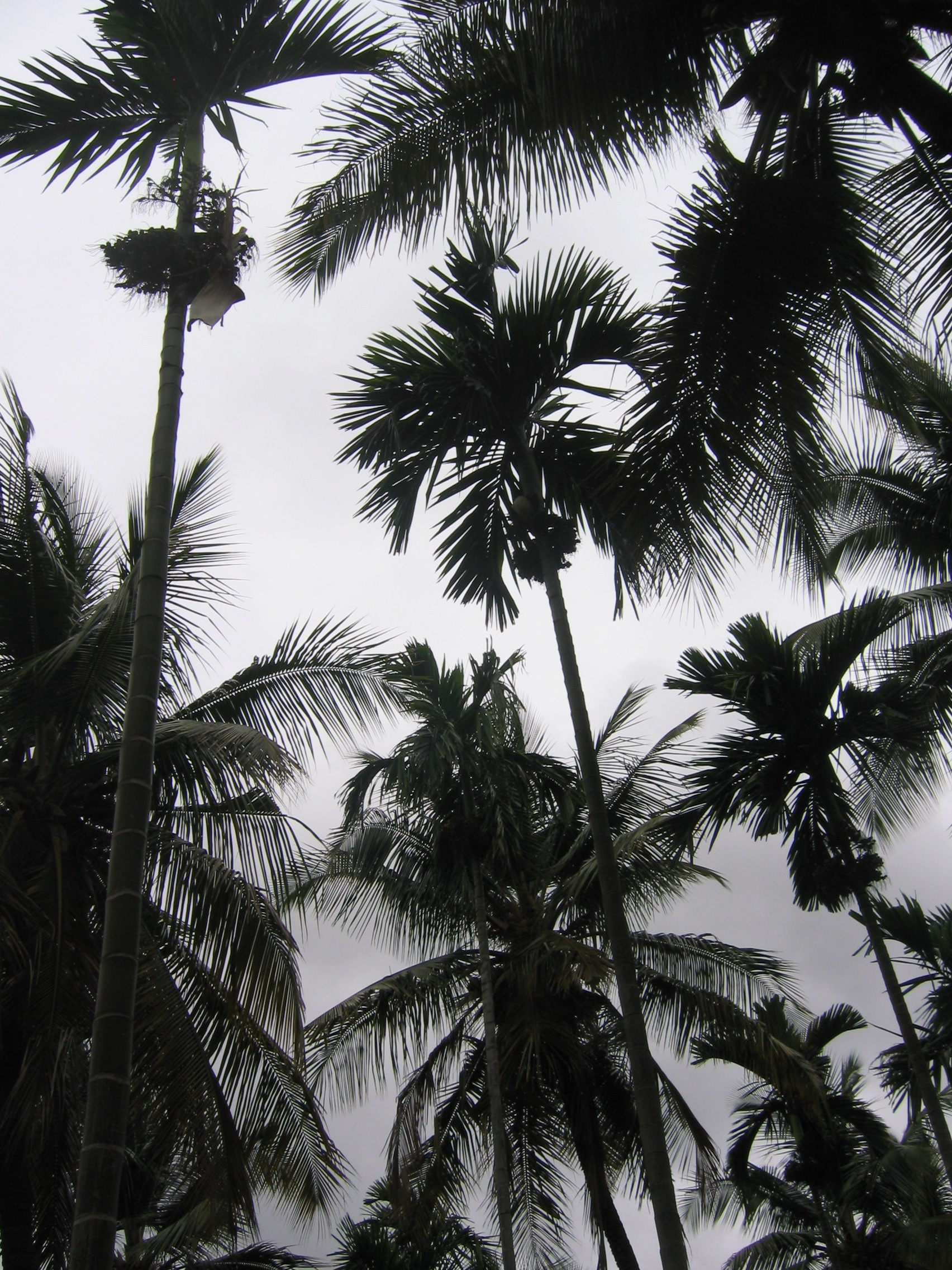
- Coconut Plantation Near Tiptur
- Nickname: Kalpataru Nadu
- Location in Karnataka, India Tiptur (India)
- Coordinates: 13.26°N 76.48°E
- Country: India
- State: Karnataka
- District: Tumkur
- Region: Bayalu Seeme
- Named for: Copra

Government
  - Body: City Municipal Council
  - Municipal Commissioner: Sri. Vishweshwar Badaragade
  - Subdivisional Magistrate/AC: Sapthashree B K
  - Administrator of CMC/DC: Smt. Subha Kalyan _{I.A.S}

Area
  - City: 11.6 km^{2} (4.5 sq mi)
  - Rural: 786 km^{2} (303 sq mi)
- Elevation: 862 m (2,828 ft)

Population (2011)
  - City: 59,543
  - Density: 5,130/km^{2} (13,300/sq mi)
  - Rural: 163,206
- Demonym(s): Tipturians, Tipturinavaru

Languages
  - Official: Kannada
- Time zone: UTC+5:30 (IST)
- PIN: 572201 & 572202
- STD_ISD: +91(0)8134
- Vehicle registration: KA-44
- Lok Sabha: Tumkur Lok Sabha constituency
- Vidhan Sabha: Tiptur Assembly constituency
- Present MLA: K Shadakshari (INC)
- Present MP: V.Somanna (BJP)
- Railway station code: TTR
- Website: http://www.tipturcity.mrc.gov.in

Tiptur or Thipatooru is a city, taluk in the southern part of the state of Karnataka, India. It is one of the three sub-divisional headquarters of Tumakuru district in Karnataka. Capital city Bengaluru is 140 km from Tiptur. Tiptur city is known for its coconut plantations so it is often referred to as Kalpataru Nadu. It is the second largest and fastest growing city in Tumkur District.

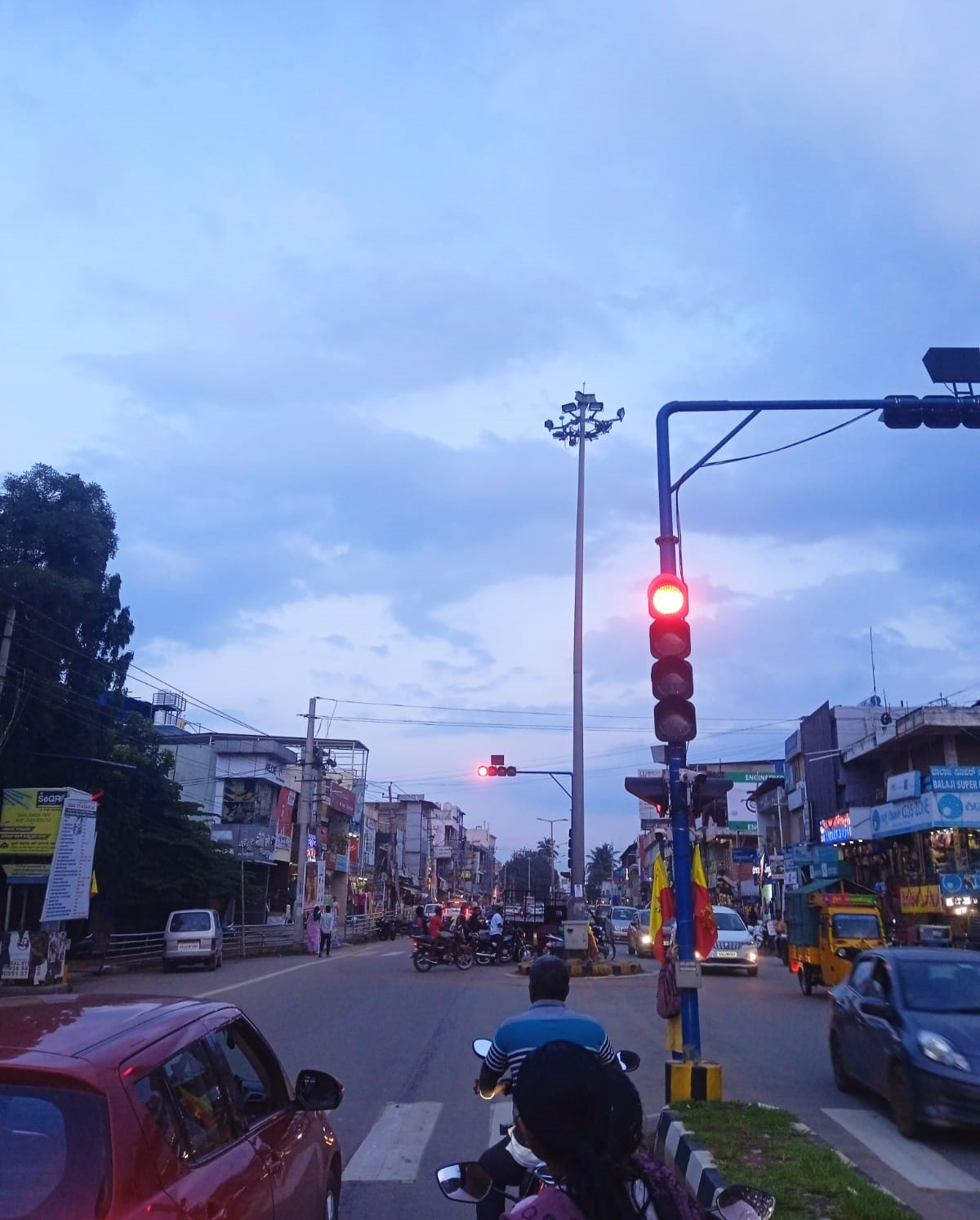

== Etymology ==
Thipatooru is said to have got its name from "tipatala", the word for "copra" in the local language, Kannada. The name was probably derived from the industry which produces dried coconut in the areas surrounding the city.

== History ==
Tiptur was historically a part of Honnavalli, a village headquarters located 11 miles northwest of Tiptur in Tumkur district. Honnavalli was the taluk headquarters until 1886. The history of the village dates back to eleventh century . It was built by the king Someswara Raaya, who belonged to the Harnahalli Nayak dynasty. Legend has it that Honnu Amma, the family deity of the Paalegaar, appeared in a dream and directed him to build a model village in her name. Even today 'Honnavalli Amma' is the village goddess.

Tiptur Lok Sabha constituency was a former Lok Sabha constituency in Mysore State (Karnataka from 1957 to 1967). This seat came into existence in 1957 and ceased to exist in 1966, before 1967 Lok Sabha Elections. This constituency was later merged with Tumkur Lok Sabha constituency.

== Geography ==
Thipatooru has been surrounded by from the west side Arsikere and channarayapatna. from the east side Chikkanayakana halli, Gubbi, Turuvekere. Thipatooru is approximately 73 km (45 mi) west of Tumkur along National Highway 206 (now renumbered as National Highway 48). It is at a distance of 140 km (87 mi) northwest from the state capital, Bangalore. It lies on the Bangalore-Miraj railway line. Thipatooru has an average elevation of 861 metres (2,825 ft). The average temperature in summer is 34 °C (93 °F) and in winter is 20 °C (68 °F).

=== Fauna ===
Mammalian fauna in the region includes Indian grey mongoose, wild boar, golden jackal and the occasional sloth bear. Reports of leopards have also been known in the surrounding region; and a single grey slender loris has been sighted in the Kalpataru College in 2016. Avifauna includes passerines such as bulbuls, sunbirds and flamebacks and larger birds such as the woolly-necked stork and winter visitors such as bar-headed geese. The peacock is very common in the region.

== Civic administration ==
The Thipatooru City Municipal Council (CMC) comprises 31 wards, with a councillor for each ward. The CMC covers an area of 11.6 km. Thipatooru city has JMFC court complex. There is 4 hoblis in the Thipatooru taluk Kasaba, Honnavalli, Nonavinakere, KB cross.

== Economy ==
Thipatooru has an Agricultural Produce Market Committee (APMC) market. Auctions are held every Wednesday and Saturday. Farmers from nearby taluks and villages and even as far as Channarayapatna KR Pete Nagamangala BellurCross, Hirisaave, Turuvekere Arsikere ChikkanayakanaHalli Gubbi Kadur Banavara Huliyar towns carry their copra produce to the market for auction. Several copra desiccated powder industries in and around Thipatooru export their products to different parts of India and the world. Traders from Thipatooru supply copra throughout the world.

with this many silk firms is also there where they produce silk sarees. two big garments is there which gives more number of employment for the people. Many small scall industries is also present which countributs to the economy of the city.

== Transport ==
=== By road ===
Thipatooru is well connected by road routes. Both KSRTC and private bus service is available connecting with major cities of the State including Bangalore, Shimoga, Hassan, Chikmagalur, Tumkur, Davanagere, Ballari, Chitradurga.

=== By rail ===
Thipatooru has two railway stations in its city limits. Tiptur railway station and Sree Saradanagar Halt railway station with connections to Bangalore, Shivamogga, Chikkamagaluru, Hubballi and much more other cities.

== Education ==
There are a number of government, aided and private educational institutions which offer courses including in pre-university courses, degrees, master's degrees and other technical courses.

== Notable people ==
- Narasimharaju, Kannada actor, known for comic roles
- Umashree, Kannada actress and politician
- Achyuth Kumar, actor
- Raja Ramanna, nuclear scientist; supervised Pokhran Nuclear Tests of 1974
