= Amrutesvara Temple, Amruthapura =

Temple in Karnataka, India

- village
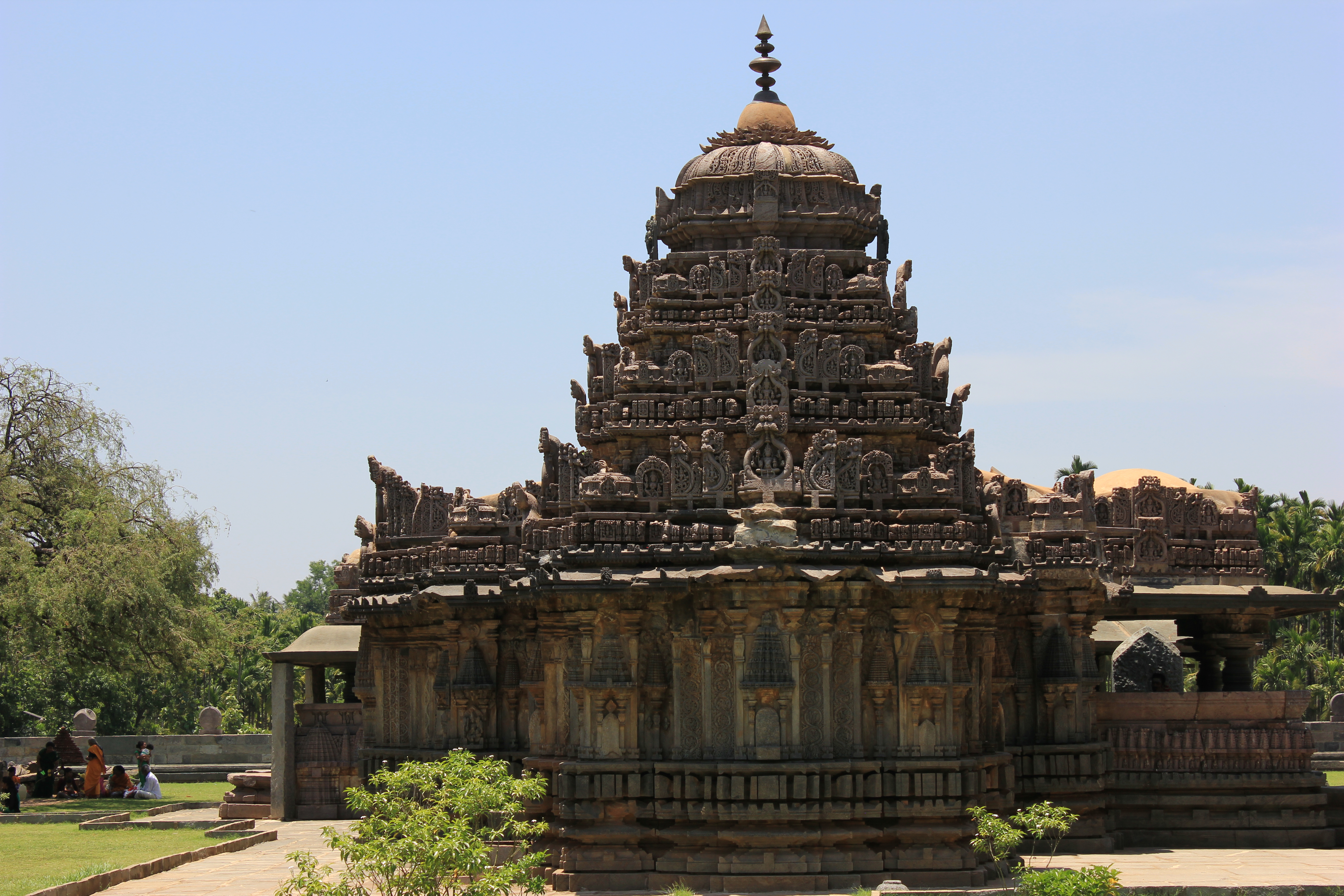
- Ekakuta (singly shrined), Amruteshvara temple, 1196, Chikkamagaluru district

- Location in Karnataka, India
- Coordinates: 13.741°N 75.854°E
- Country: India
- State: Karnataka
- District: Chikkamagaluru District
- Established: 1196 CE

Languages
  - Official: Kannada
- Time zone: UTC+5:30 (IST)

The Amruteshvara temple also spelt "Amrutesvara" or "Amruteshwara", is located in the village of Amruthapura, 67 km north of Chikmagalur town in the Chikkamagaluru district of the Karnataka state, India. Located 110 km from Hassan and 50 km from Shimoga on NH 206, Amruthapura is known for the Amruteshvara temple. The temple was built in 1196 CE by Amrutheshwara Dandanayaka (lit, "commander") under Hoysala King Veera Ballala II.

== Amrutesvara temple ==
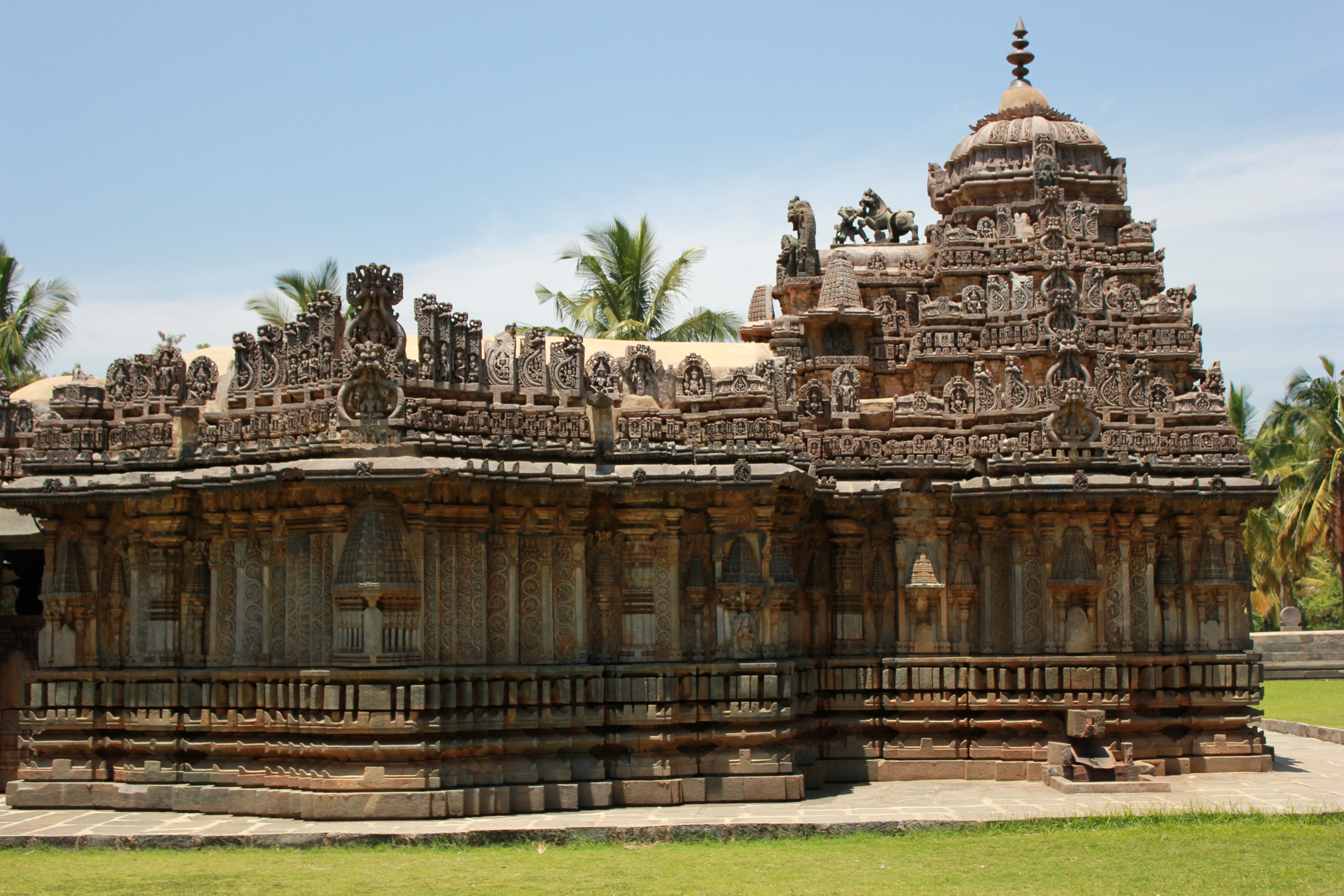
Profile, Amrutesvara temple (1196 CE)

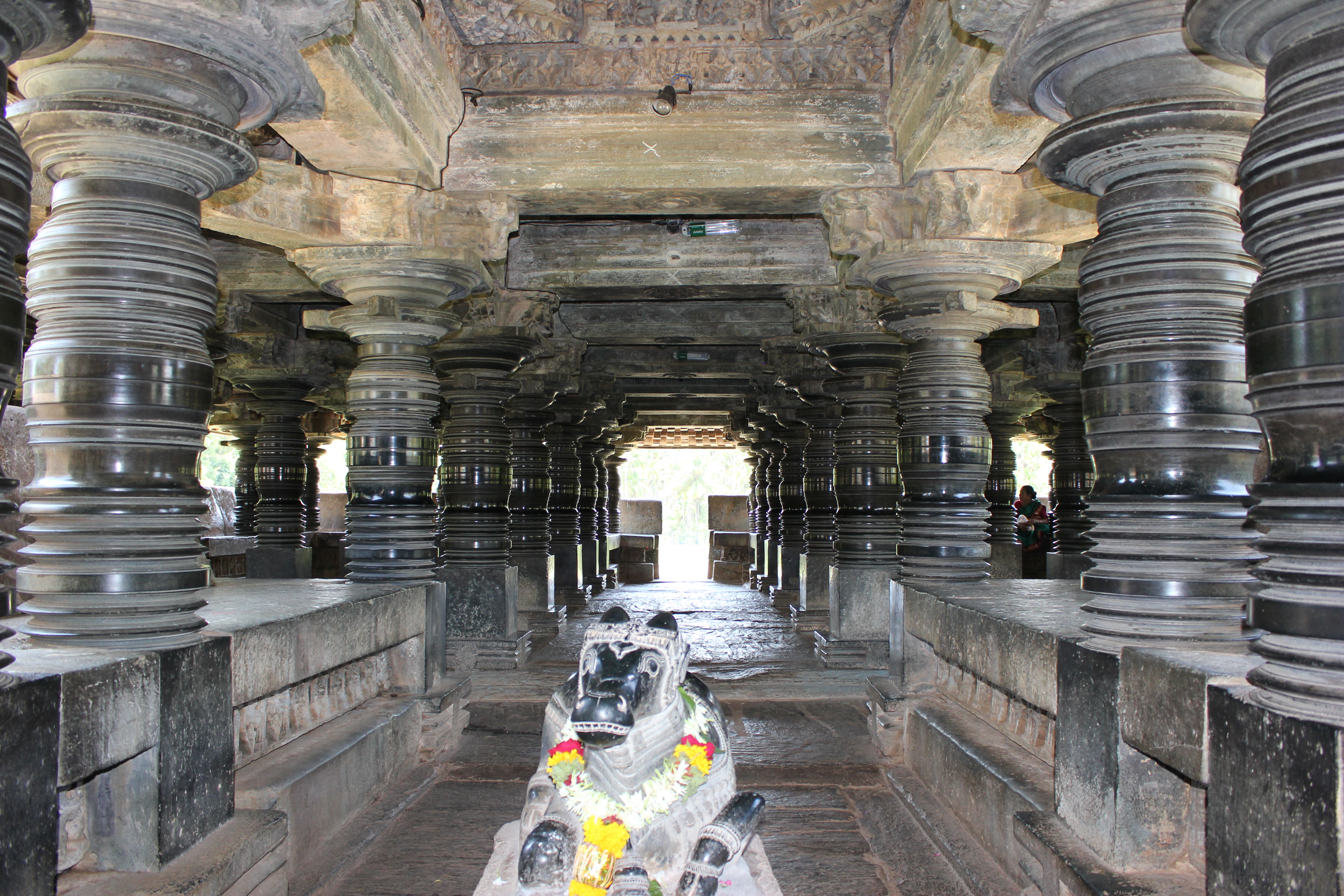
Open mantapa (hall) with shining, lathe-turned pillars in Amrutesvara temple at Amruthapura

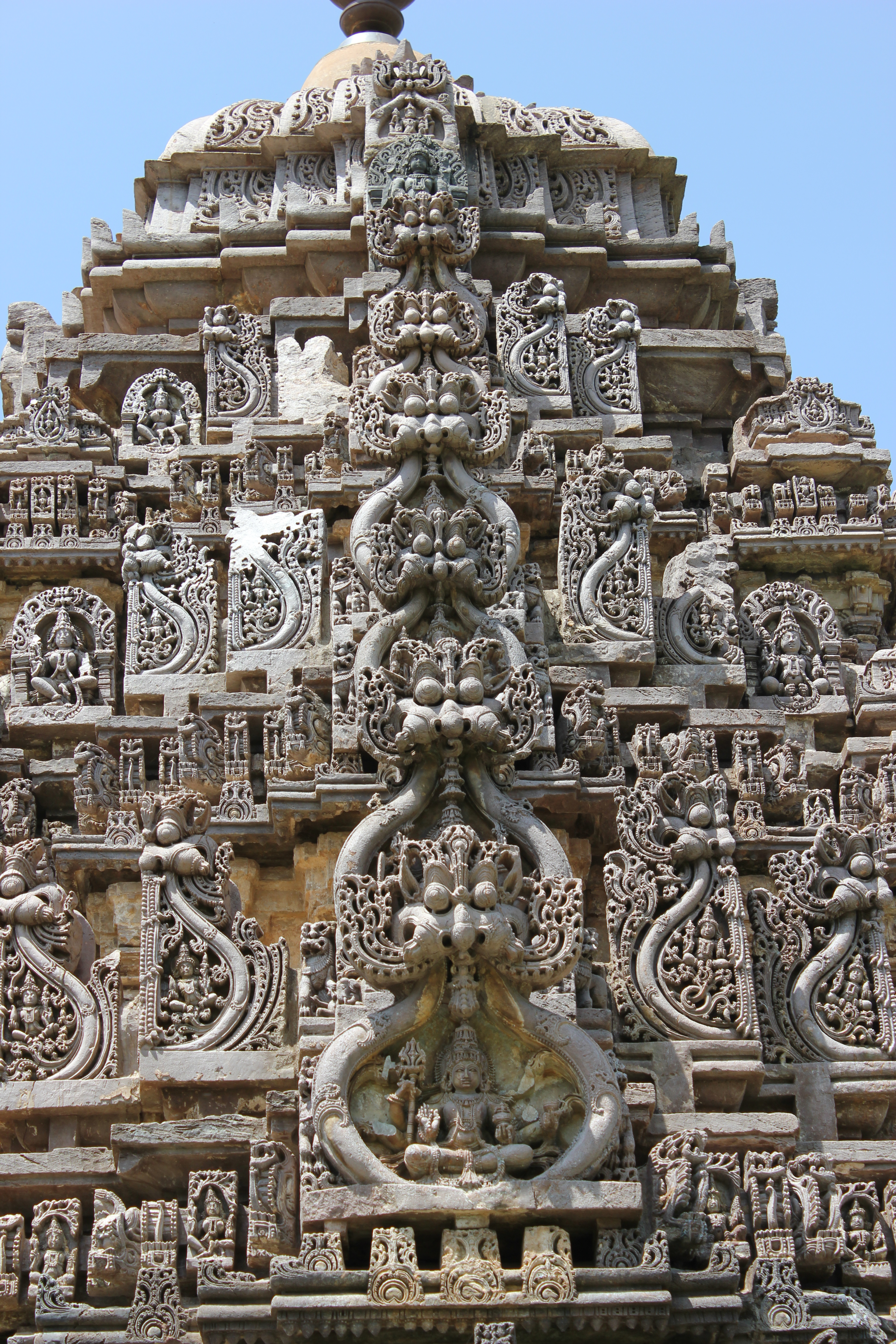
Kirtimukha decoration (demon faces) on Shikhara (tower) at Amruthapura

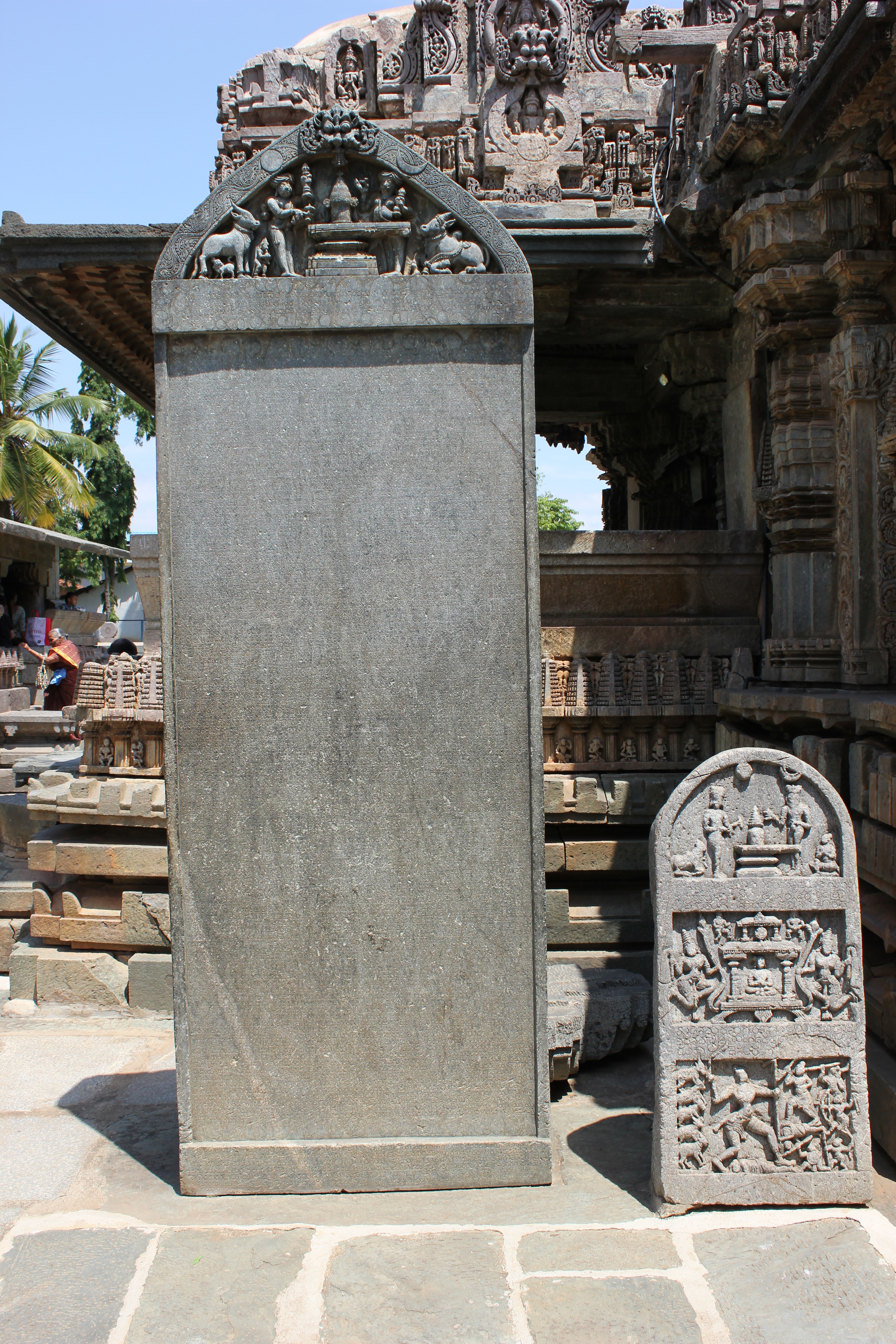
Old Kannada inscription (1196 CE) in the Amrutesvara temple at Amruthapura

The temple is a built according to Hoysala architecture with a wide open mantapa (hall). The temple has an original outer wall with unique equally spaced circular carvings. The temple has one vimana (shrine and tower) and therefore is a ekakuta design, and has a closed mantapa (hall) that connects the sanctum to the large open mantapa.

It is medium-sized Hoysala temple with certain vastu features similar to the Veera Narayana Temple, Belavadi in mantapa structure and size. The open mantapa has twenty nine bays, and the closed mantapa has nine bays with a side porch that leads to a separate shrine on the south side. The shrine is square in shape has the original superstructure (shikhara) which is adorned with sculptures of Kirtimukhas (demon faces), miniature decorative towers (aedicule). Below the superstructure, the usually seen panel of Hindu deities is absent. The base of the wall has five mouldings which according to art critic Foekema is an "older Hoysala style". The sukanasi, the tower on top of the vestibule that connects the sanctum to the closed mantapa (the Sukanasi appears like the nose of the superstructure), has the original Hoysala emblem of "Sala" fighting the lion.

The rows of shining lathe turned pillars that support the ceiling of the mantapa is a Hoysala-Chalukya decorative idiom. The mantapa has many deeply domed inner ceiling structures adorned with floral designs. The outer parapet wall of the open mantapa has a total of hundred and forty panel sculptures with depictions from the Hindu epics. Unlike many Hoysala temples where the panels are small and carvings in miniature, these panels are comparatively larger. The Ramayana is sculpted on the south side wall on seventy panels, with the story proceeding quite unusually, in anti-clockwise direction. On the north side wall, all depictions are clockwise, a norm in Hoysala architectural articulation. Twenty five panels depict the life of the Hindu god Krishna and the remaining forty five panels depict scenes from the epic Mahabharata.

Ruvari Mallitamma, the well known sculptor and architect is known to have started his career here working on the domed ceilings in the main mantapa.

The large stone inscription near the porch contains poems composed by medieval Kannada poet Janna who had the honorific Kavichakravarti (lit, "emperor among poets").

== Gallery ==
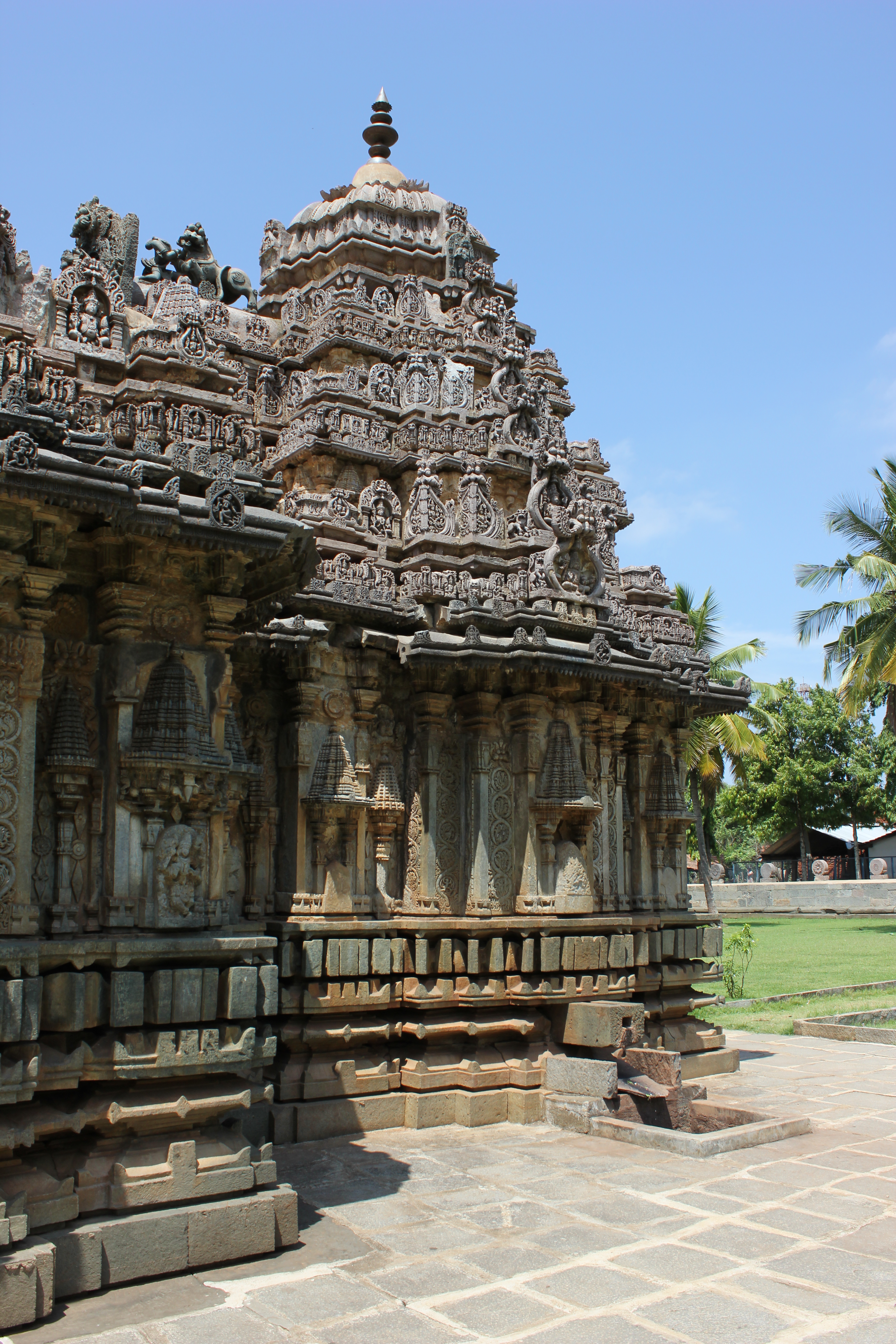
Profile of shrine outer wall with Shikara (tower) at Amrutesvara temple, Amruthapura

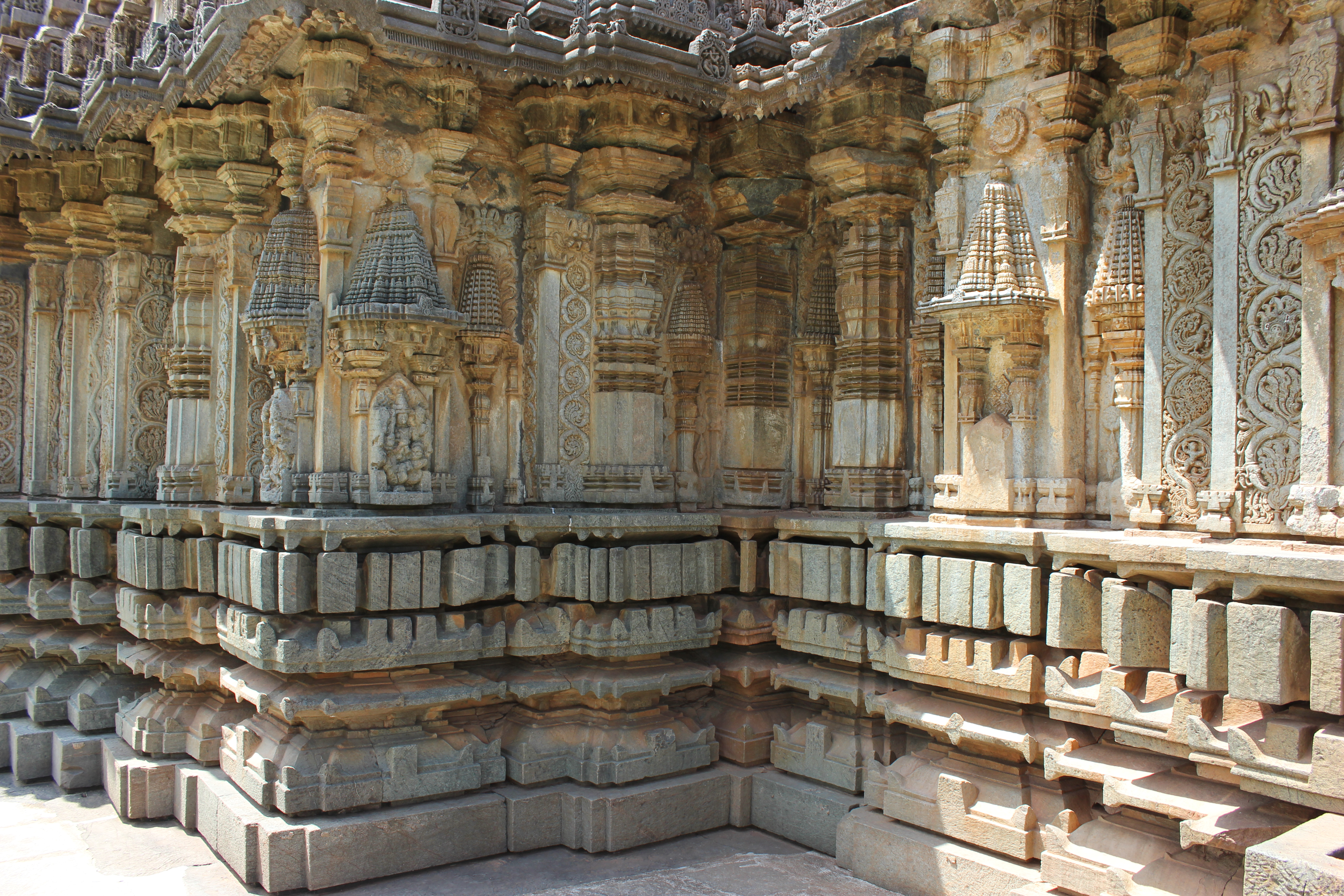
Close up of mantapa wall with miniature decorative towers, swirls and flourish in relief at Amrutesvara temple, Amruthapura

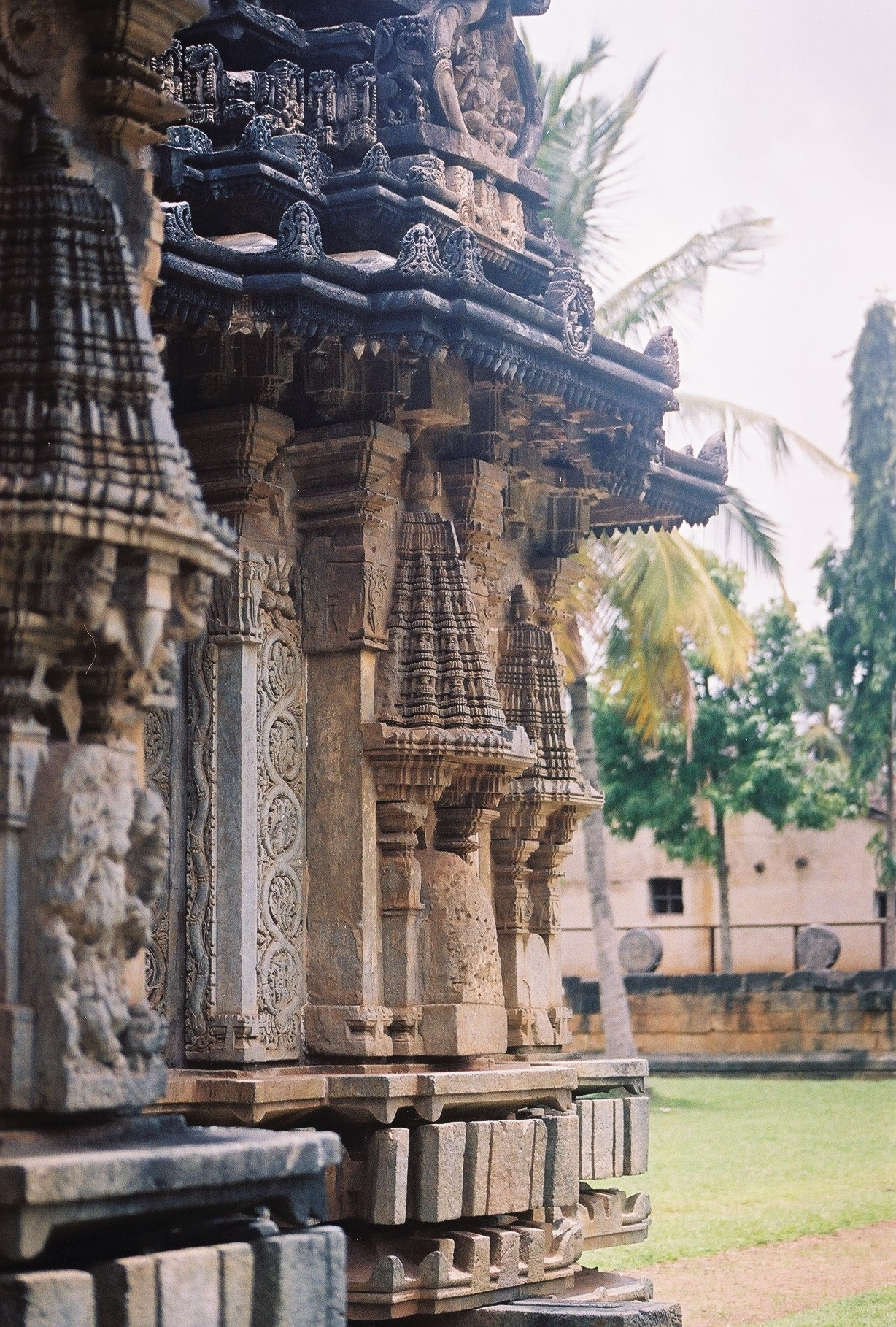
Mantapa wall with miniature decorative towers (aedicule) in relief at Amrutesvara temple, Amruthapura

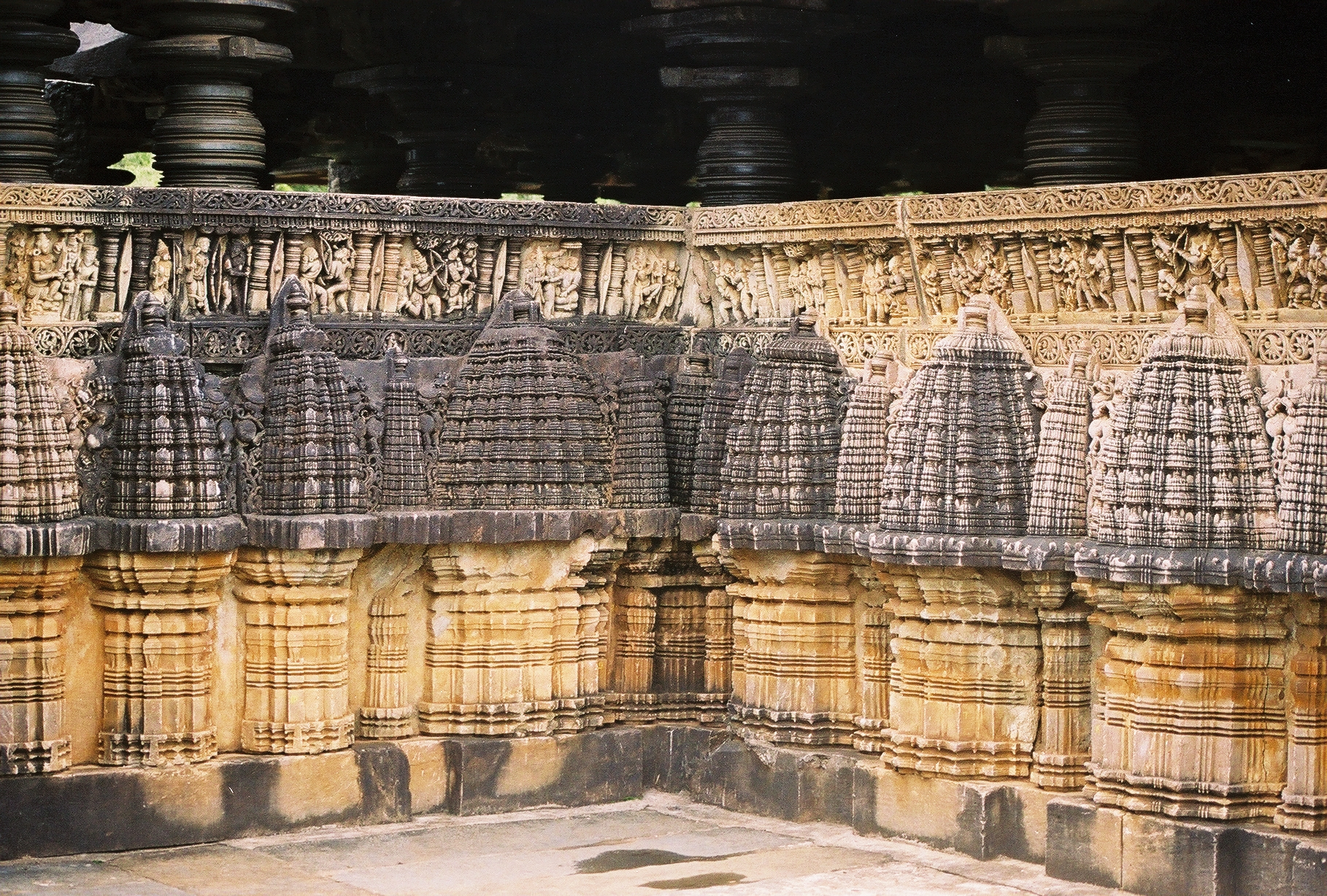
Wall relief at Amrutesvara temple, Amruthapura

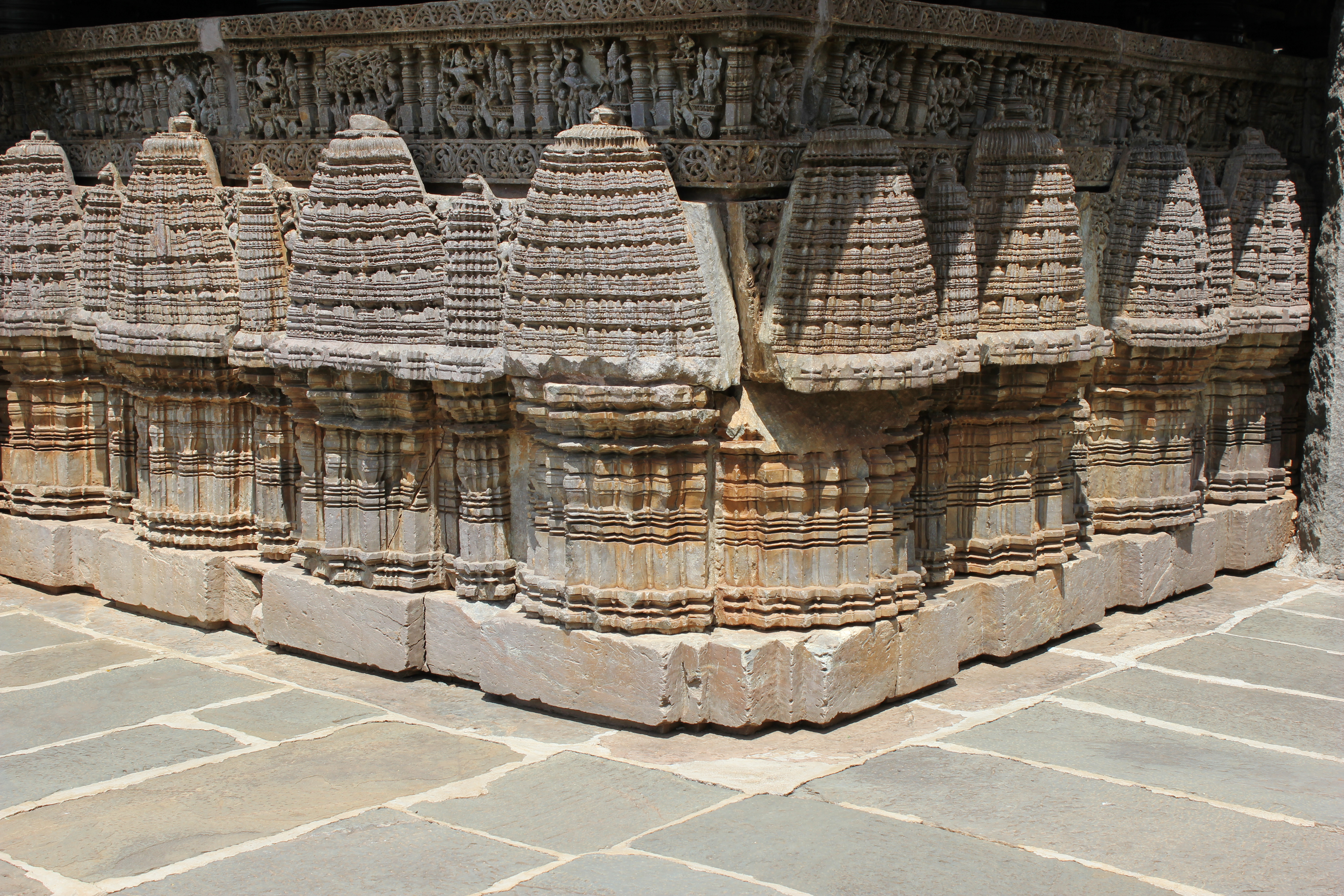
Wall relief at Amrutesvara temple, Amruthapura

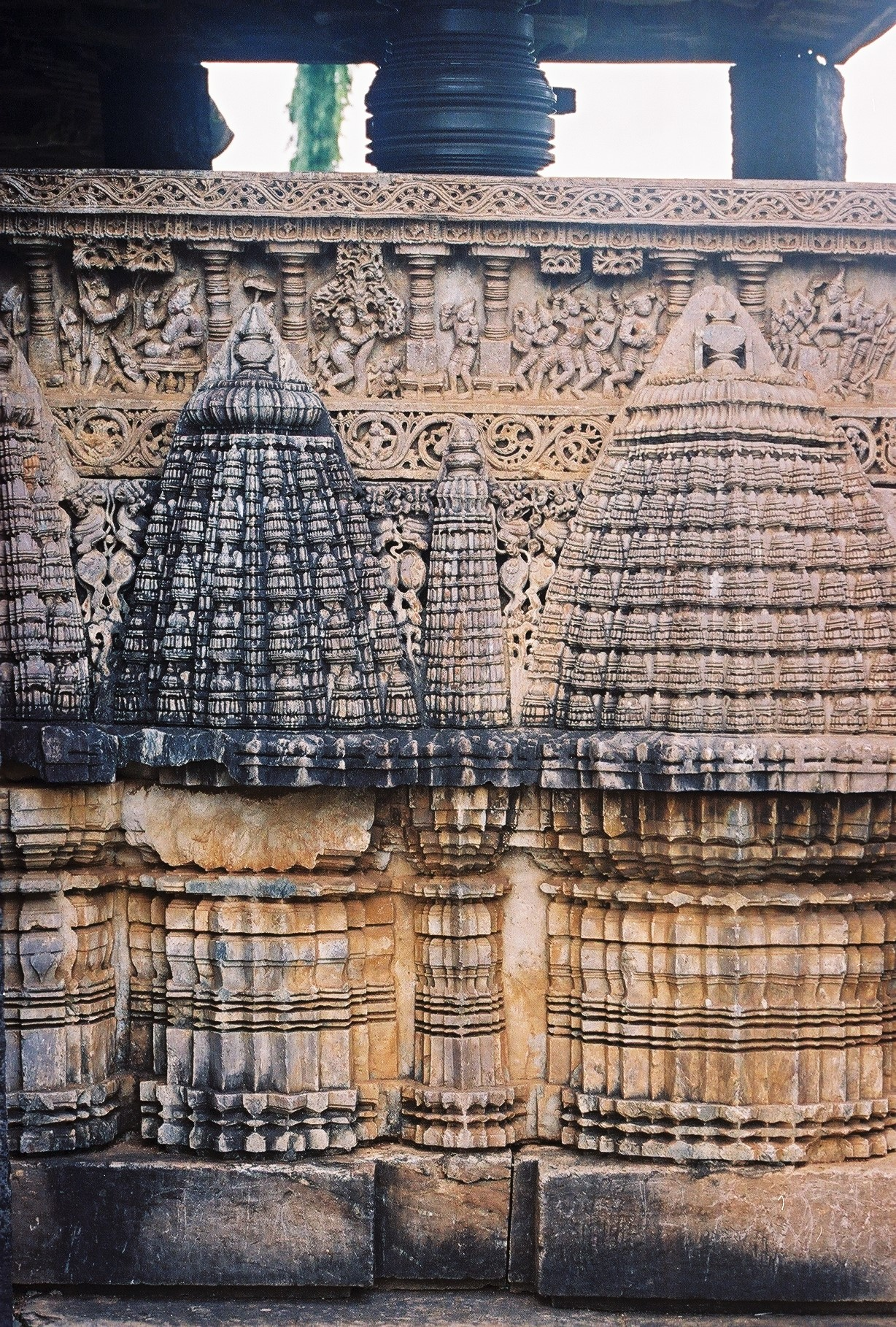
Close up of wall relief at Amrutesvara temple, Amruthapura

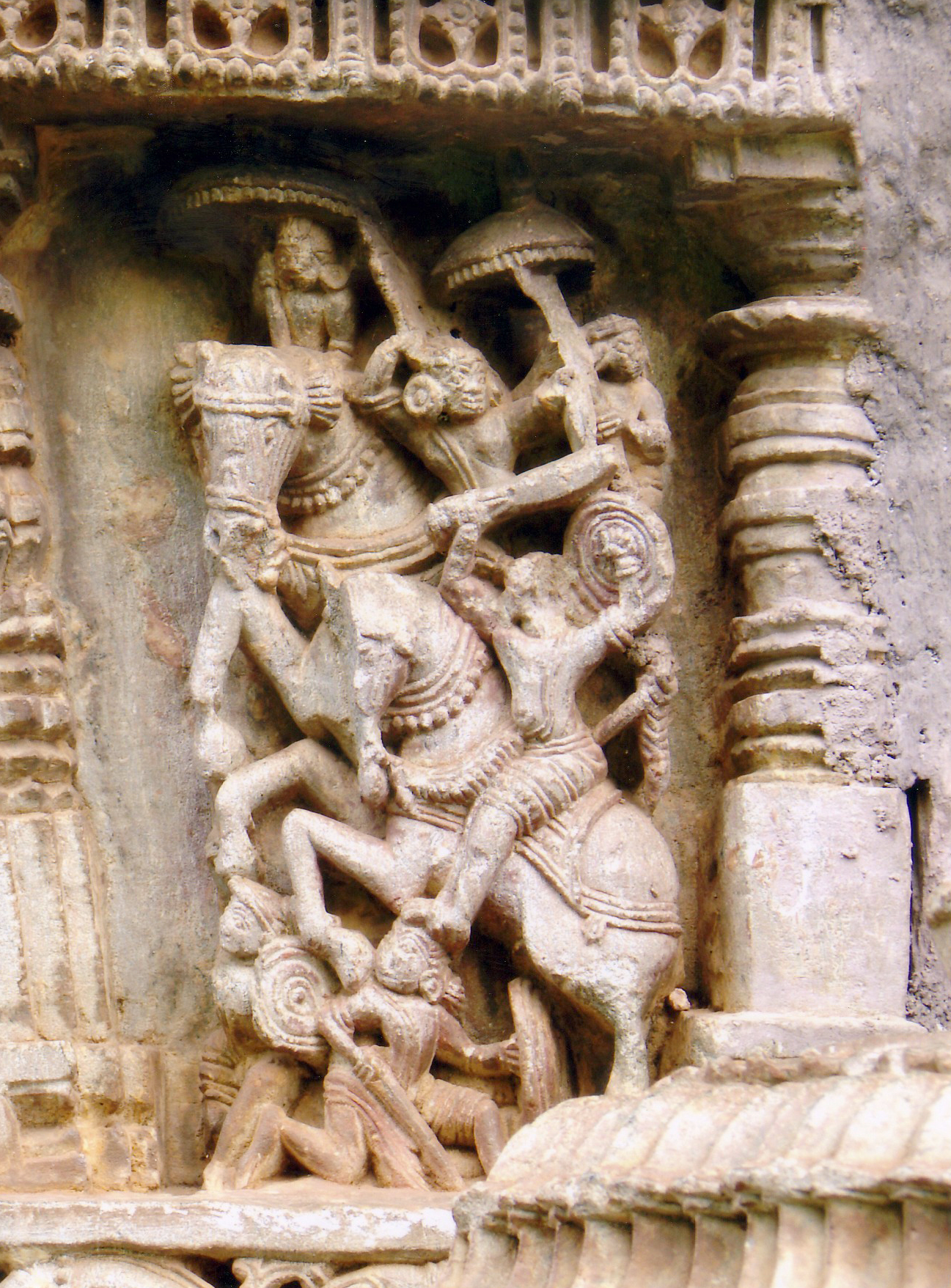
Wall relief sculpture of the Amrutesvara temple

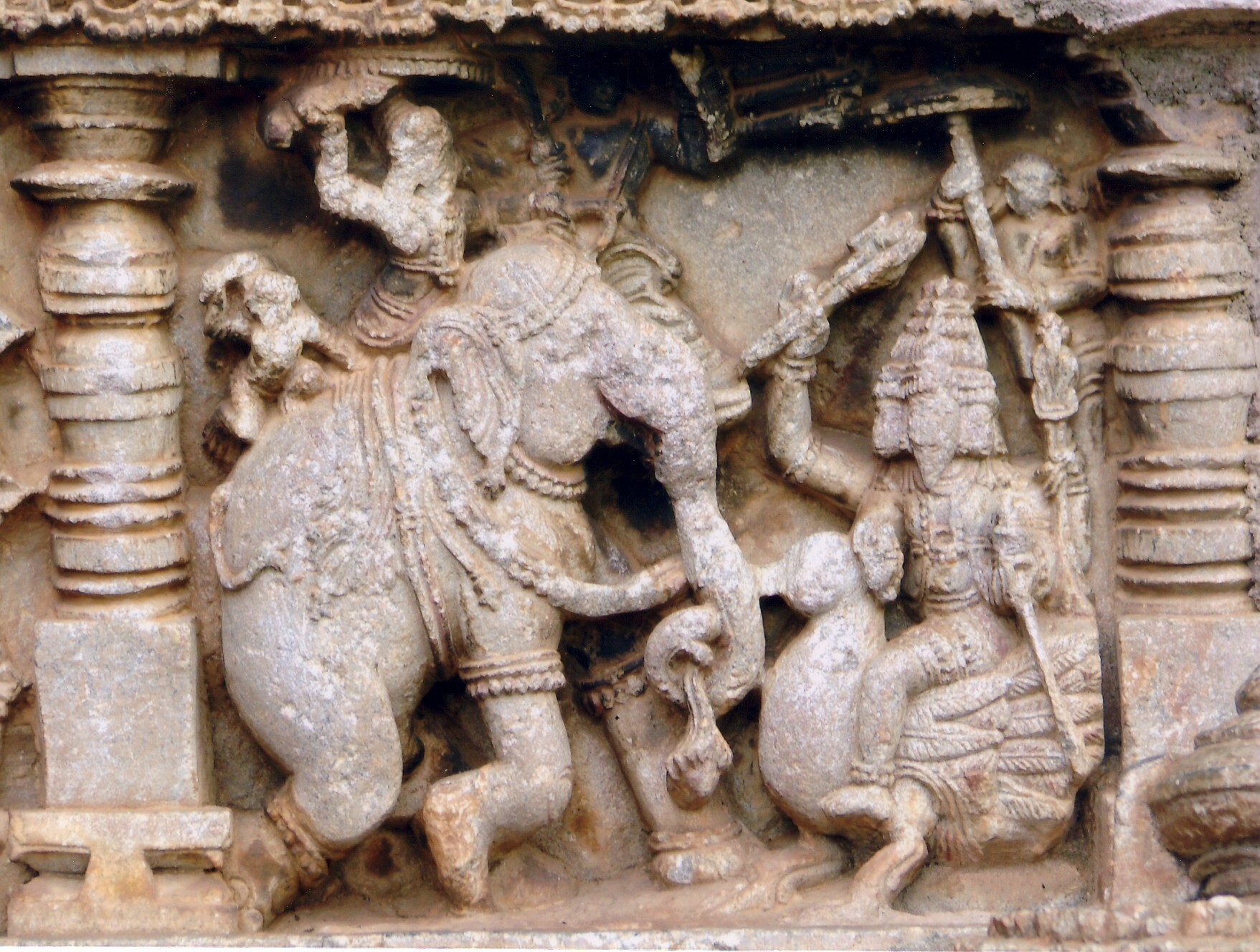
Wall relief sculpture at the Amrutesvara temple, Amruthapura

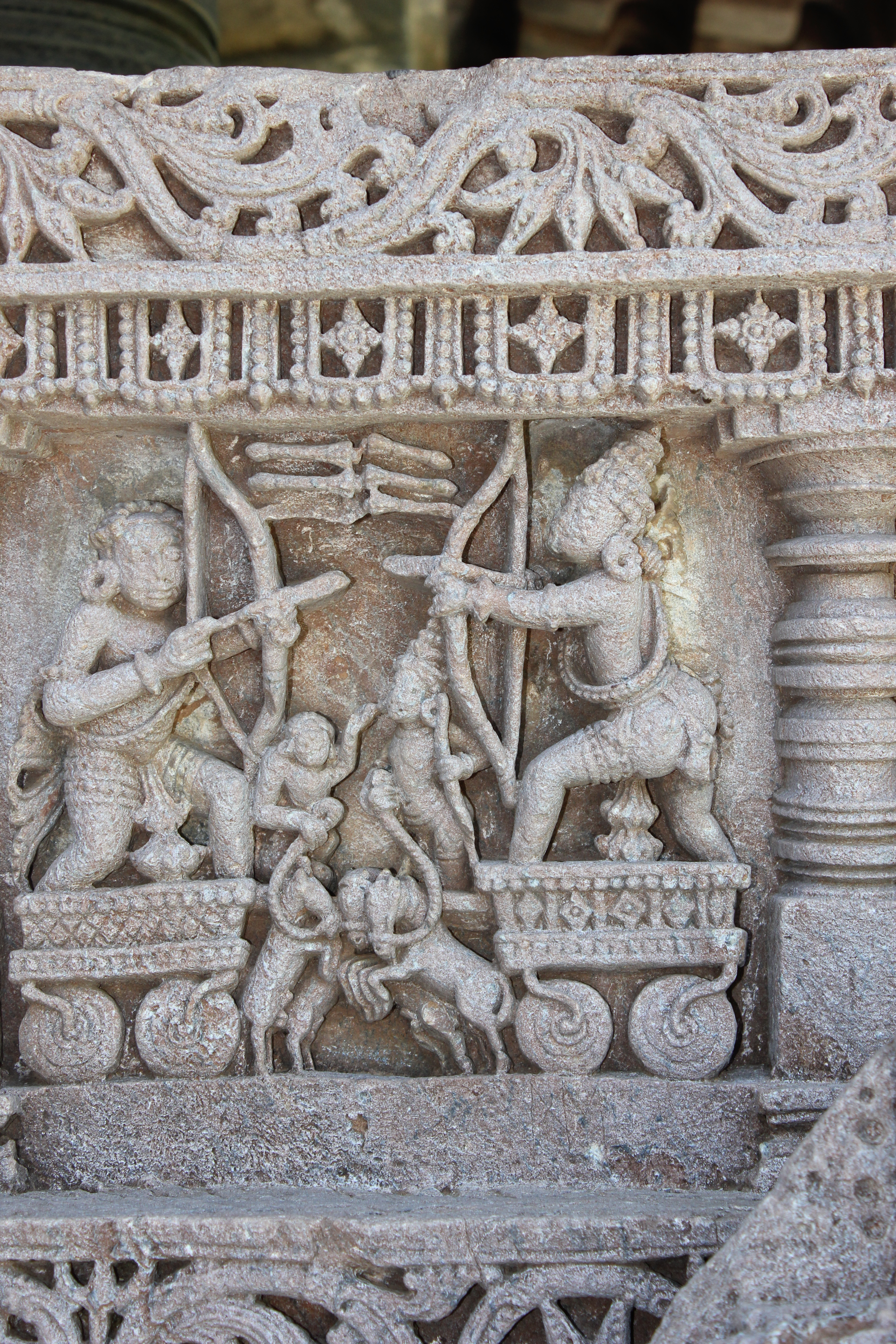
Wall relief sculpture at Amrutesvara temple, Amruthapura

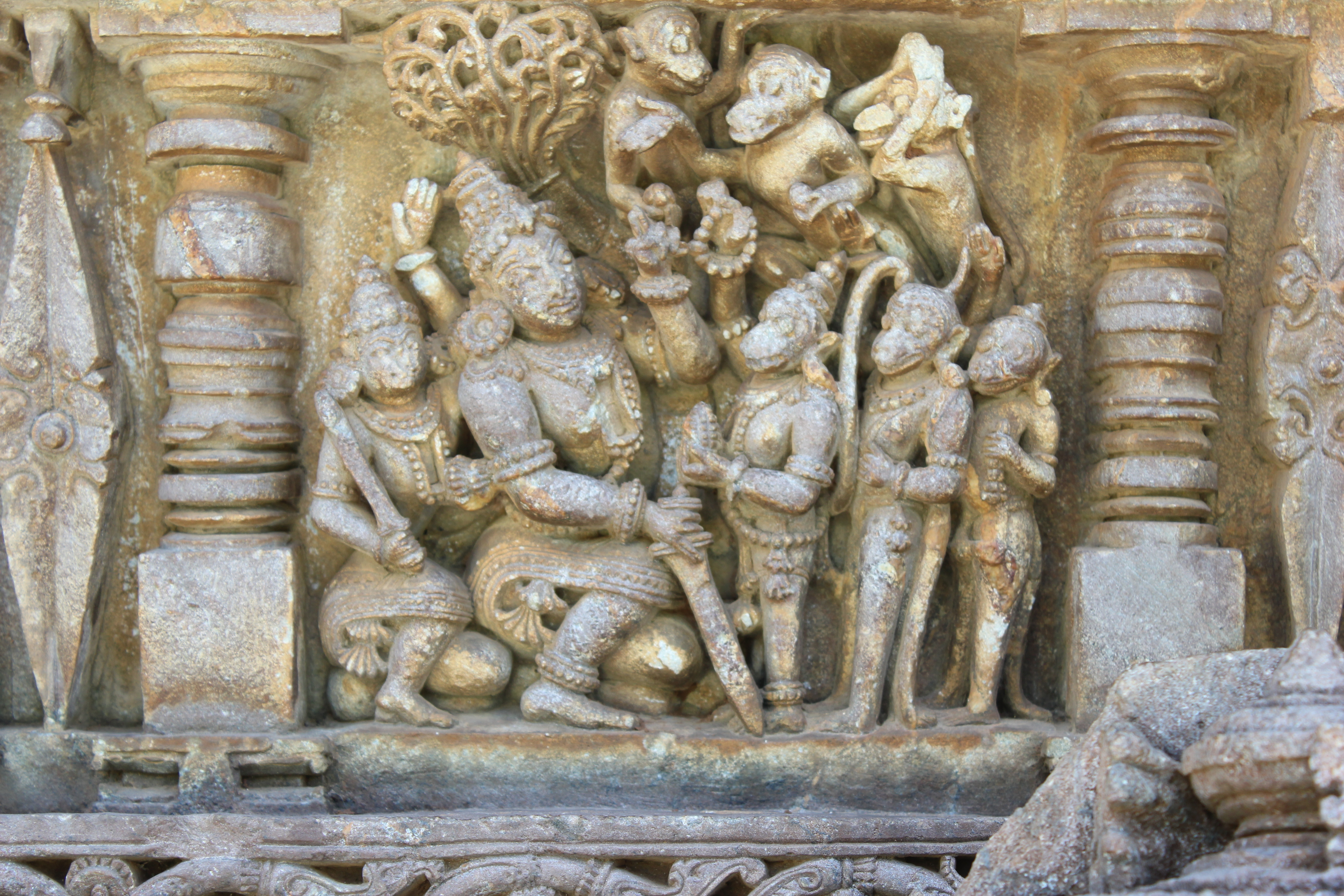
Wall relief sculpture at Amrutesvara temple, Amruthapura

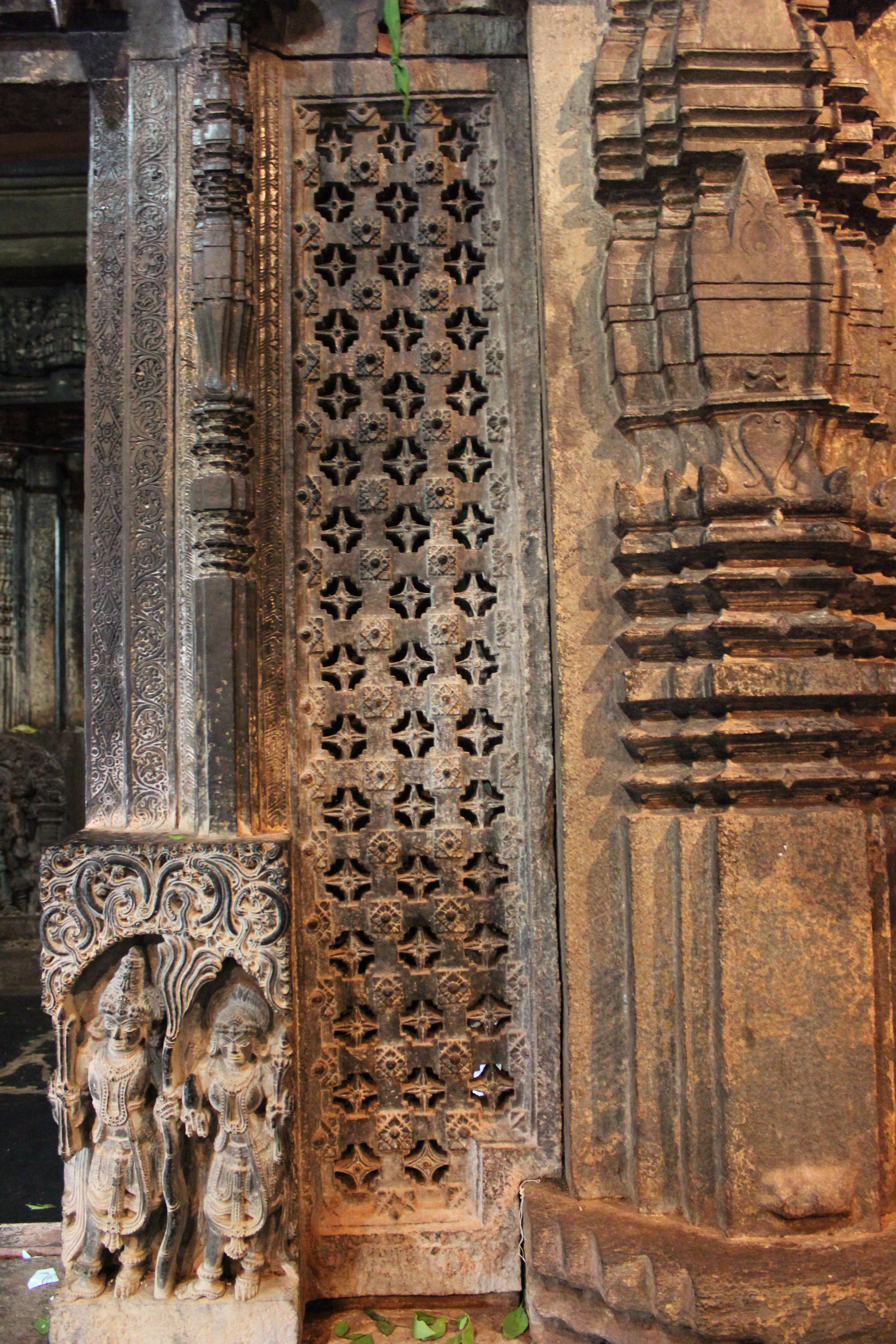
Perforated window art at Amrutesvara temple, Amruthapura

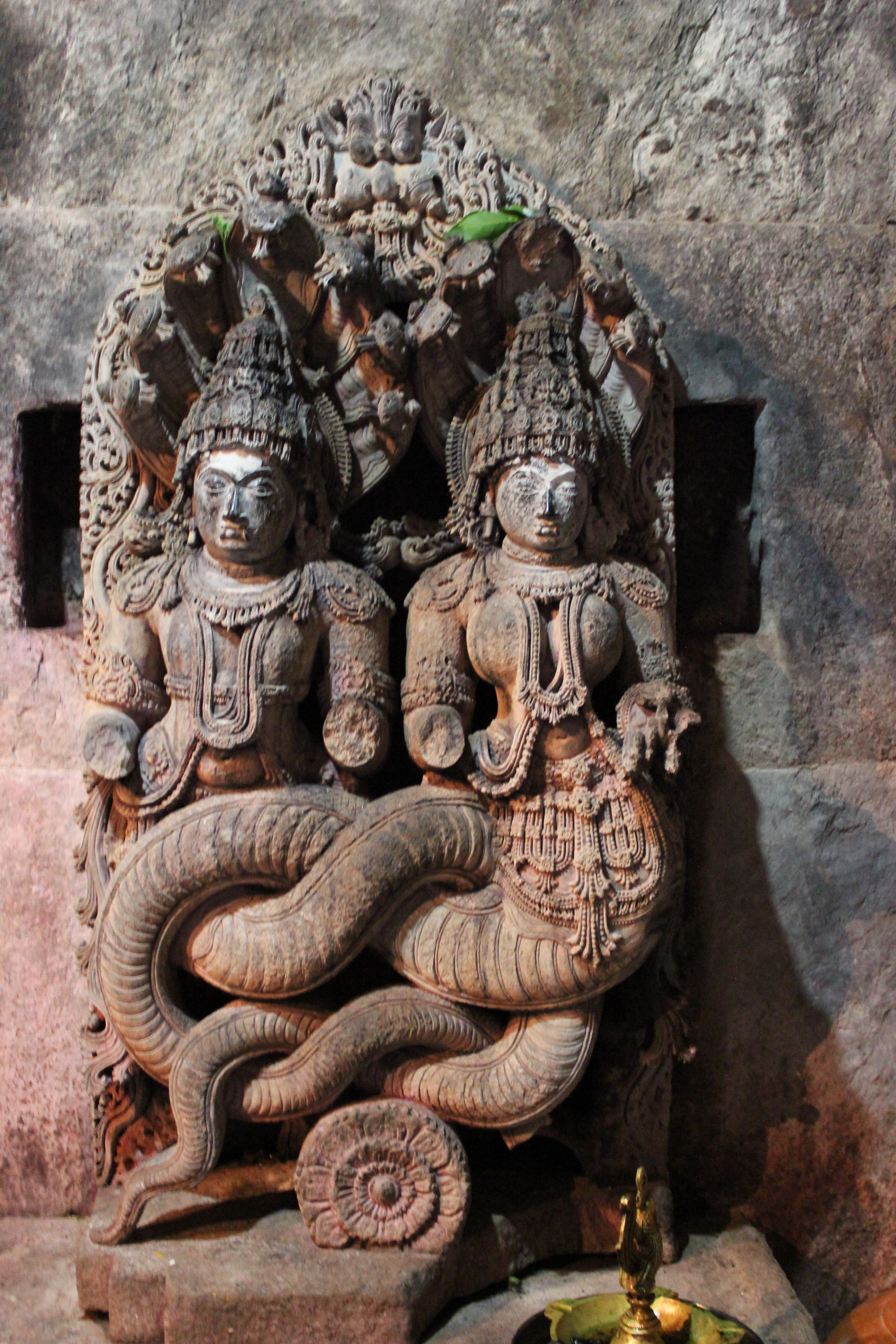
Hindu deity sculpture at Amrutesvara temple, Amruthapura

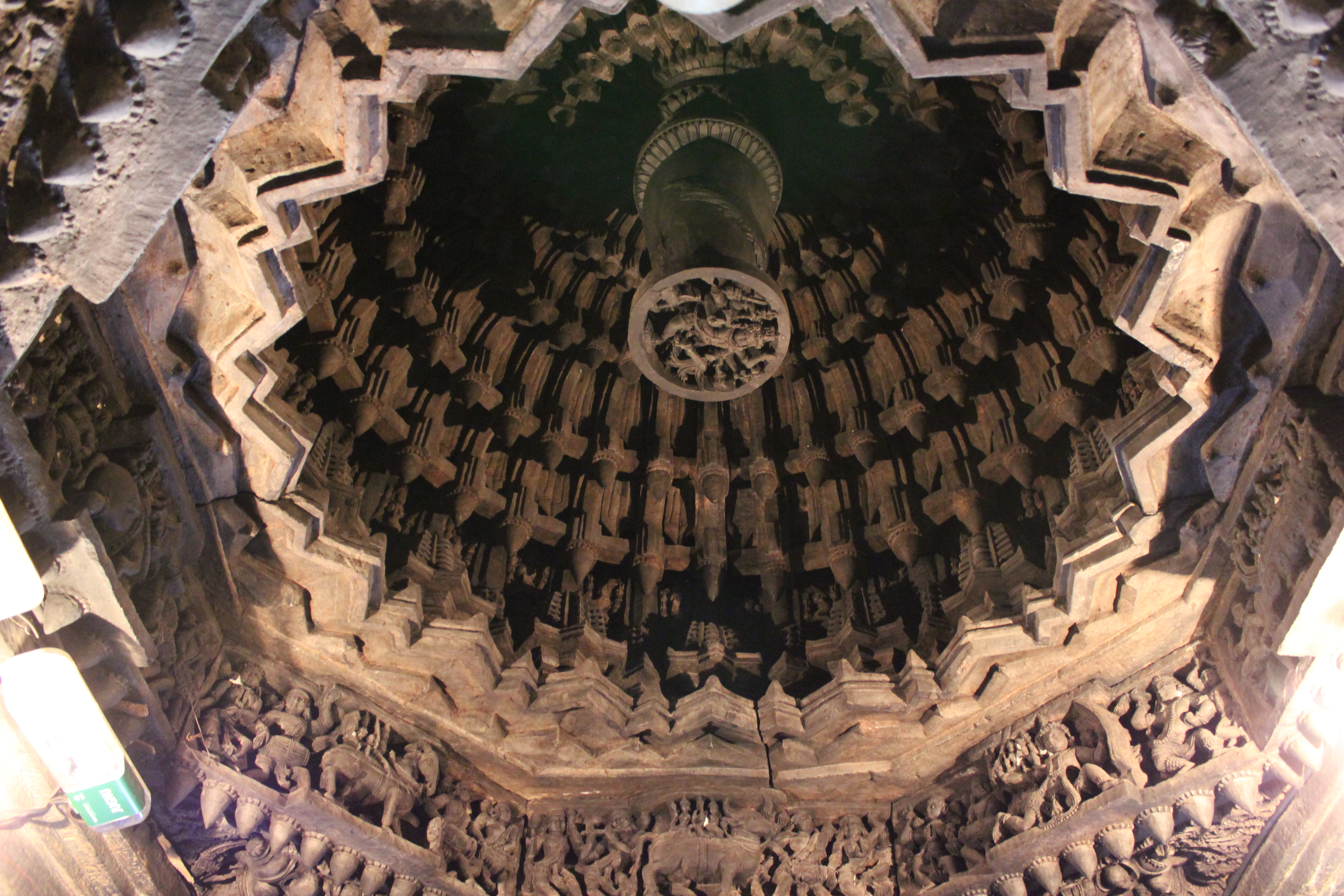
Domical ceiling art at Amrutesvara temple, Amruthapura

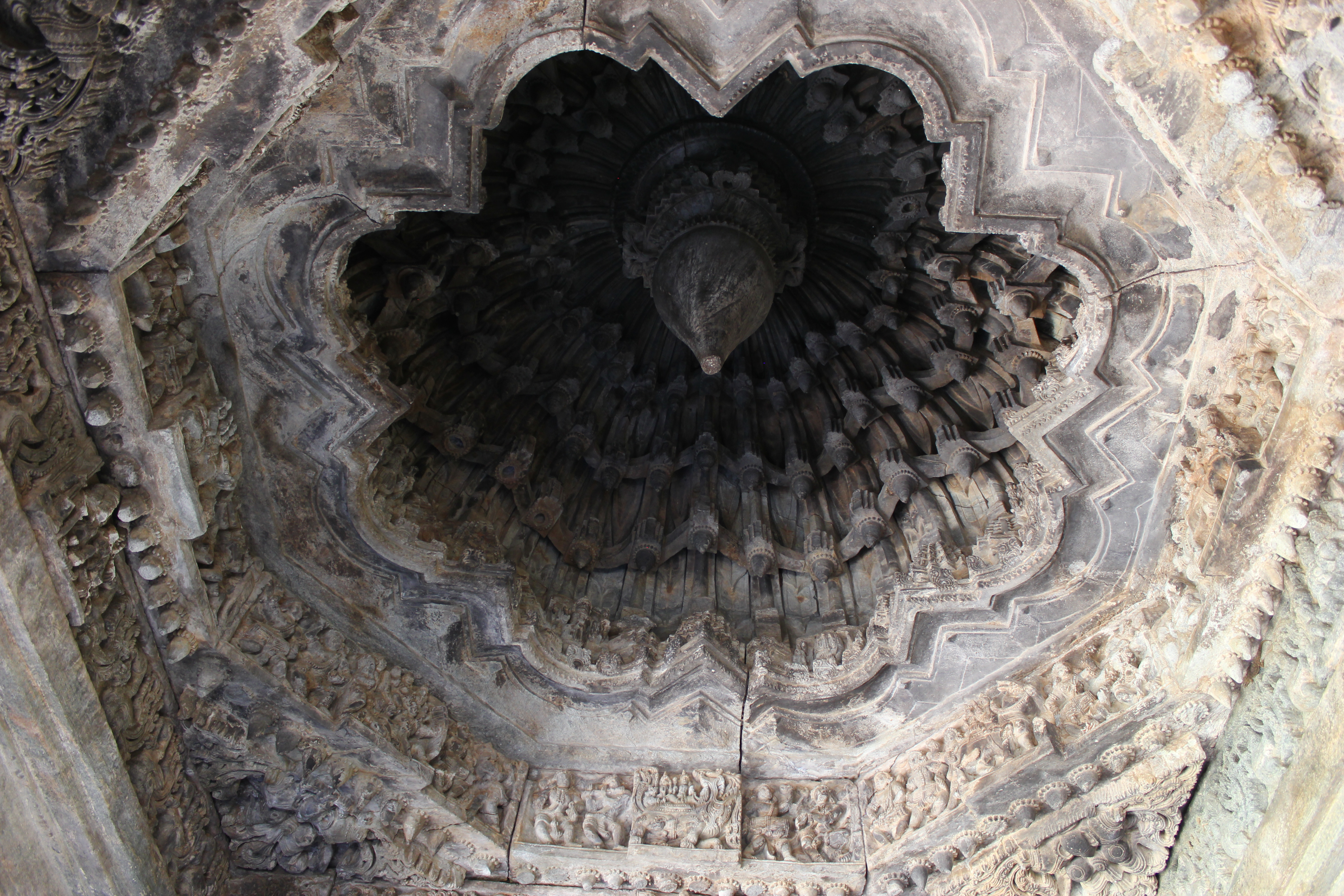
Domical ceiling art at Amrutesvara temple, Amruthapura

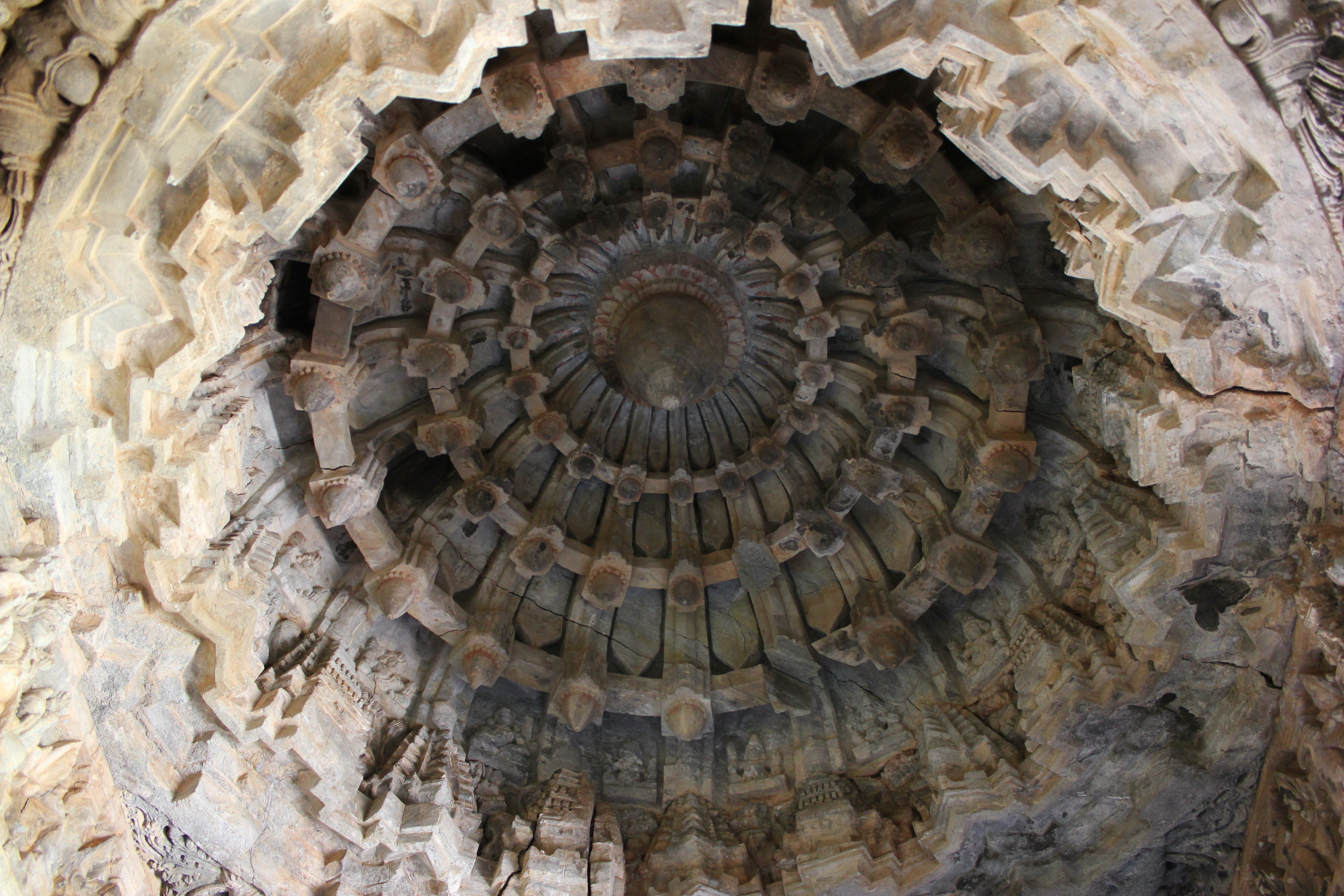
Domical ceiling art at Amrutesvara temple, Amruthapura

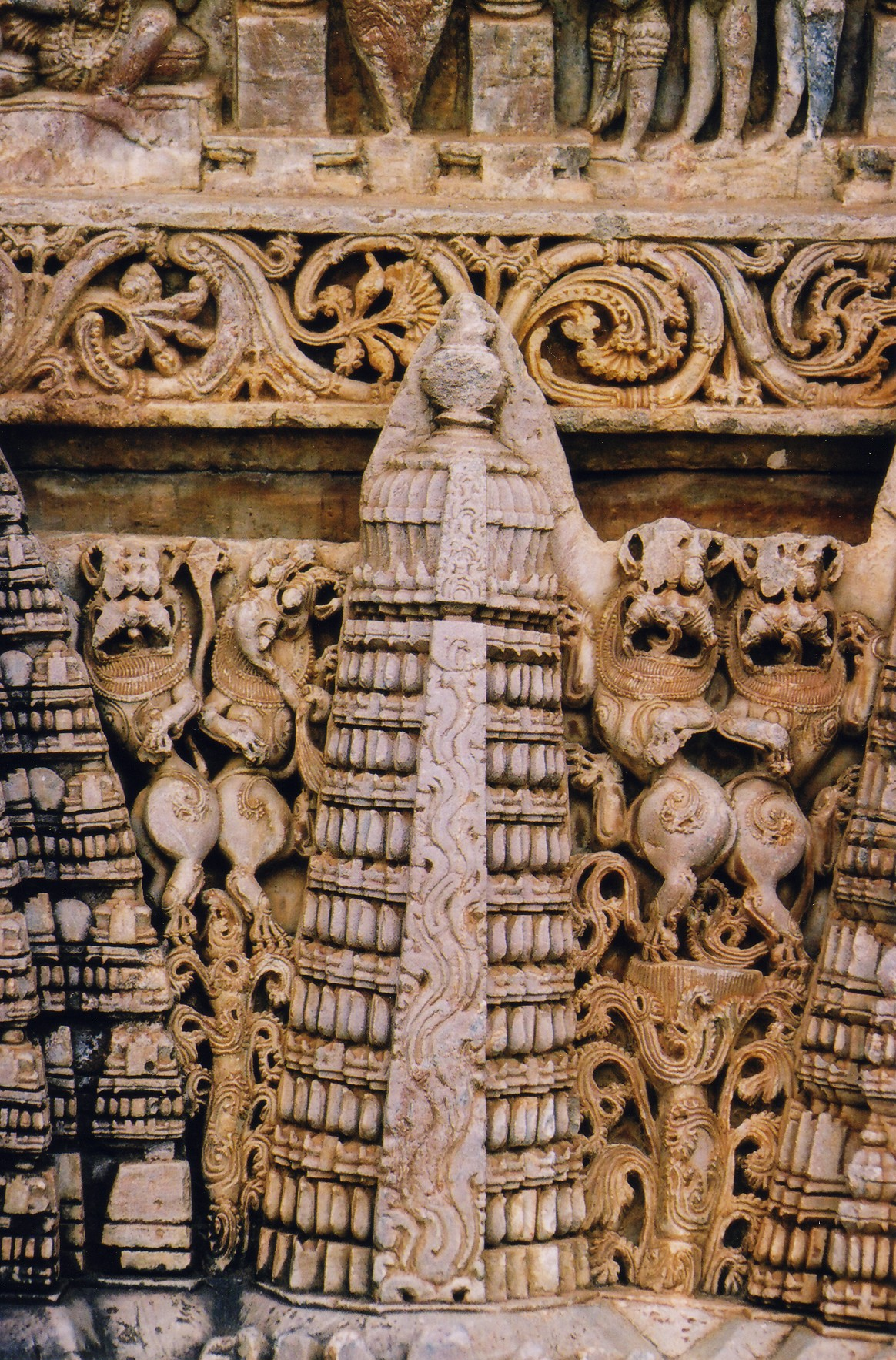
Wall relief sculpture, Amrutesvara temple

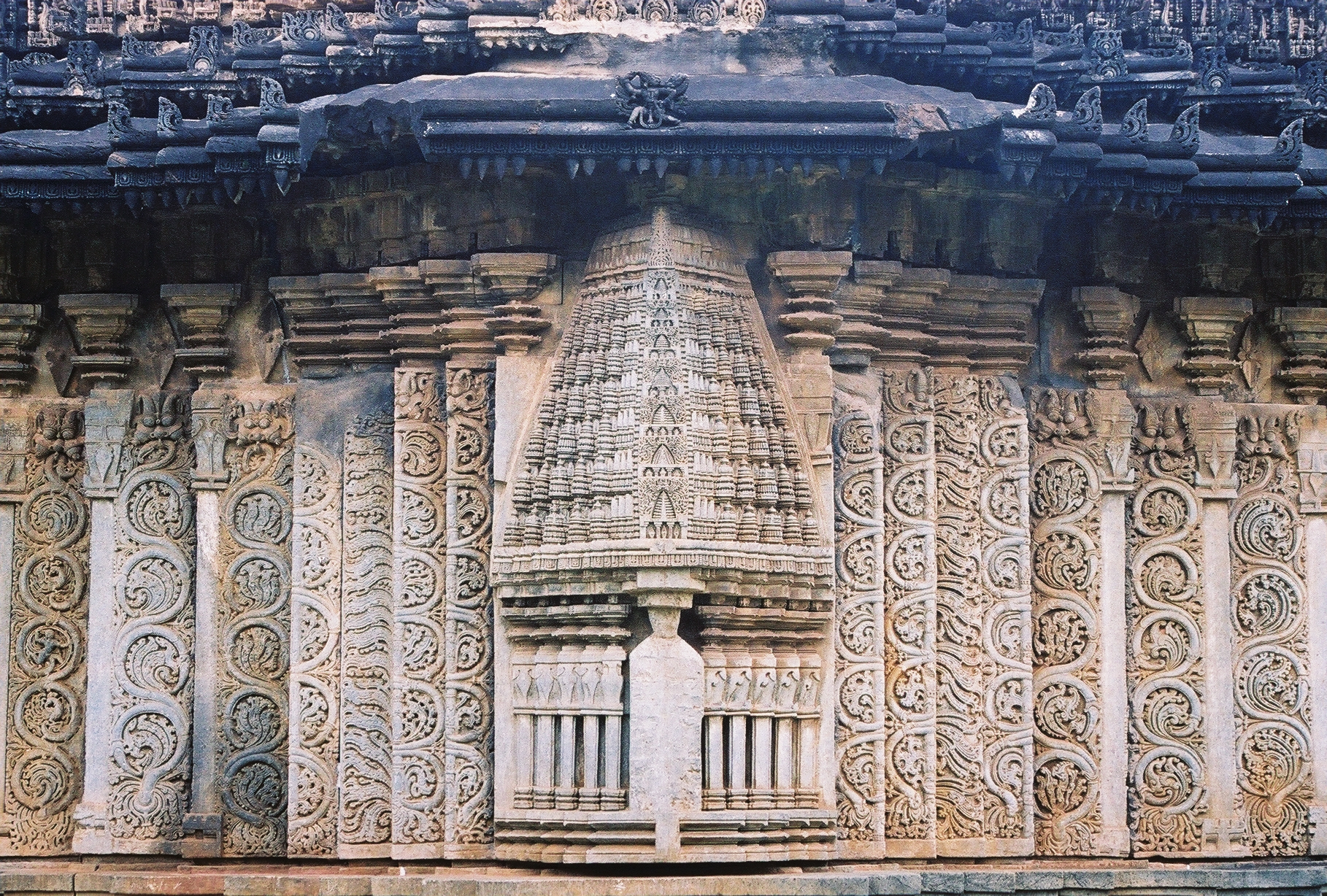
Decorative swirls in bas-relief on mantapa outer wall at Amrutesvara temple, Amruthapura

== See also ==
- Hoysala architecture
- Chikkamagaluru District
