= Belavadi =

- Village
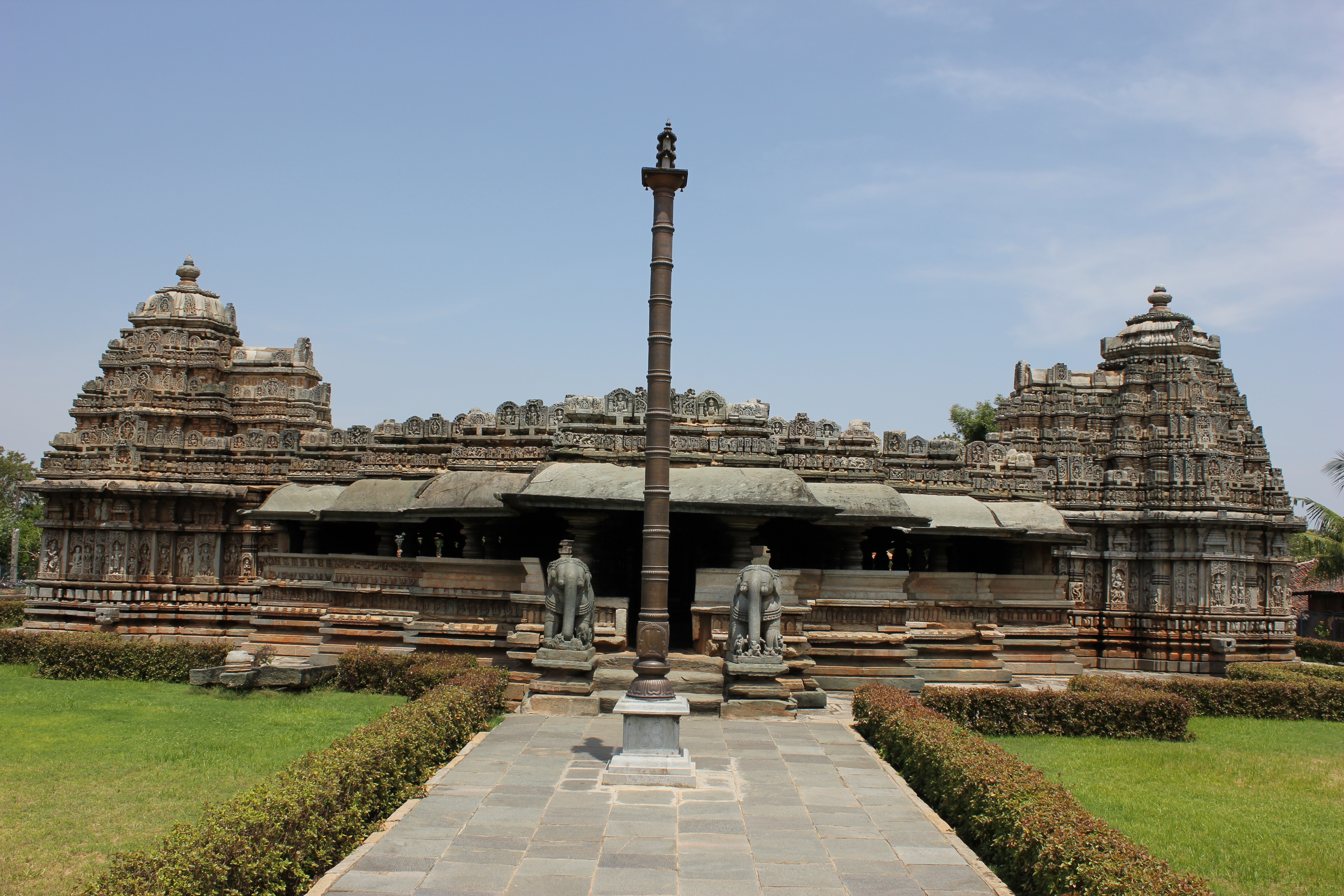
- Veeranarayana temple at Belavadi

- Location within Karnataka Location within India
- Coordinates: 13.284134°N 75.997893°E
- Country: India
- State: Karnataka
- District: Chikmagalur

Government
  - Type: Panchayati raj (India)
  - Body: Gram panchayat
- Elevation: 843 m (2,766 ft)

Population (1983)
  - Total: 2,002

Languages
  - Official: Kannada
- Time zone: UTC+5:30 (IST)
- ISO 3166 code: IN-KA
- Vehicle registration: KA
- Nearest city: Chikmagalur
- Website: karnataka.gov.in

Belavadi is a village, located at a distance of 29 km from Chikmagalur town and about 12 km from Halebidu, Karnataka, India. The place is described as Ekachakranagara of Mahabharata and the village is known for Veeranarayana temple of Hoysala architecture.

== Description ==
A festival called Bandi-Bana is celebrated annually by villagers in memory of Bhima killing Bakasura. There is a big tank ascribed to one Dhanakaraya, a local chief in whose honor a temple has also been constructed on the bank. It was originally a Jaina centre. later Krishnaraja Wadiyar II gave this village as a grant to the Sringeri Matha.

The Veera Narayana Temple, Belavadi temple is one of the unique Hoysala monuments. The hoysala temple is in trikutachala form and is located at that village centre. The main presiding deity is veeranaryana along with yoga narasimha and kolalu gopala. This kolalu gopala is a beautiful statue in India according to archaeological dept of India. On 23 March (when day and night are of 12 hours each) every year sun light directly enters the sanctum sanctorum of Veeranarayana temple.

There is a Ganapati temple and the main deity is variously known as Huttada (ant hill) Ganapati, Udhbhava Ganapati and Varada (boon) Ganapati. This temple is being maintained by Sringeri Matha and also a free high school is run by the mutt where free mid-day meal is given to students.

Near this temple is another temple of Shankareshwara. The ruined temple of Basaveshwara has been reconstructed recently. The other temples of Belavadi are Beeredevru, Kariyamma and Bindigamma.
