= Veera Narayana Temple, Belavadi =

Hindu temple in Karnataka, India

Viranarayana temple, Belavadi
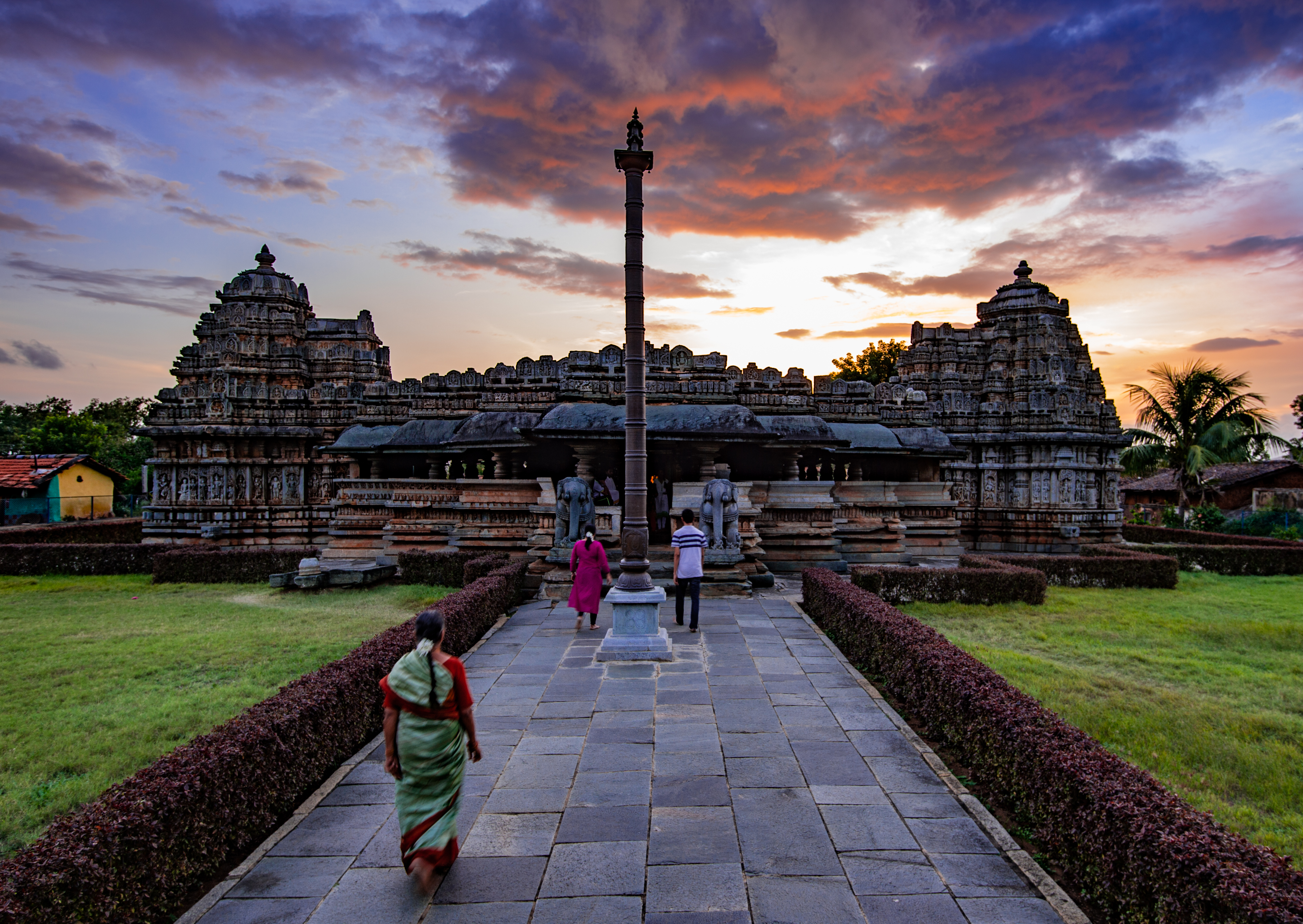

- Location within India Location within Karnataka

Religion
- Affiliation: Hinduism
- District: Chikkamagaluru
- Deity: Vishnu

Location
- Location: Belvadi village
- State: Karnataka
- Country: India
- Coordinates: 13°16′55.1″N 75°59′45.9″E

Architecture
- Type: Hoysala
- Creator: Veera Ballala II
- Completed: c. 1200 CE

The Veera Narayana temple, also referred to as the Viranarayana temple of Belavadi, is a triple Hindu temple with a complex Hoysala architecture completed around 1200 CE. Close to Halebidu, this is a better preserved large Hoysala monument found in the small village of Belavadi, Chikkamagaluru district of Karnataka, India.

The temple has three separate square sanctums connected through an unusually large square ranga-mandapa (103 feet). The main shrine faces east and is dedicated to Viranarayana (Vishnu). The north facing shrine is dedicated to Gopala, while the south facing shrine is for Yoga-Narasimha. The temple was likely expanded in stages before it was damaged in the 14th-century, and some features were added to protect it from further destruction. The notable features of this stellate-style temple include its exquisitely ornamented Vesara superstructures (shikara) with jewelry-like details. Inside are the finely polished galaxy of pillars, some banded as if they are wearing jewels. The ceilings too are unusual panels of figural tableaux depicting Hindu legends about Krishna.

The Veeranarayana temple is a nationally protected monument of India that is managed by the Archaeological Survey of India Bengaluru Circle.

== Location and date ==
Belavadi is 11 kilometres (7 mi) north of Halebidu, about 40 kilometres (25 mi) north of Hassan city, and about 29 kilometres (18 mi) southeast of Chikmagalur town on the Chikmagalur-Javagal highway. It is connected to India's national highway network via NH 73. The local legends state that the village has roots in the Mahabharata era when it was called Ekachakranagar. Then, Belavadi was where Pandava prince Bheema killed the demon Bakasura and protected the village and its people.

The shrines of Veeranarayana were likely built and expanded over many years, because the slightly newer sections has somewhat lesser height, the way the halls connect, and because the cross section plane of the additions is visible. The oldest section is the shrine for Veeranarayana, likely complete about 1200 CE. Thereafter, the temple was expanded where the supersized ranga-mandapa was added along with the shrines for Gopala and Yoga-Narasimha. These were complete by about 1206 CE or few years thereafter.

== Architecture ==
This ornate trikuta (three shrined) temple was built in 1200 CE by Hoysala Empire King Veera Ballala II. The material used is Soapstone. Each of the three shrines has a complete superstructure (tower on top of shrine) and is one of the largest temples built by the Hoysala kings. While the famous temples at Belur and Halebidu are known for their intricate sculptures, this temple is known for its architecture.

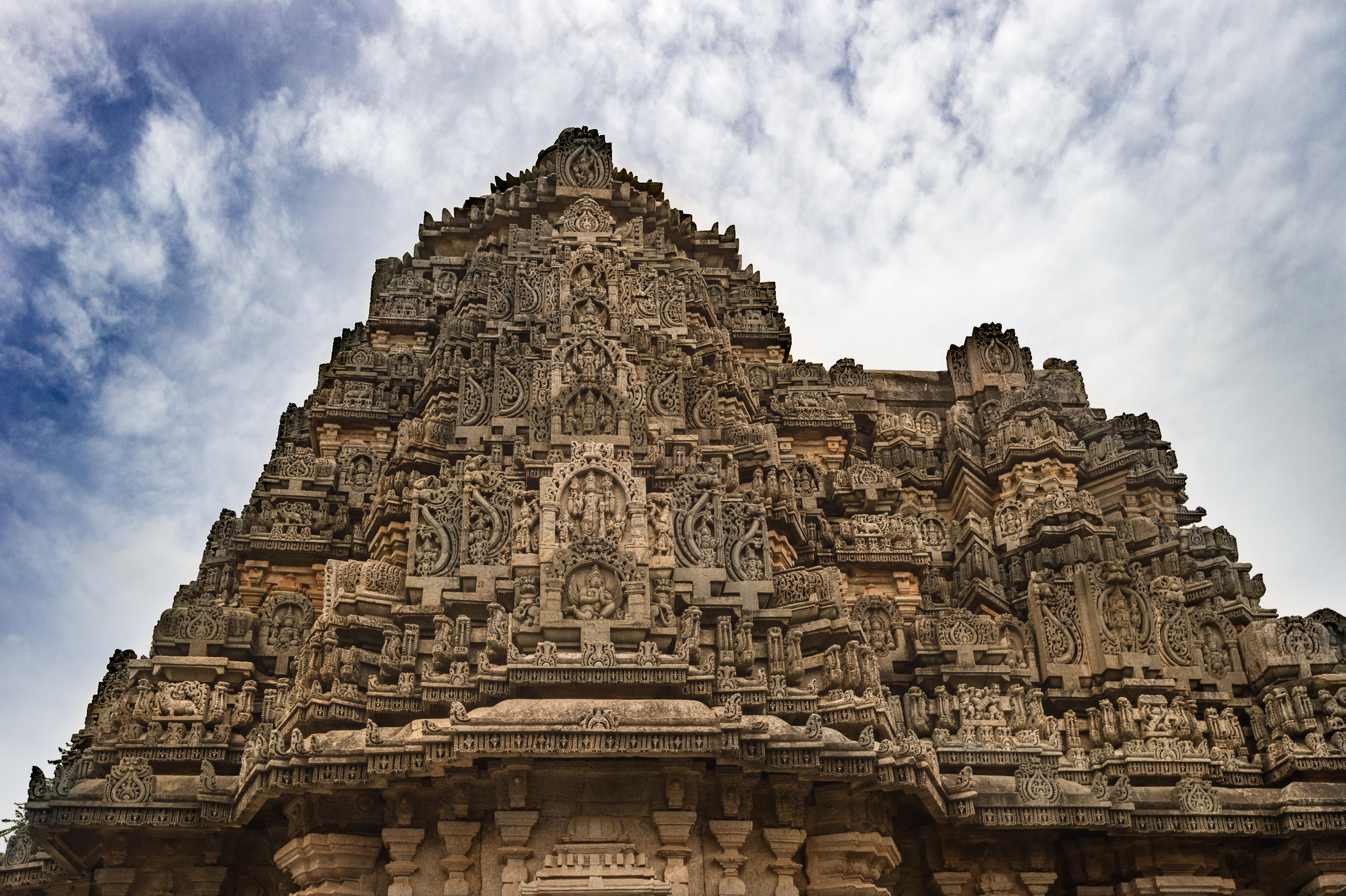
The artwork on the shikara on Yoga-Narasimha vimana

The plan of the temple is unique in that two of the shrines face each other and are located on either side of a wide and spacious open mantapa (hall) containing thirty seven bays. The temple complex has two closed mantapas, one with thirteen bays and another with nine bays, at the end of which is a central shrine. This third shrine is an older construction and exhibits a standard architectural idiom containing all the basic elements of a Hoysala temple. The inner walls of the older shrine are plain, but its roof is well decorated. In all, the temple complex has fifty nine bays (hence it has many pillars), most of which are lathe-turned and bell shaped, while a few have decorative carvings on them. According to Foekema, the outer wall of the temple is of the "old style", with one eaves running around the temple where the superstructure meets the wall of the shrine. Below this are miniature decorative towers on pilasters (aedicule). This is followed by a second eves. A panel of Hindu deities and their attendants (frieze) are below this eves followed by a set of five moldings that form the base of the wall.

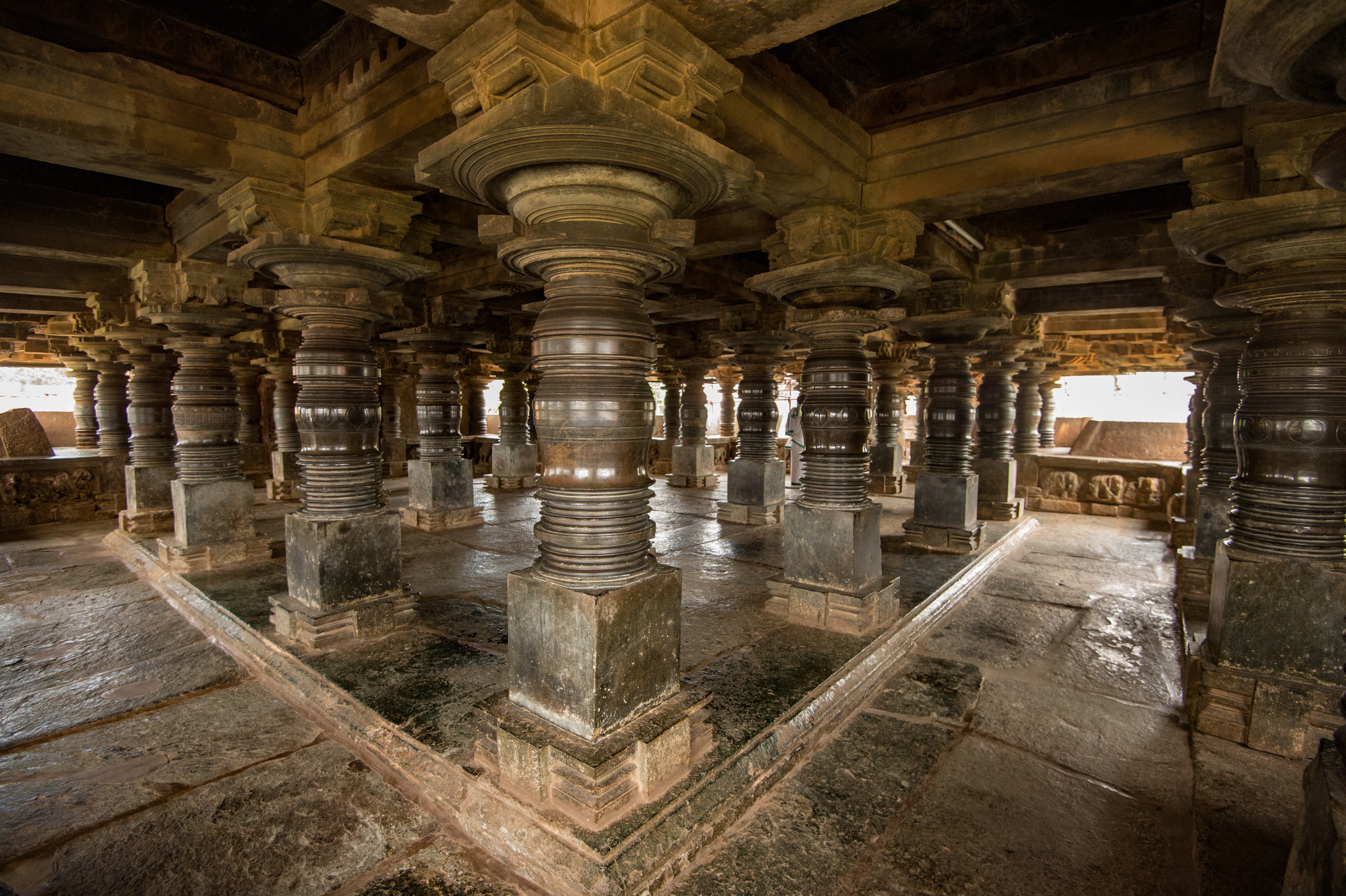
Lathe turned pillars in the ranga-mantapa between the Venugopala and Yoga Narasimha shrines.

The two newer shrines have different plans. Both have a square sanctum, with one shrine square in shape as well while the other is star shaped (stellate). The tower of the shrine has the traditional Hindu kalasha (decorative water-pot like structure) below which are three tiers of decorated miniature roofs. The superstructure over each of three shrines is connected to a low protrusion tower called Sukanasi (tower over the vestibule, called "nose" of the main tower) The Sukanasi consist of two tiers of decorated miniature roofs. In all other aspects the two shrines are identical. All shrines have sculptured decoration on the towers, and the sculptures on the walls are bold and are visible from a distance. However, they are not sharp and impressive from close quarters unlike in other Hoysala temples. The important sculptures with fine finish are that of the Hindu god Krishna dancing on the head of Kalia the serpent, and the Garuda (eagle).

This is a Vaishnava temple and all three shrines have images of the Hindu god Vishnu, though in different forms (avatar). The central shrine (older shrine) has an 8 ft (2.4 m) tall image of Narayana with four hands and is considered one of the best examples of Hoysala art. It is well elaborated with ornamentation and stands on a padmasana (lotus seat). The southern shrine has an 8 ft (2.4 m) tall image of Venugopala (the god Krishna playing a flute) including a garuda pedestal and the northern shrine has a 7 ft (2.1 m) tall image of Yoganarasimha, sitting in a yoga posture. Decorative sculptures such as kirtimukhas are used to make the shrine (vimana) towers ornate.

== Gallery ==
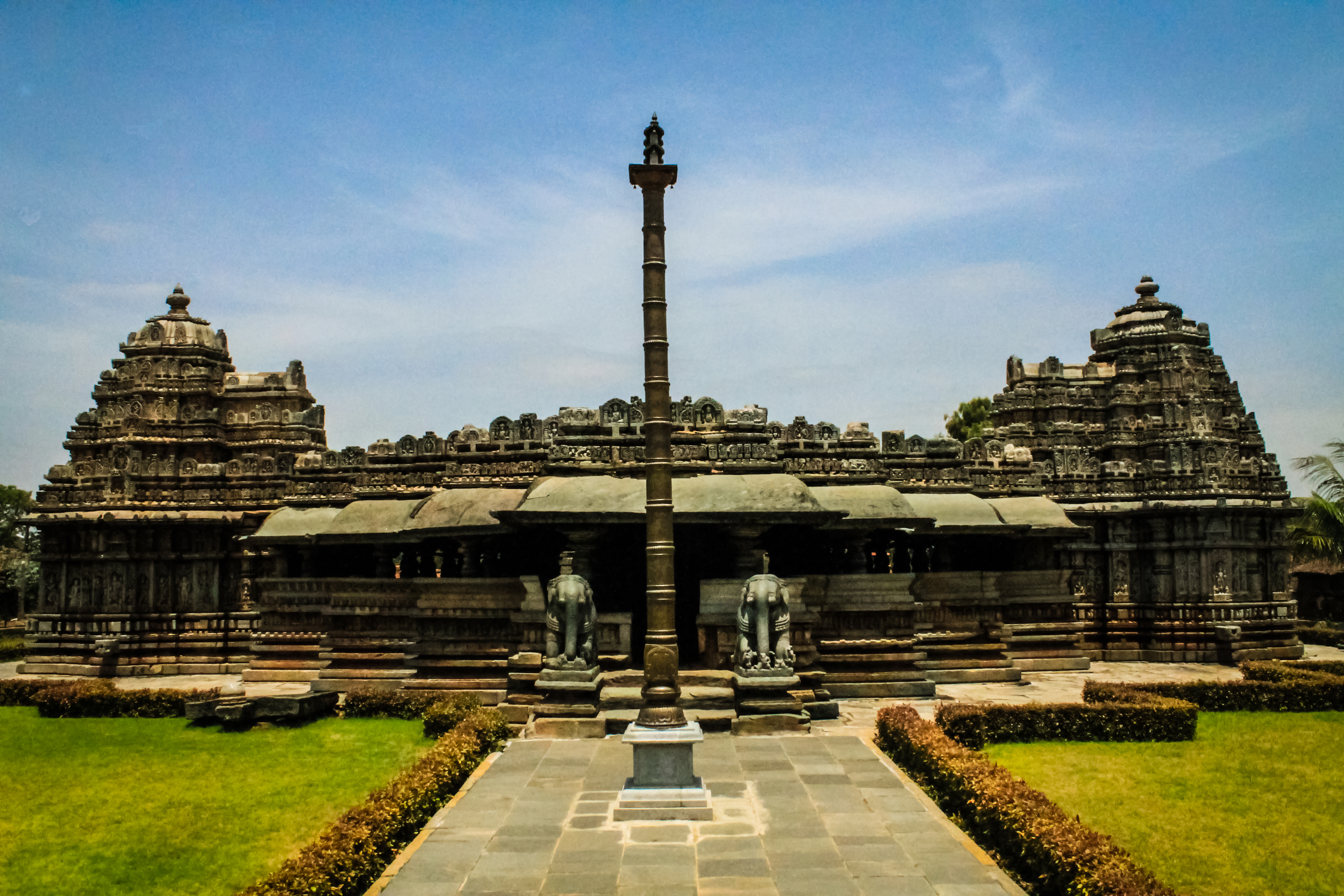
The temple view from its entrance

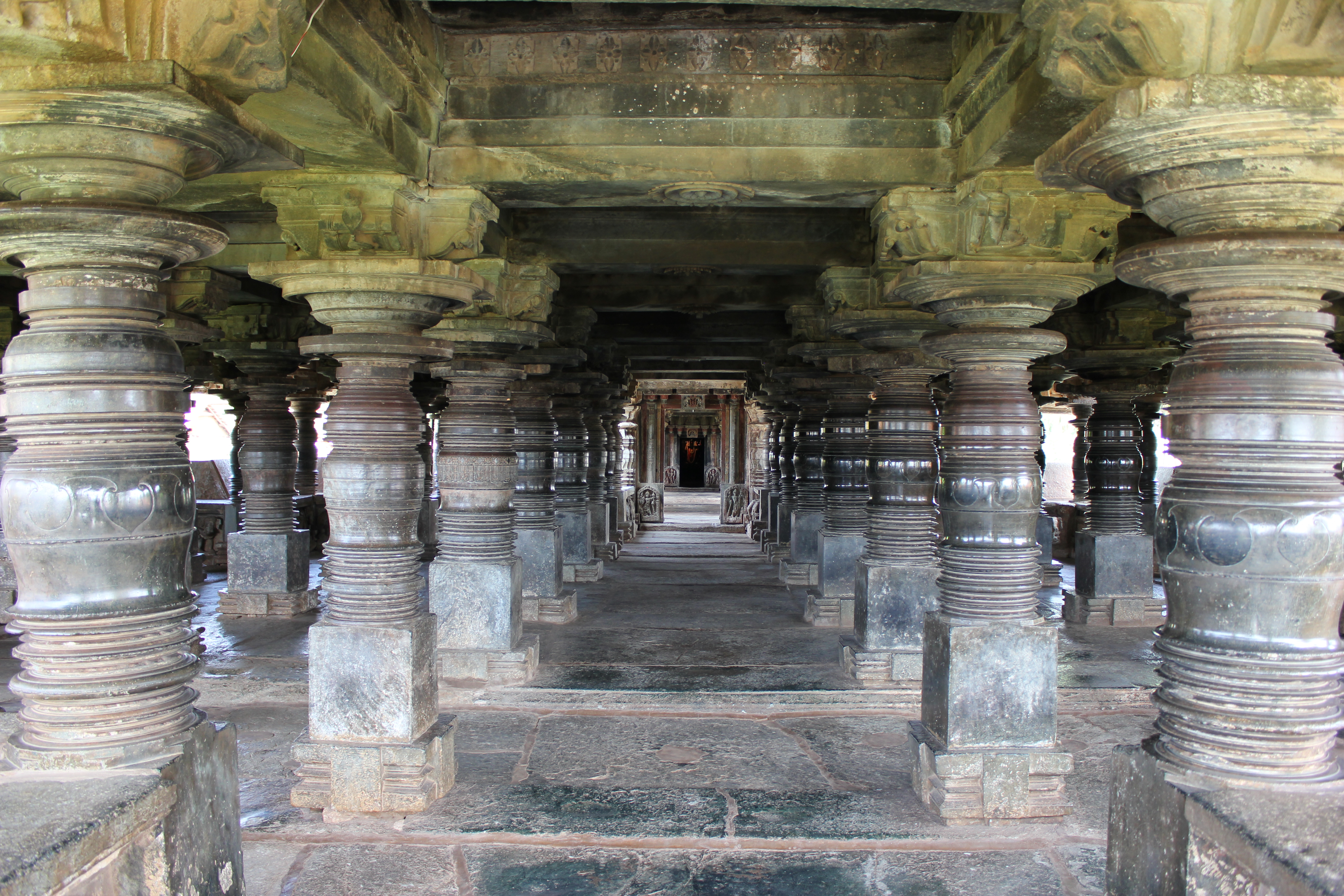
Outer mantapa (hall) at Veera Narayana temple in Belavadi

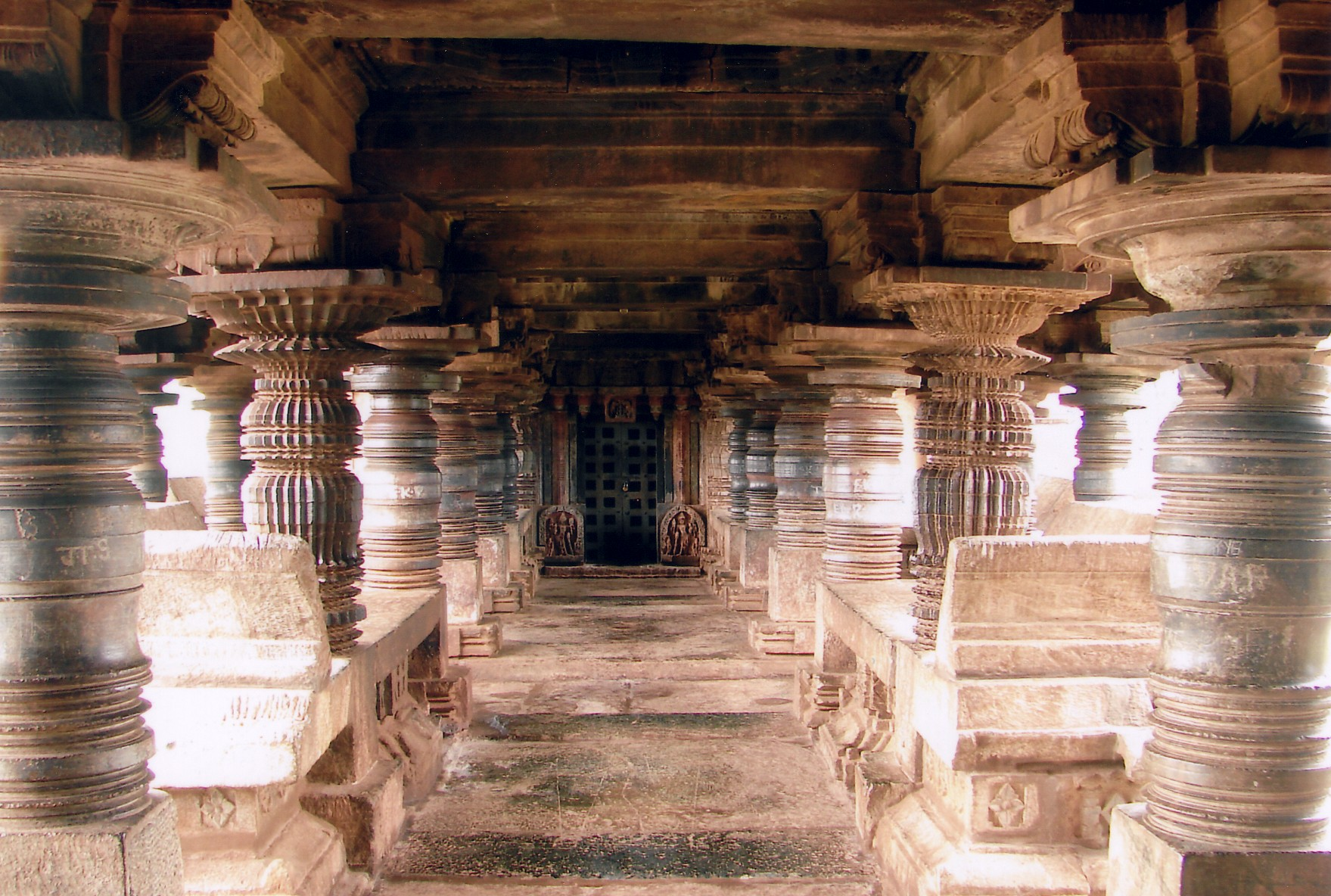
Inner mantapa (hall) in Veeranarayana temple at Belavadi

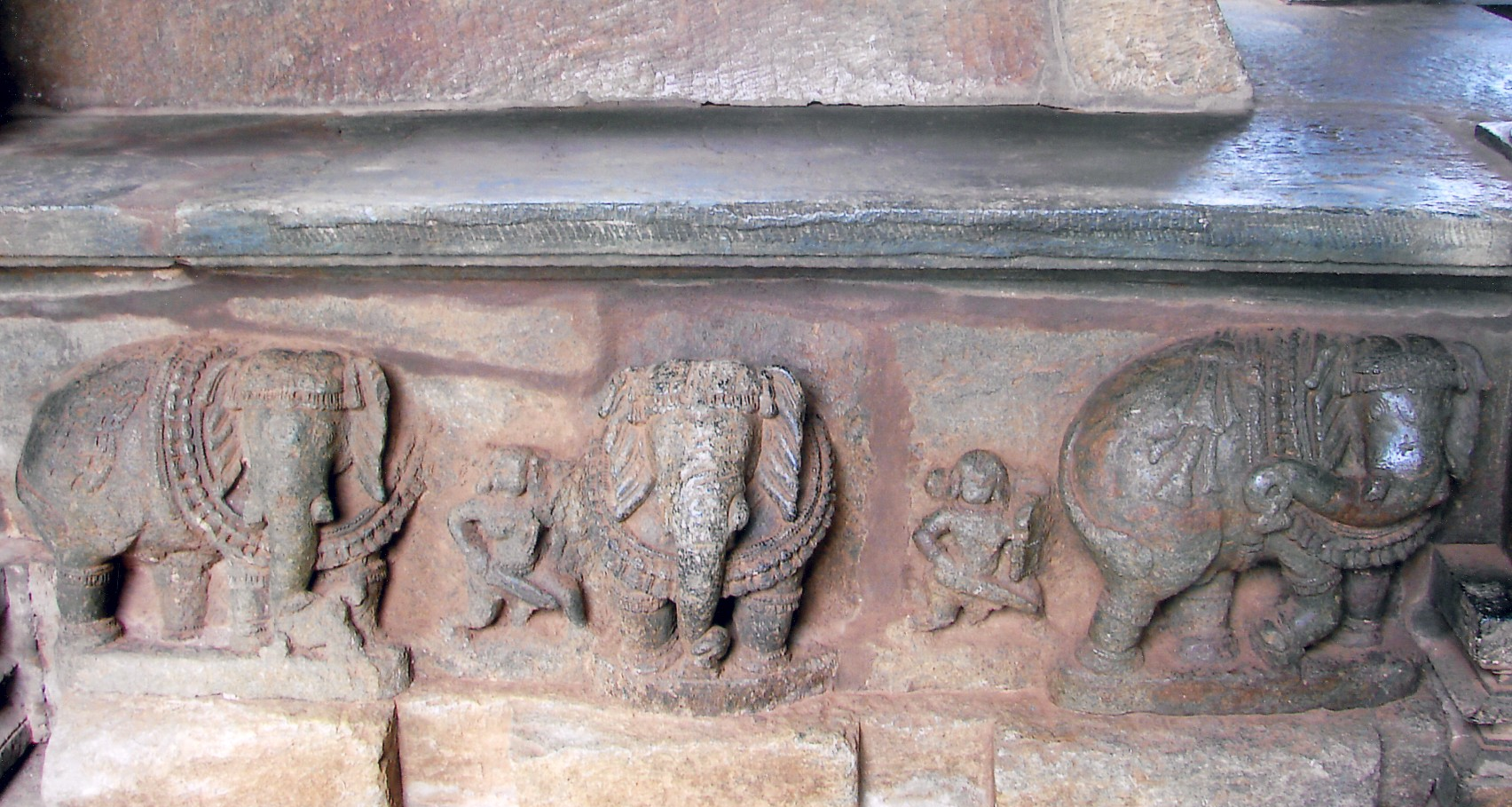
Parapet wall relief sculpture in the Veera Narayana temple at Belavadi

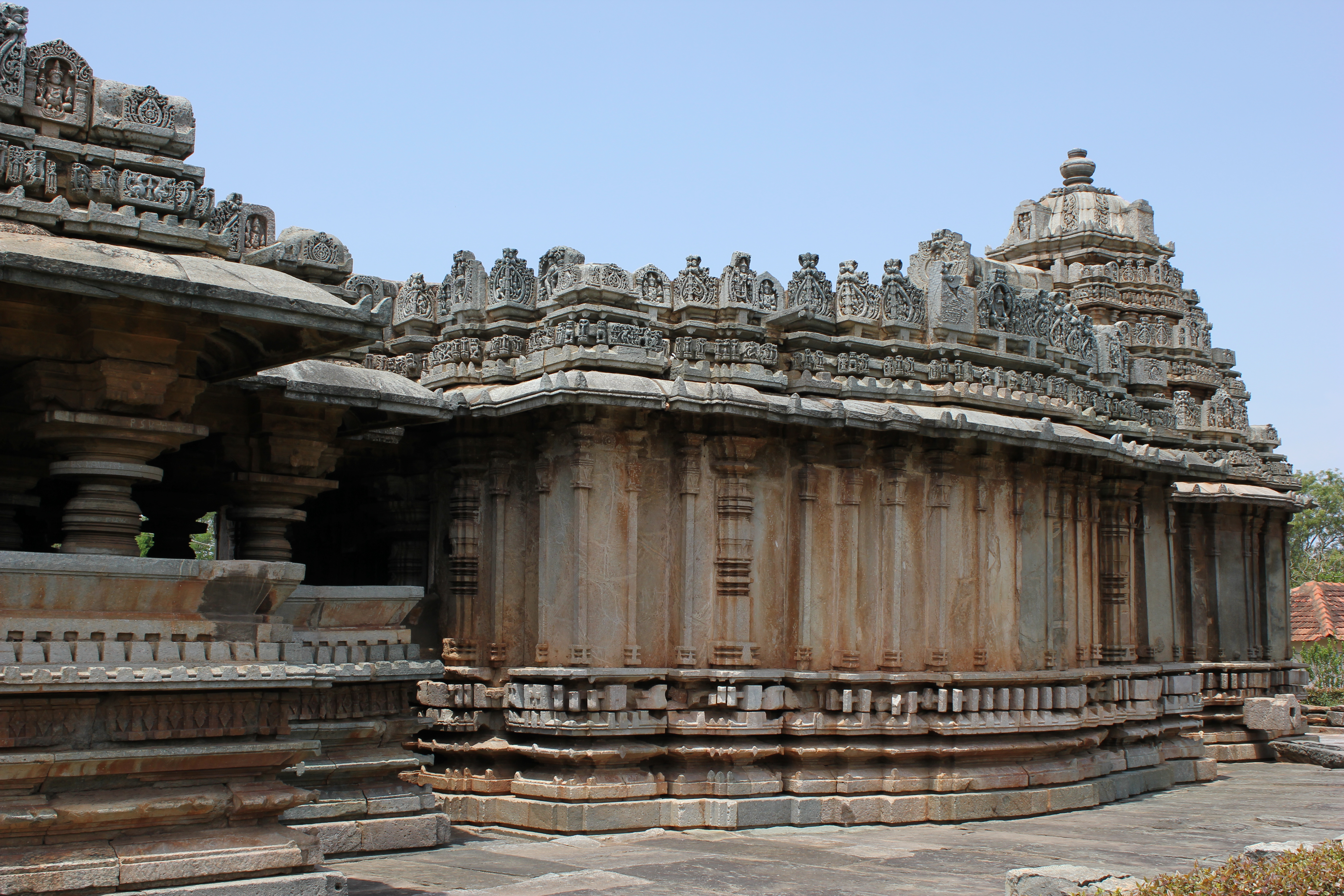
Profile of rear shrine in the Veeranarayana temple at Belavadi

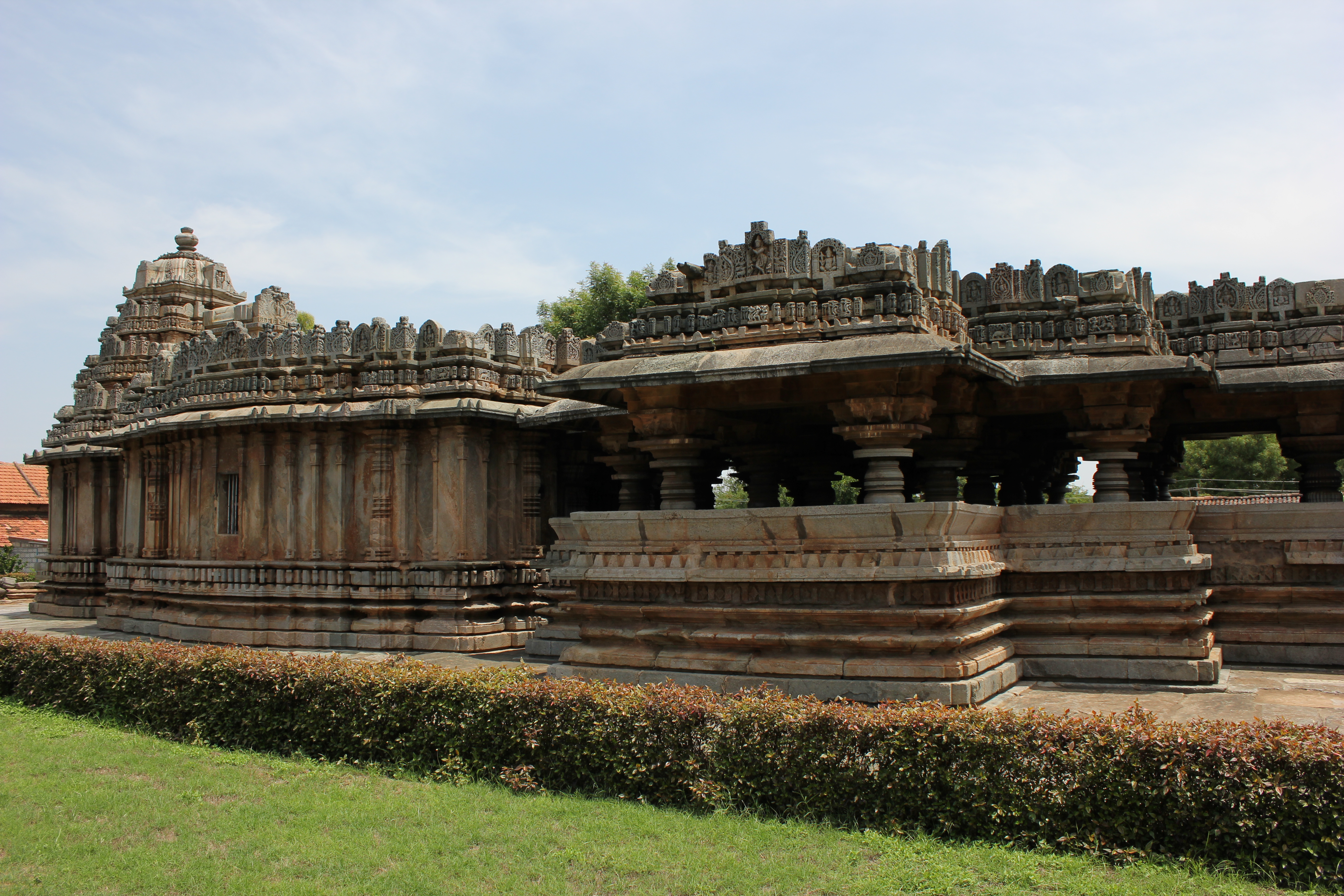
Profile of rear shrine in the Veeranarayana temple at Belavadi

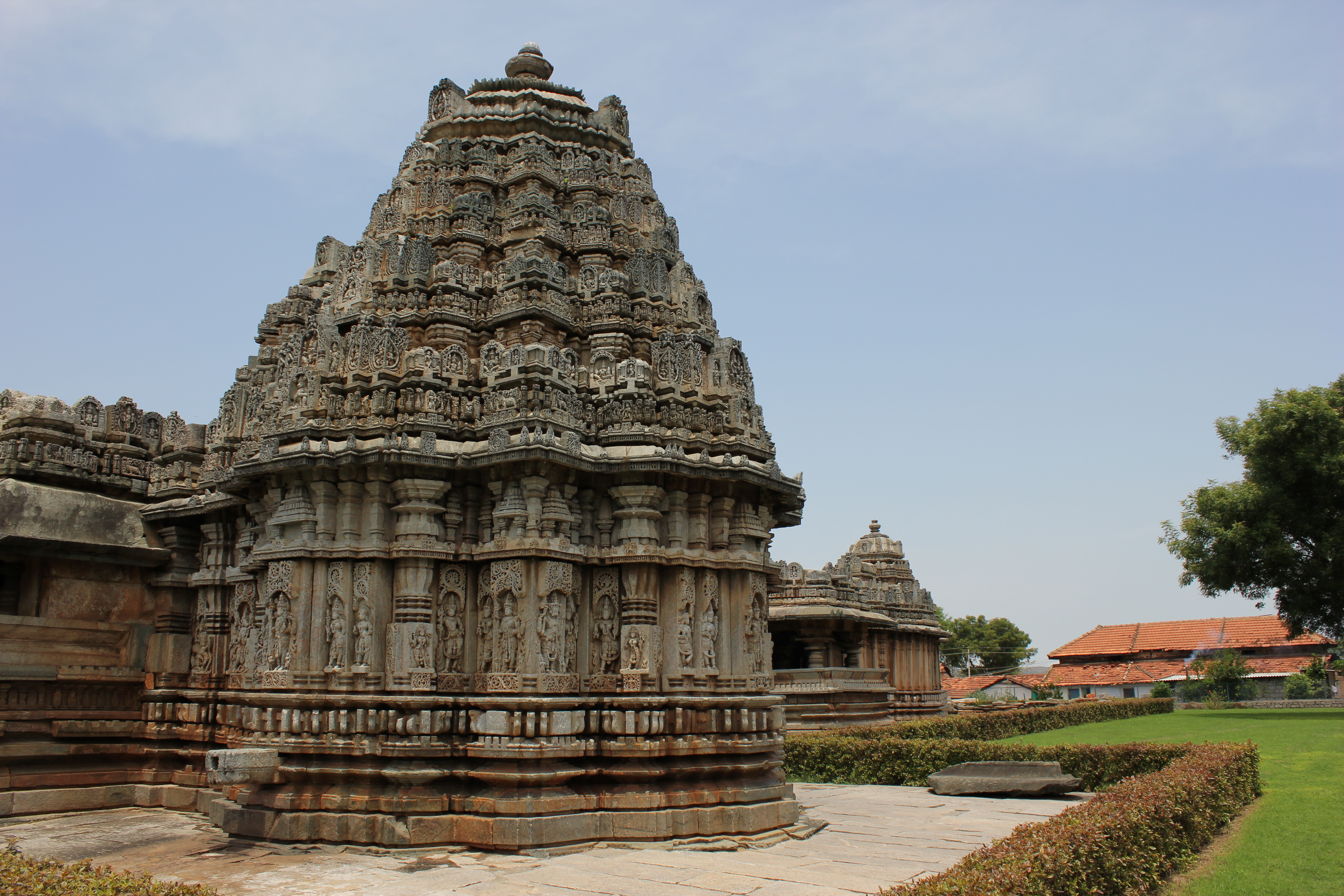
View of front right shrine with rear shrine in the background in the Veeranarayana temple at Belavadi

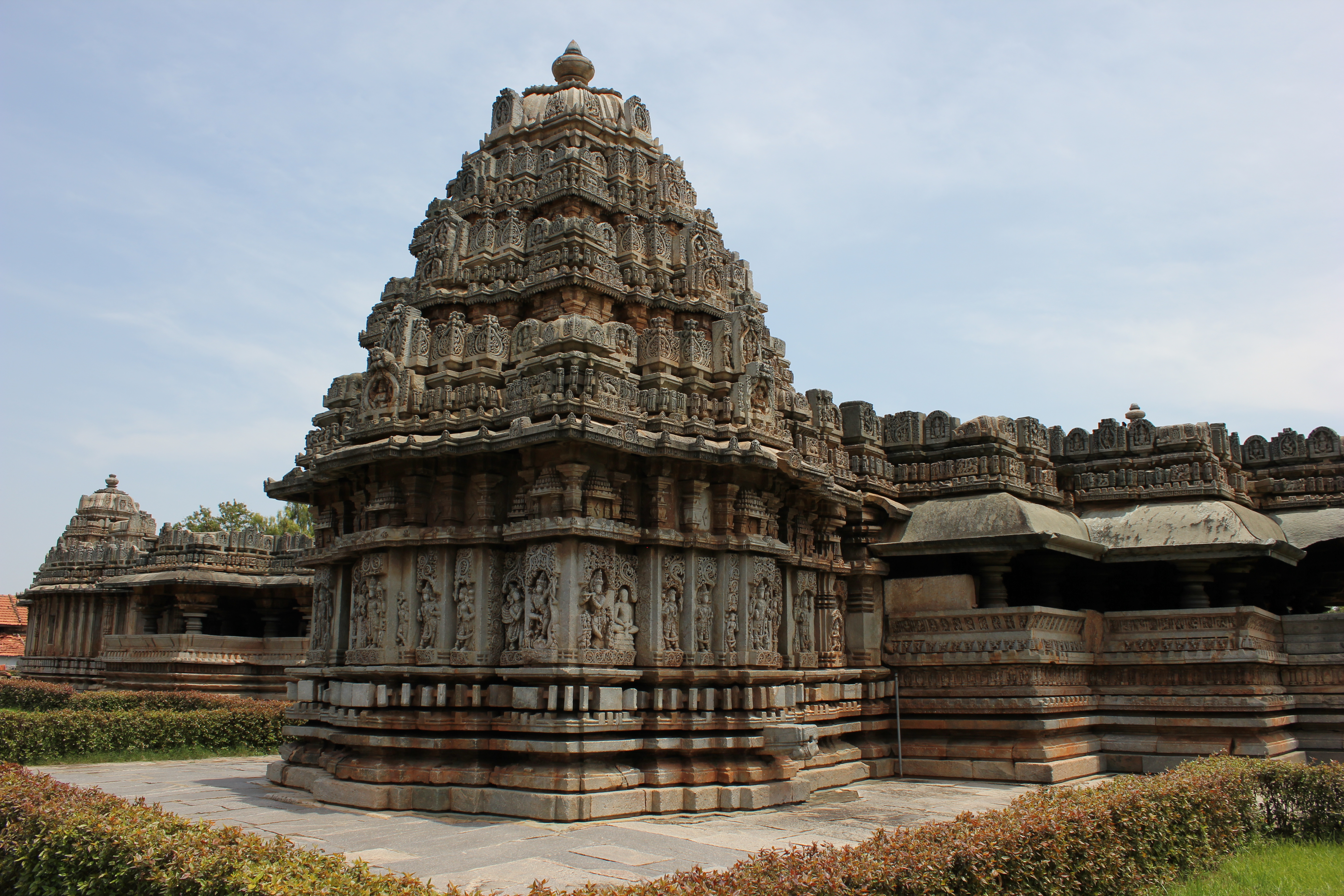
View of the front left shrine with rear shrine in the background in the Veeranarayana temple at Belavadi

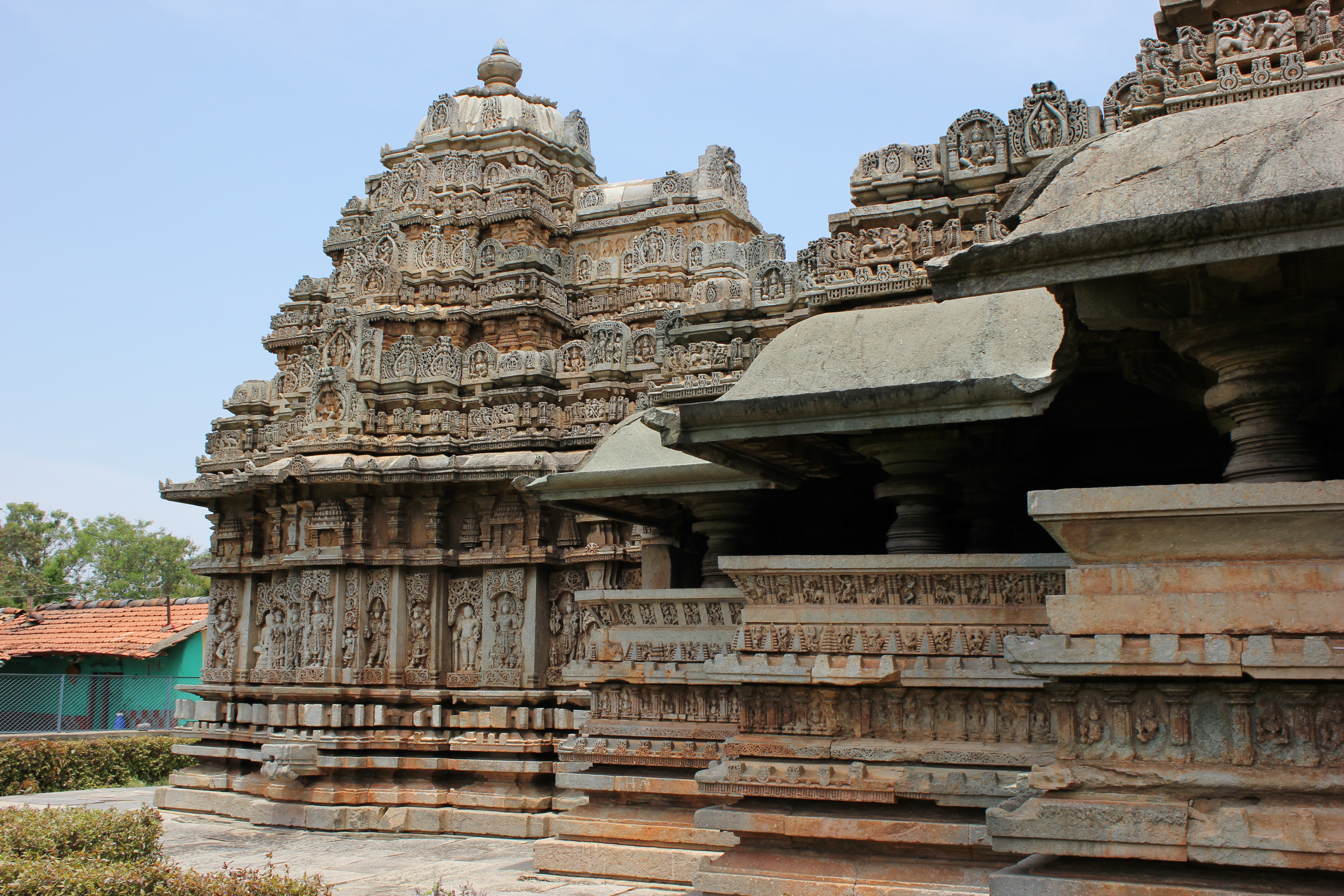
Profile of the outer mantapa and a shrine in the Veeranarayana temple at Belavadi

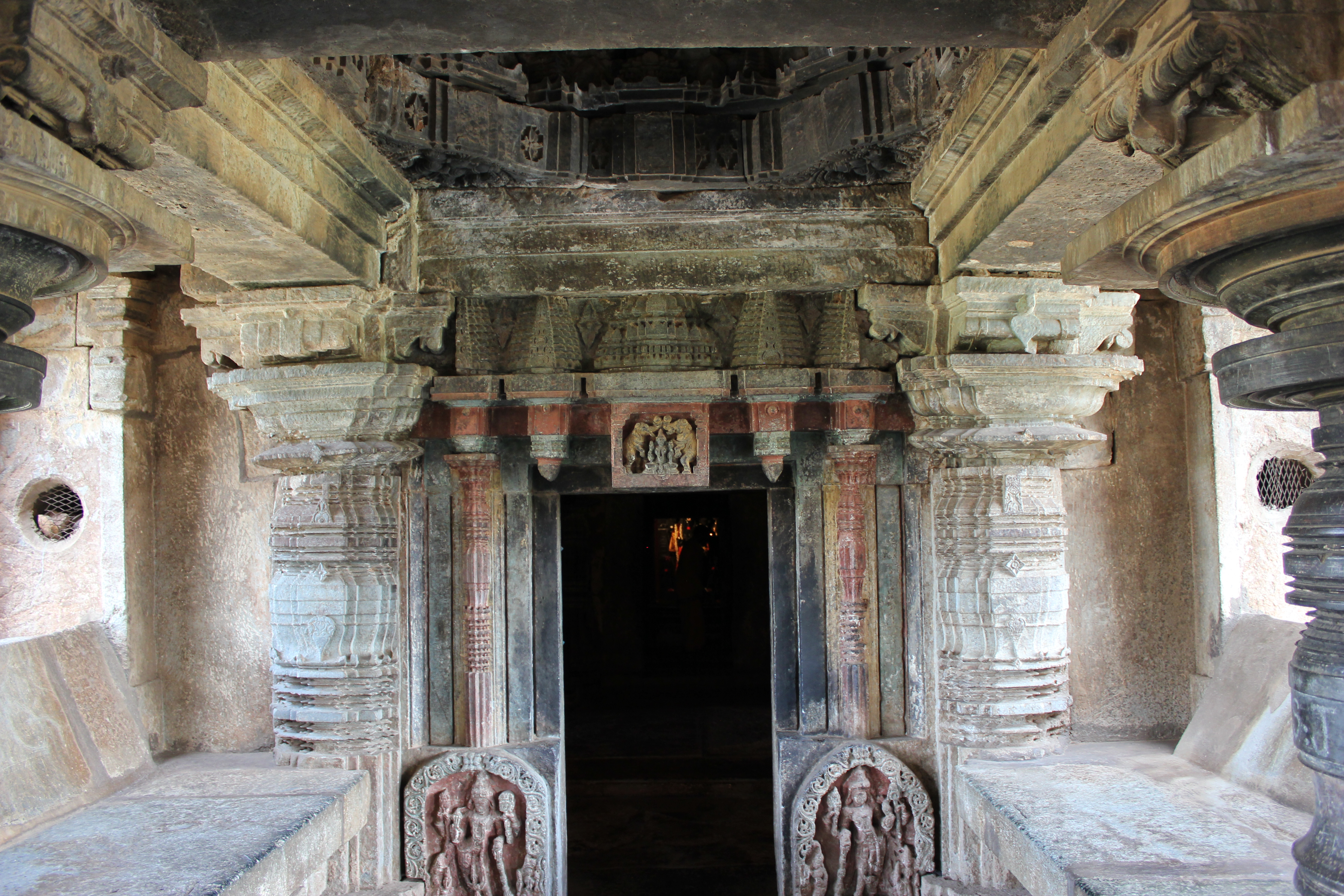
Lintel decoration at entrance into inner closed mantapa in the Veeranarayana temple at Belavadi

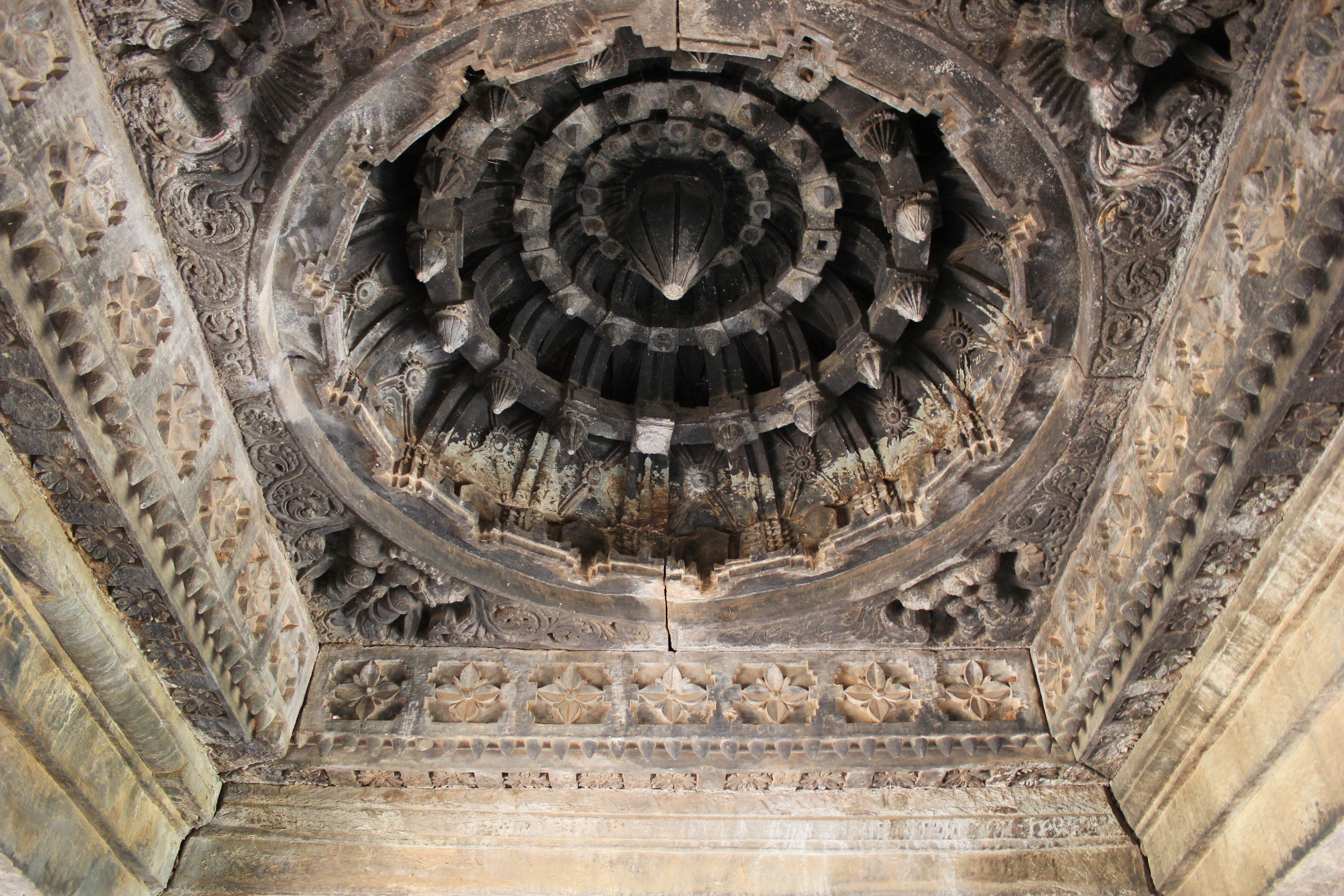
Domical bay ceiling art in outer mantapa of the Veeranarayana temple at Belavadi

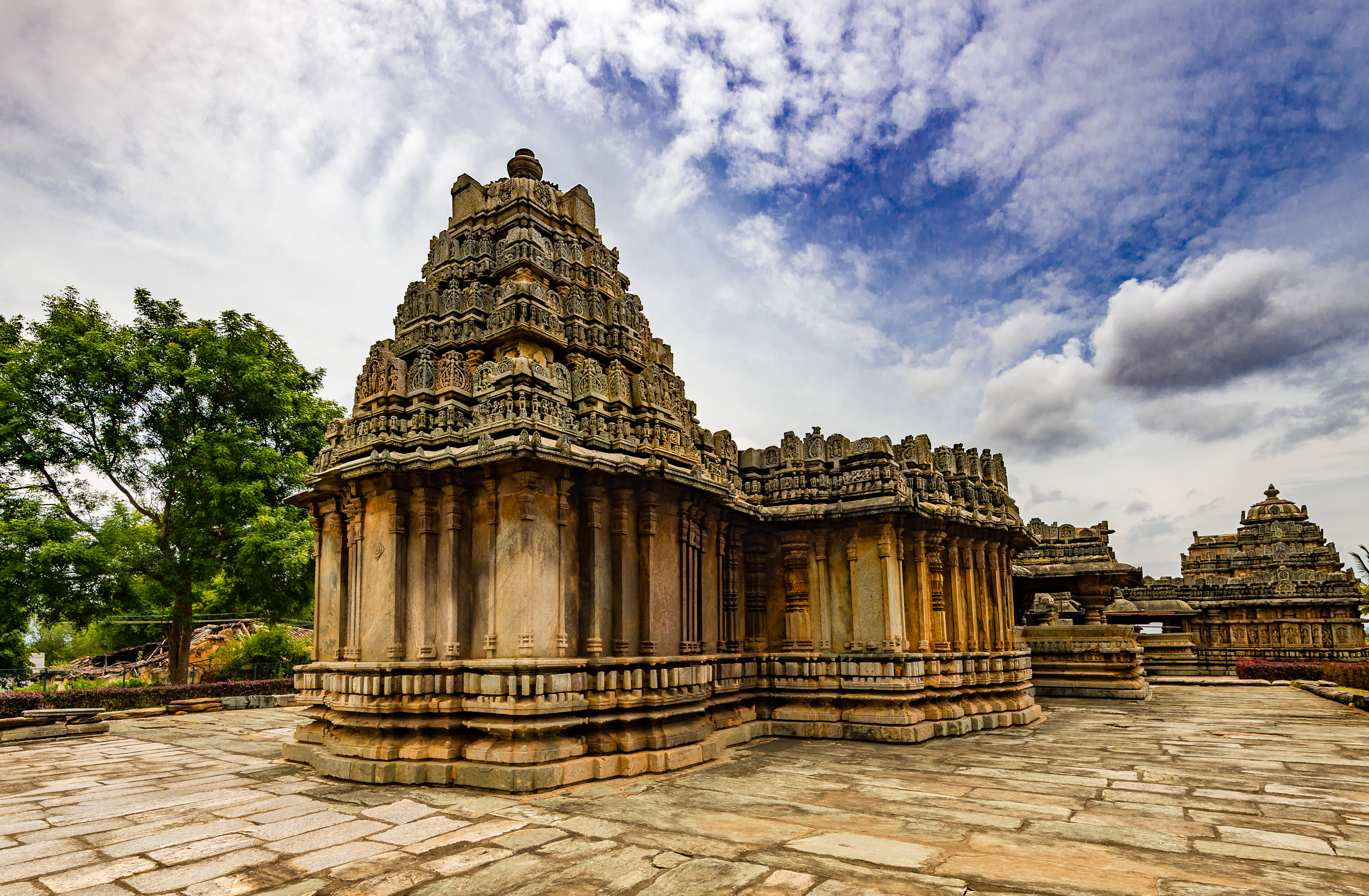
South Western View of Sri Veera Narayana Temple, Belavadi
