= Hoysala architecture =

Medieval Hindu temple style

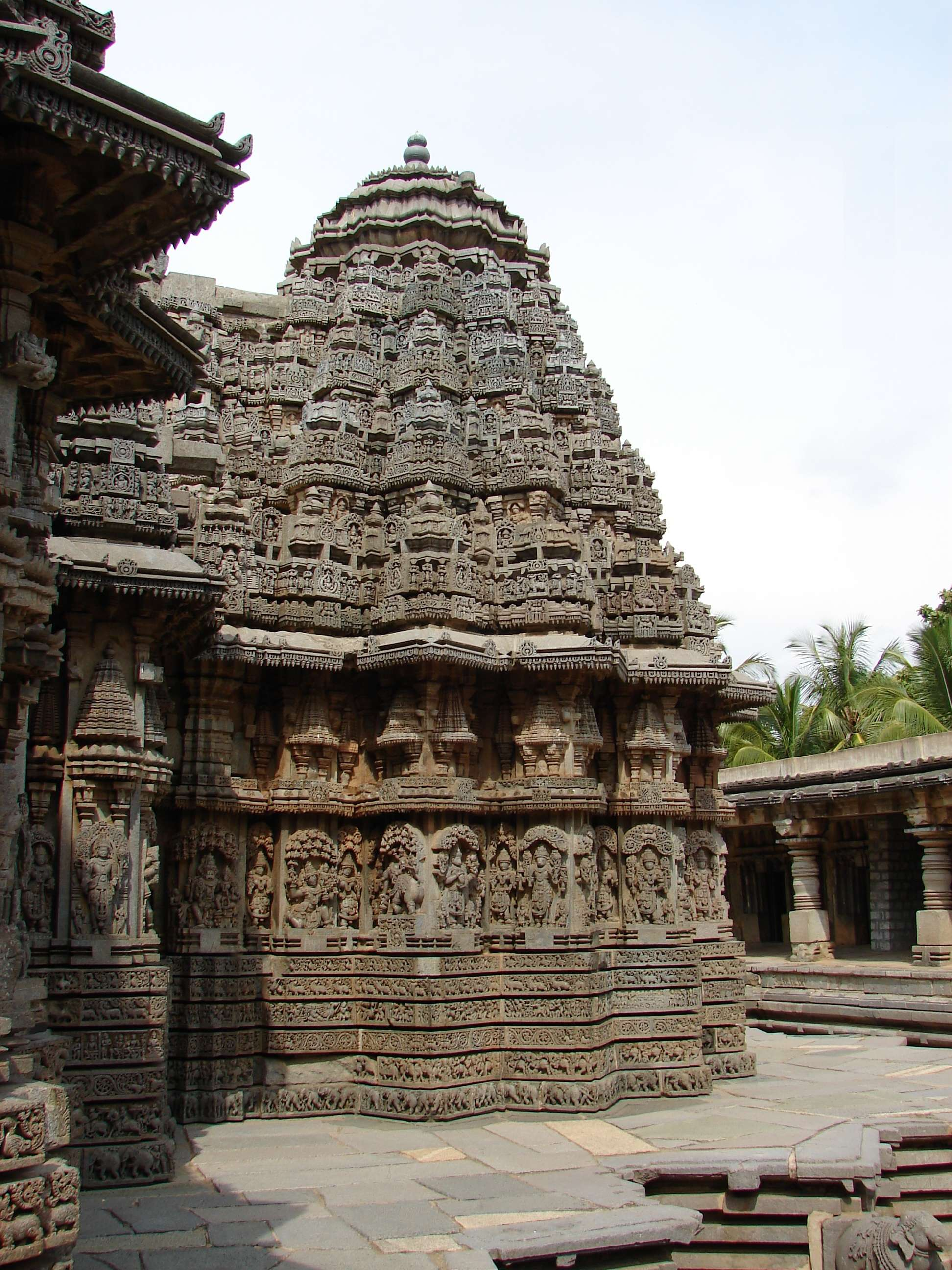
Profile of a Hoysala temple at Somanathapura

Hoysala architecture is the building style in Hindu temple architecture developed under the rule of the Hoysala Empire between the 11th and 14th centuries, in the region known today as Karnataka, a state of India. Hoysala influence was at its peak in the 13th century, when it dominated the Southern Deccan Plateau region. Large and small temples built during this era remain as examples of the Hoysala architectural style, including the Chennakesava Temple at Belur, the Hoysaleswara Temple at Halebidu, and the Kesava Temple at Somanathapura. These three temples were accorded UNESCO world heritage site status in 2023. Other examples of Hoysala craftsmanship are the temples at Belavadi, Amruthapura, Hosaholalu, Mosale, Arasikere, Basaralu, Kikkeri and Nuggehalli. Study of the Hoysala architectural style has revealed a negligible North Indian influence while the impact of Southern Indian style is more distinct.

Temples built prior to Hoysala independence in the mid-12th century reflect significant Western Chalukya influences, while later temples retain some features salient to Western Chalukya architecture but have additional inventive decoration and ornamentation, features unique to Hoysala artisans. Some three hundred temples are known to survive in present-day Karnataka state and many more are mentioned in inscriptions, though only about seventy have been documented. The greatest concentration of these are in the Malnad (hill) districts, the native home of the Hoysala kings.

Hoysala architecture is classified by the influential scholar Adam Hardy as part of the Karnata Dravida tradition, a trend within Dravidian architecture in the Deccan that is distinct from the Tamil style of further south. Other terms for the tradition are Vesara, and Chalukya architecture, divided into early Badami Chalukya architecture and the Western Chalukya architecture which immediately preceded the Hoysalas. The whole tradition covers a period of about seven centuries began in the 7th century under the patronage of the Chalukya dynasty of Badami, developed further under the Rashtrakutas of Manyakheta during the 9th and 10th centuries and the Western Chalukyas (or Later Chalukyas) of Basavakalyan in the 11th and 12th centuries. Its final development stage and transformation into an independent style was during the rule of the Hoysalas in the 12th and 13th centuries. Medieval inscriptions displayed prominently at temple locations give information about donations made toward the maintenance of the temple, details of consecration and on occasion, even architectural details.

== Temple deities ==
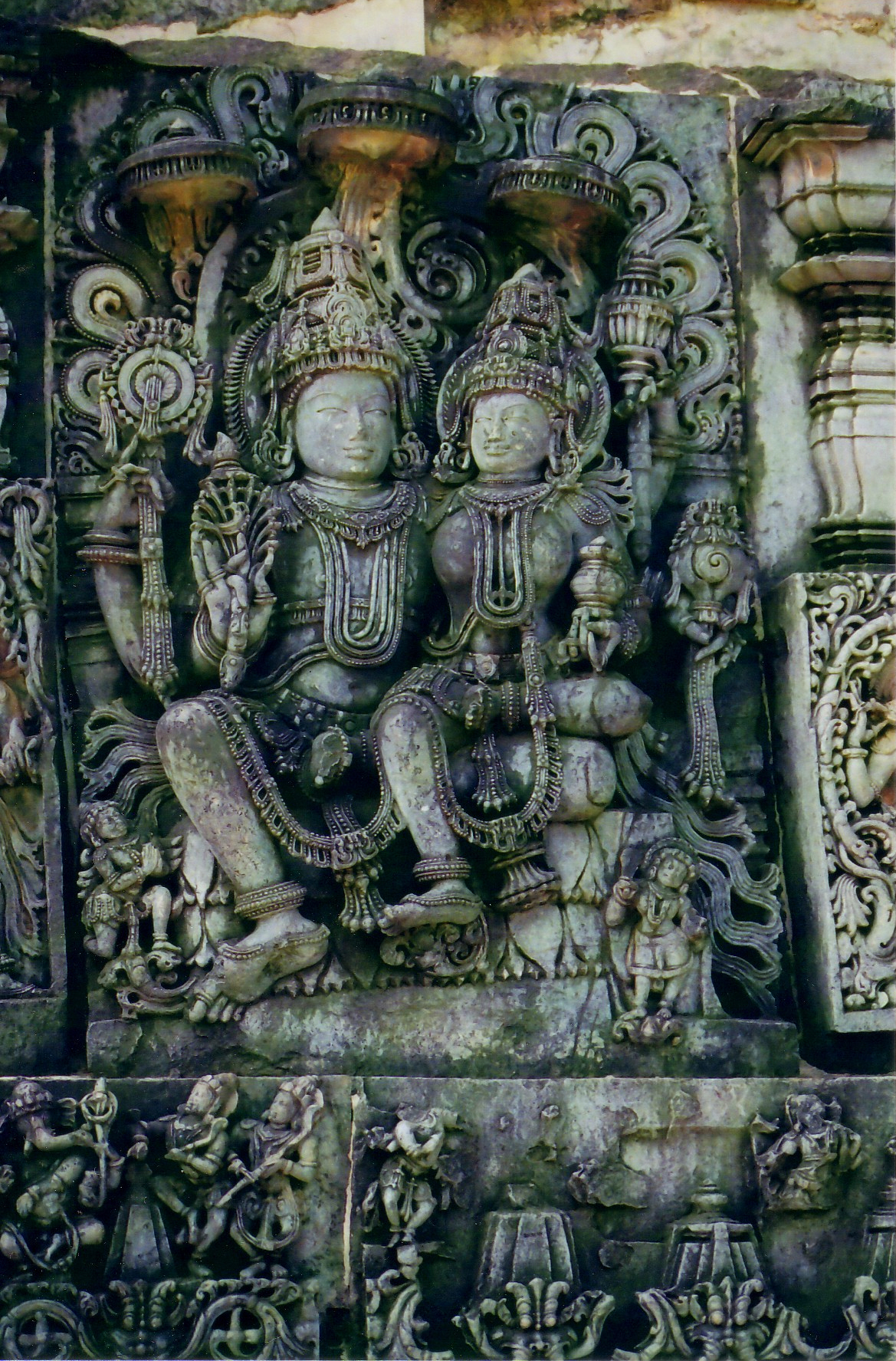
Vishnu with Lakshmi (Lakshminarayana) at Halebidu

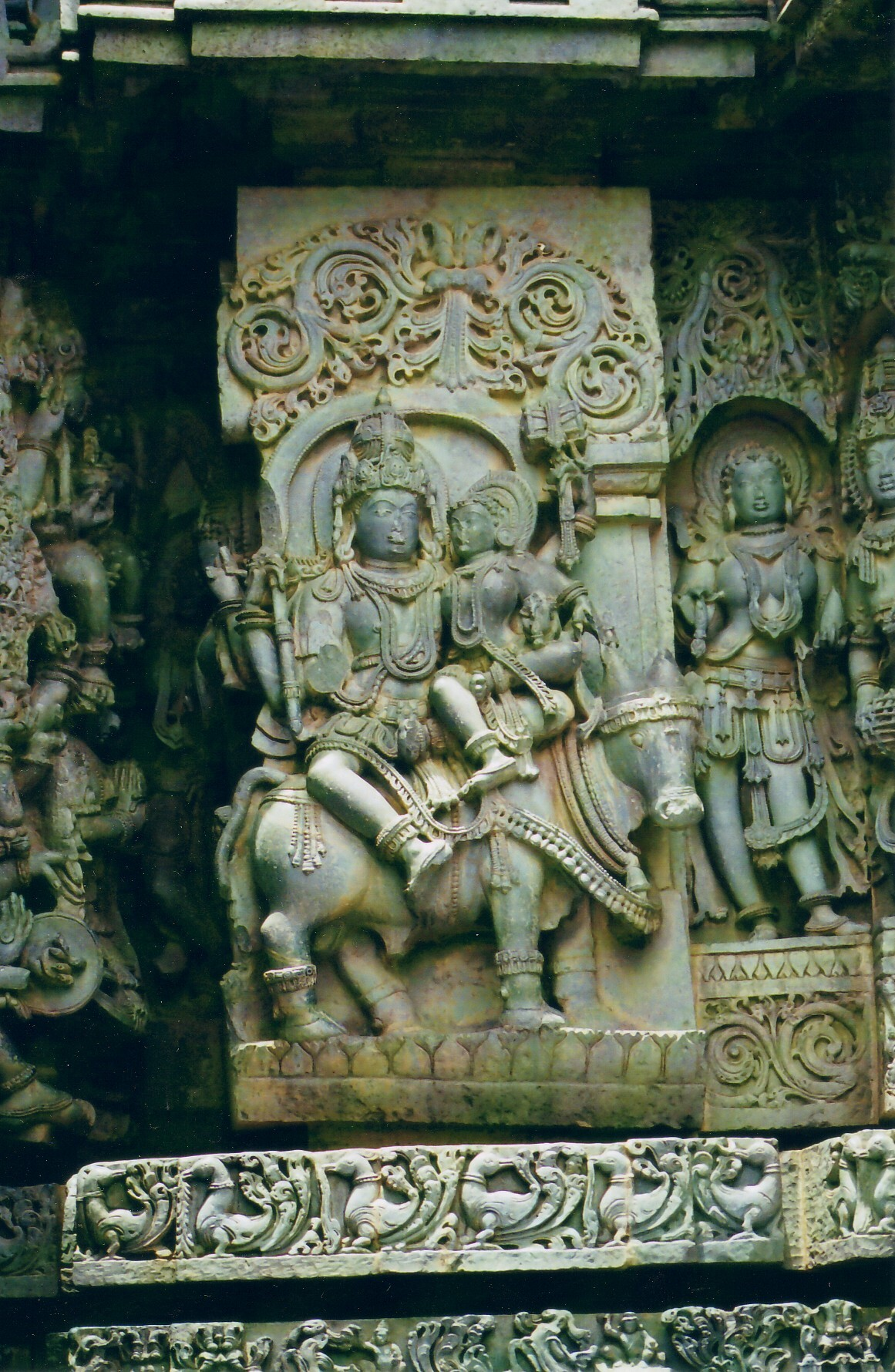
Shiva, Parvati, Nandi at Halebidu

Hinduism is a combination of secular and sacred beliefs, rituals, daily practices and traditions that has evolved over the course of over two thousand years and embodies complex symbolism combining the natural world with philosophy.

Hindu temples began as simple shrines housing a deity and by the time of the Hoysalas had evolved into well-articulated edifices in which worshippers sought transcendence of the daily world. Hoysala temples were not limited to any specifically organised tradition of Hinduism and encouraged pilgrims of different Hindu devotional movements. The Hoysalas usually dedicated their temples to Shiva or Vishnu (two of the popular Hindu gods), but they occasionally built some temples dedicated to the Jain faith as well. Worshippers of Shiva are called Shaivas and worshippers of Vishnu are called Vaishnavas. While King Vishnuvardhana and his descendants were Vaishnava by faith, records show that the Hoysalas maintained religious harmony by building as many temples dedicated to Shiva as they did to Vishnu.

Most of these temples have secular features with broad themes depicted in their sculptures. This can be seen in the famous Chennakesava Temple at Belur dedicated to Vishnu and in the Hoysaleswara temple at Halebidu dedicated to Shiva. The Kesava temple at Somanathapura is different in that its ornamentation is strictly Vaishnava. Generally Vaishnava temples are dedicated to Keshava (or to Chennakeshava, meaning "Beautiful Vishnu") while a small number are dedicated to Lakshminarayana and Lakshminarasimha (Narayana and Narasimha both being Avatars, or physical manifestations, of Vishnu) with Lakshmi, consort of Vishnu, seated at his feet. Temples dedicated to Vishnu are always named after the deity.

The Shaiva temples have a Shiva linga, symbol of fertility and the universal symbol of Shiva, in the shrine. The names of Shiva temples can end with the suffix eshwara meaning "Lord of". The name "Hoysaleswara", for instance, means "Lord of Hoysala". The temple can also be named after the devotee who commissioned the construction of the temple, an example being the Bucesvara temple at Koravangala, named after the devotee Buci. The most striking sculptural decorations are the horizontal rows of mouldings with detailed relief, and intricately carved images of gods, goddesses and their attendants on the outer temple wall panels.

The Doddagaddavalli Lakshmi Devi ("Goddess of Wealth") Temple is an exception as it is dedicated to neither Vishnu nor Shiva. The defeat of the Jain Western Ganga Dynasty (of present-day south Karnataka) by the Cholas in the early 11th century and the rising numbers of followers of Vaishnava Hinduism and Virashaivism in the 12th century was mirrored by a decreased interest in Jainism. However, two notable locations of Jain worship in the Hoysala territory were Shravanabelagola and Kambadahalli. The Hoysalas built Jain temples to satisfy the needs of its Jain population, a few of which have survived in Halebidu containing icons of Jain tirthankaras. They constructed stepped wells called Pushkarni or Kalyani, the ornate tank at Hulikere being an example. The tank has twelve minor shrines containing Hindu deities.

The two main deities found in Hoysala temple sculpture are Shiva and Vishnu in their various forms and avatars (incarnations). Shiva is usually shown with four arms holding a trident and a small drum among other emblems that symbolise objects worshiped independently of the divine image with which they are associated. Any male icon portrayed in this way is Shiva although a female icon may sometimes be portrayed with these attributes as Shiva's consort, Parvati. Various depictions of Shiva exist: showing him naked (fully or partially), in activities such as slaying a demon (Andhaka) or dancing on the head of a slain elephant (Gajasura) and holding its skin up behind his back. He is often accompanied by his consort Parvati or shown with Nandi the bull. He may be represented as Bhairava, another of Shiva's many manifestations.

A male figure depicted holding certain objects such as a conch (symbol of eternal, heavenly space) and a wheel (eternal time and destructive power) is Vishnu. If a female figure is depicted holding these objects, she is seen as his consort, Lakshmi. In all of the depictions Vishnu is holding four objects: a conch, a wheel, a lotus and a Kaumodaki (mace). These can be held in any of the icon's hands, making possible twenty-four different forms of Vishnu, each with a unique name. Apart from these, Vishnu is depicted in any of his ten avataras, which include Vishnu sitting on Anantha (the celestial snake and keeper of life energy also known as Shesha), Vishnu with Lakshmi seated on his lap (Lakshminarayana), with the head of a lion disembowelling a demon on his lap (Lakshminarasimha), with head of a boar walking over a demon (Varaha), in the Krishna avatar (as Venugopala or the cow herder playing the Venu (flute), dancing on the head of the snake Kaliya, lifting a hill such as Govardhana), with his feet over head of a small figure (Vamana), along with Indra riding an elephant, with Lakshmi seated on Garuda, and the eagle (stealing the parijata tree).

== Temple complex ==
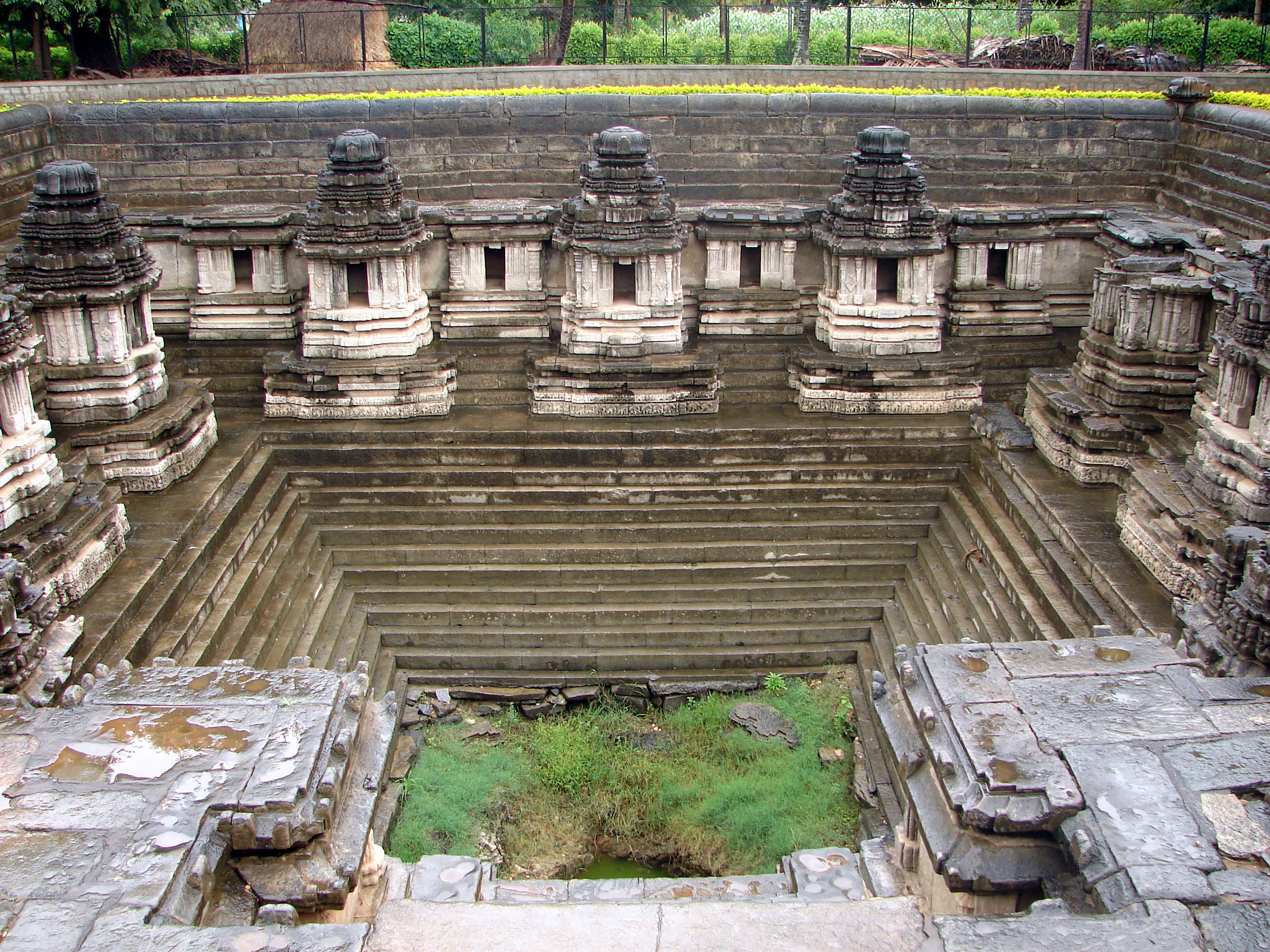
Hoysala stepped temple tank (Kalyani) at Hulikere, Karnataka

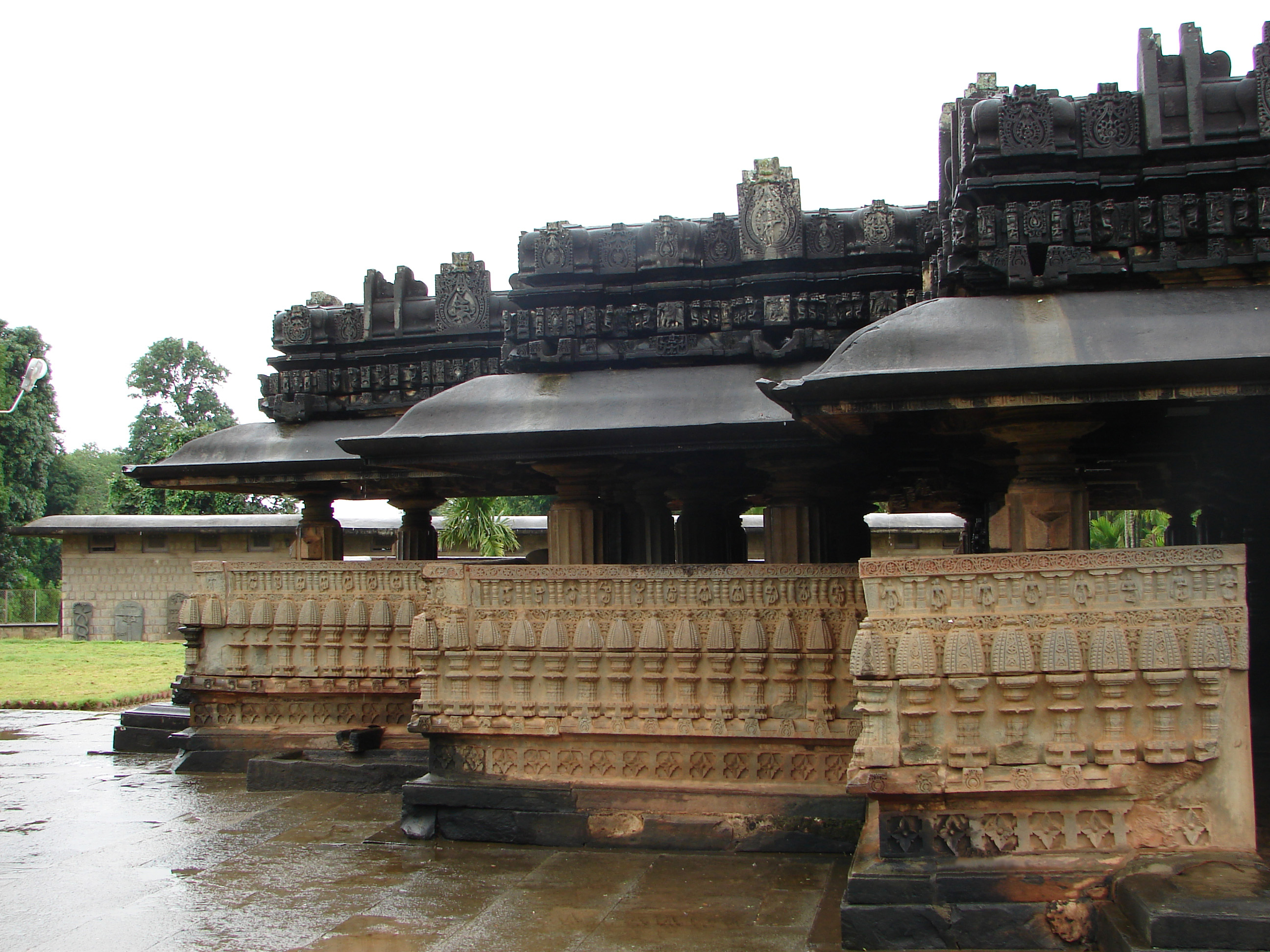
Temple profile – staggered square plan mantapa at Kedareshvara Temple, Balligavi

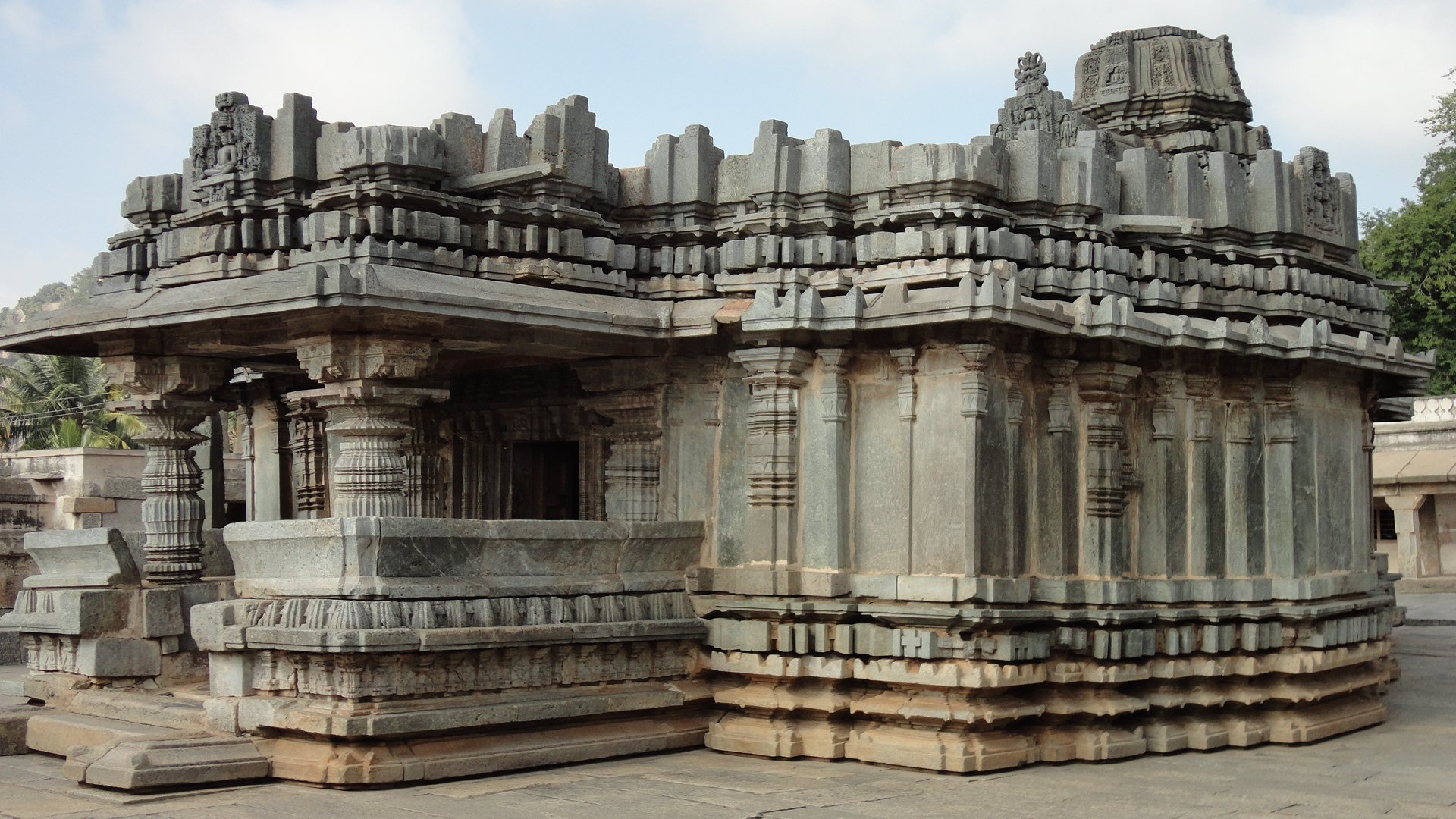
Akkana Basadi at Shravanbelgola

The focus of a temple is the centre or sanctum sanctorum (garbhagriha) where the image of the deity resides, so temple architecture is designed to move the devotee from outside to the garbhagriha through ambulatory passageways for circumambulation and halls or chambers (mantapas) that become increasingly sacred as the deity is approached. Hoysala temples have distinct parts that are merged to form a unified organic whole, in contrast to the temples of Tamil country where different parts of a temple stand independently. Although superficially unique, Hoysala temples resemble each other structurally. They are characterised by a complex profusion of sculpture decorating all the temple parts chiselled of soft soapstone (chloritic schist), a good material for intricate carving, executed mostly by local craftsmen, and exhibit architectural features that distinguish them from other temple architectures of South India.

Most Hoysala temples have a plain covered entrance porch supported by lathe turned (circular or bell-shaped) pillars which were sometimes further carved with deep fluting and moulded with decorative motifs. The temples may be built upon a platform raised by about a metre called a "jagati". The jagati, apart from giving a raised look to the temple, serves as a pradakshinapatha or "circumambulation path" for circumambulation around the temple, as the garbagriha (inner sanctum) provides no such feature. Such temples will have an additional set of steps leading to an open mantapa (open hall) with parapet walls. A good example of this style is the Kesava Temple at Somanathapura. The jagati which is in unity with the rest of the temple follows a star-shaped design and the walls of the temple follow a zig-zag pattern, a Hoysala innovation.

Devotees can first complete a ritual circumambulation on the jagati starting from the main entrance by walking in a clockwise direction (towards the left) before entering the mantapa, following the sculptural clockwise-sequenced reliefs on the outer temple walls depicting a sequence of epic scenes from the Hindu epics. Temples that are not built on a jagati can have steps flanked by elephant balustrades (parapets) that lead to the mantapa from ground level. An example of a temple that does not exhibit the raised platform is the Bucesvara temple in Korvangla, Hassan District. In temples with two shrines (dvikuta), the vimanas (the shrines or cellae) may be placed either next to each other or on opposite sides. The Lakshmidevi temple at Doddagaddavalli is unique to Hoysala architecture as it has four shrines around a common centre and a fifth shrine within the same complex for the deity Bhairava (a form of Shiva). In addition, four minor shrines exist at each corner of the courtyard (prakaram).

== Architectural elements ==
=== Mantapa ===
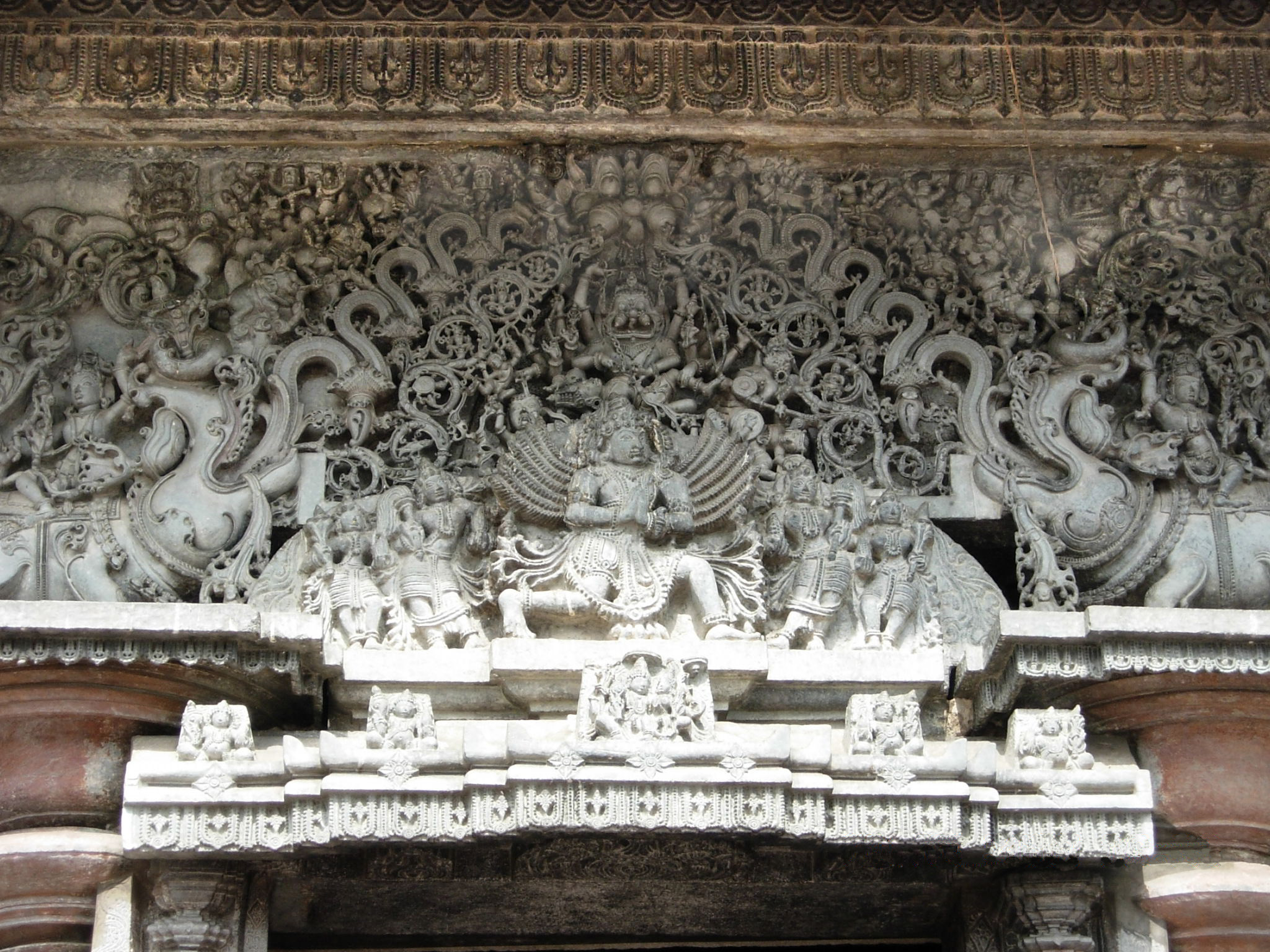
Ornate lintel over mantapa entrance in Chennakeshava temple, Belur

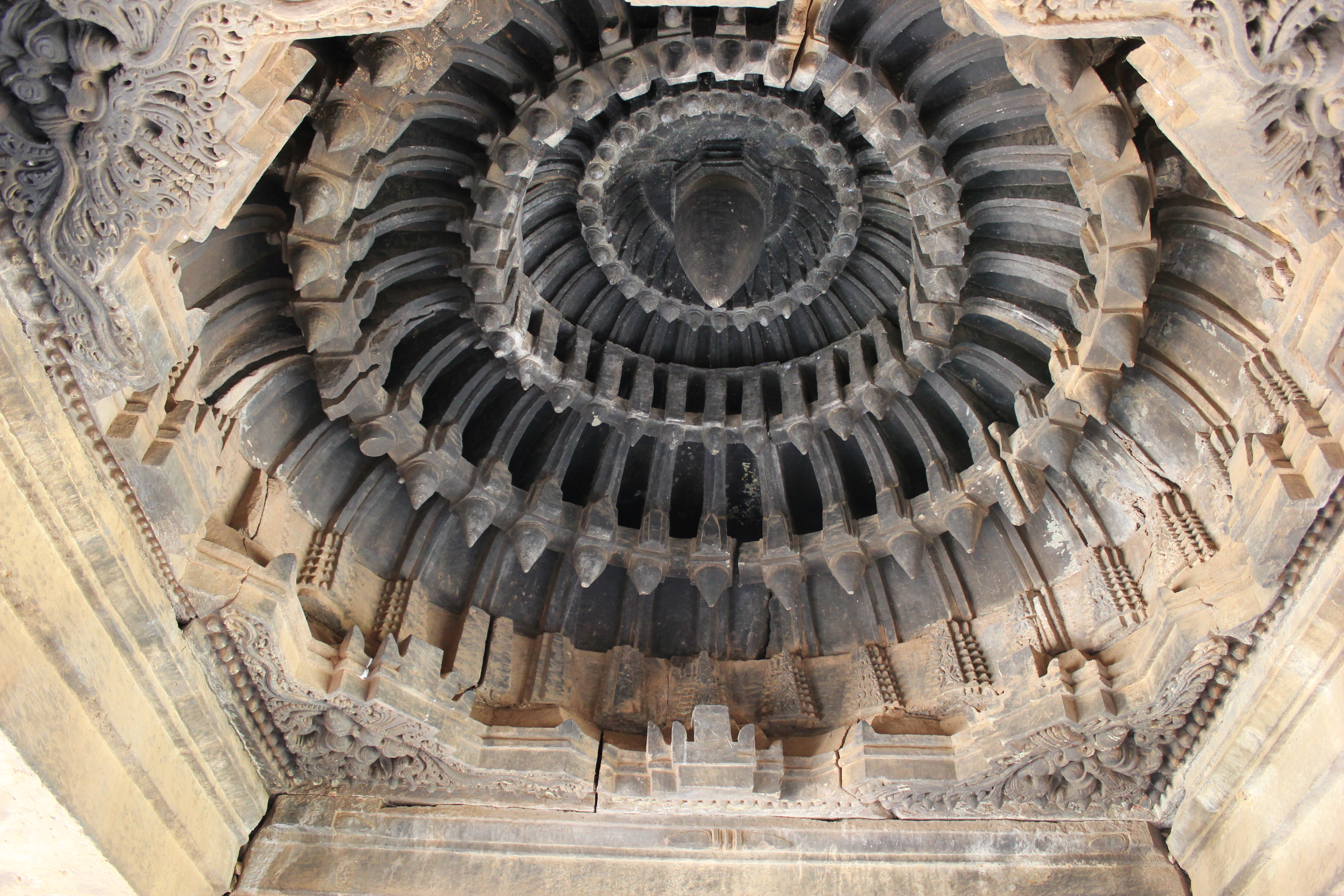
Ornate bay ceiling in mantapa in the Veera Narayana Temple, Belavadi, a common feature in Hoysala temples

The mantapa is the hall where groups of people gather during prayers. The entrance to the mantapa normally has a highly ornate overhead lintel called a makaratorana (makara is an imaginary beast and torana is an overhead decoration). The open mantapa which serves the purpose of an outer hall (outer mantapa) is a regular feature in larger Hoysala temples leading to an inner small closed mantapa and the shrines. The open mantapas which are often spacious have seating areas (asana) made of stone with the mantapa's parapet wall acting as a back rest. The seats may follow the same staggered square shape of the parapet wall. The ceiling here is supported by numerous pillars that create many bays. The shape of the open mantapa is best described as staggered-square and is the style used in most Hoysala temples. Even the smallest open mantapa has 13 bays. The walls have parapets that have half pillars supporting the outer ends of the roof which allow plenty of light making all the sculptural details visible. The mantapa ceiling is generally ornate with sculptures, both mythological and floral. The ceiling consists of deep and domical surfaces and contains sculptural depictions of banana bud motifs and other such decorations.

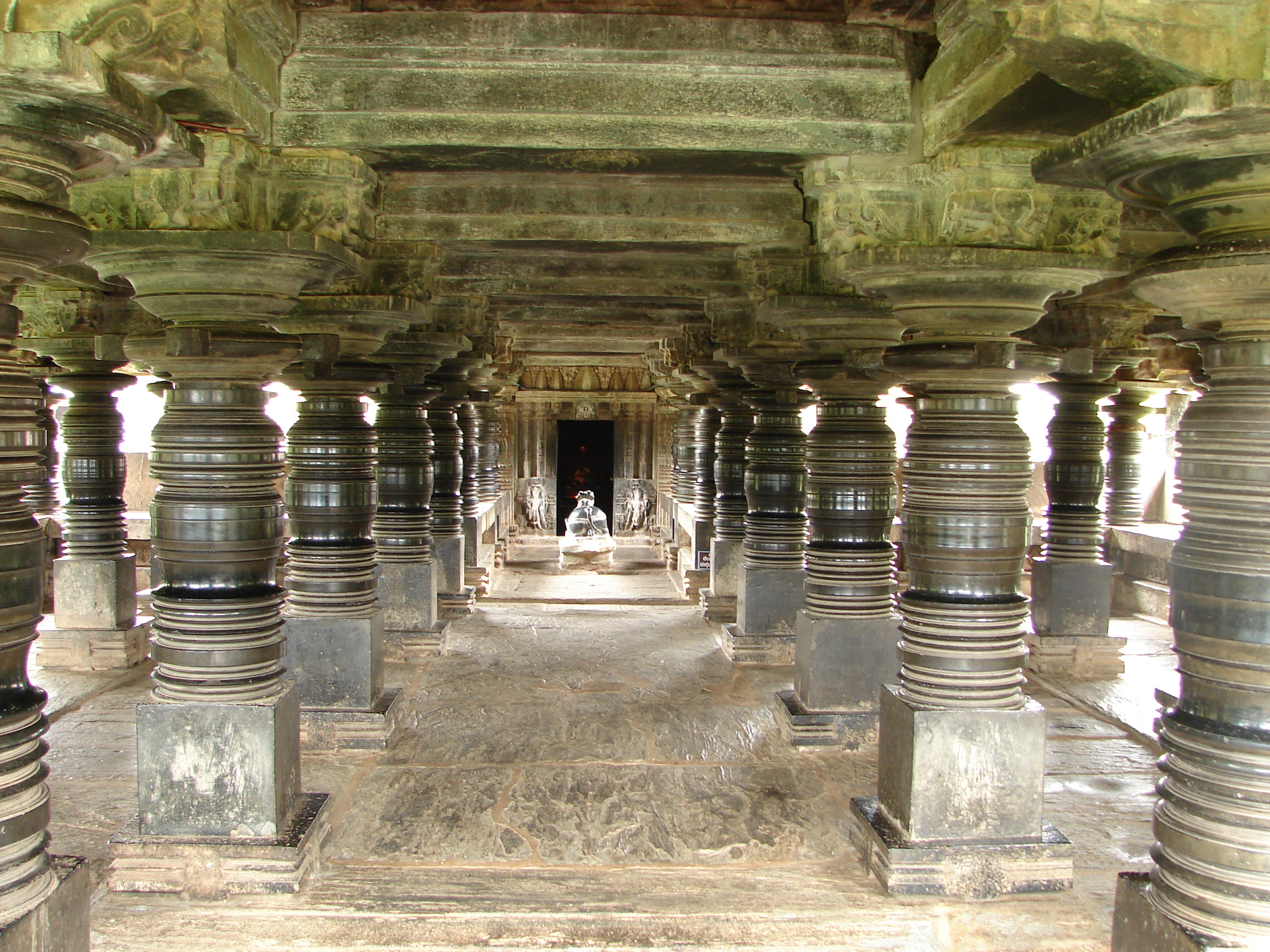
Open Mantapa with shining, lathe-turned pillars at Amrutesvara Temple, Amruthapura

If the temple is small it will consist of only a closed mantapa (enclosed with walls extending all the way to the ceiling) and the shrine. The closed mantapa, well decorated inside and out, is larger than the vestibule connecting the shrine and the mantapa and has four lathe-turned pillars to support the ceiling, which may be deeply domed. The four pillars divide the hall into nine bays. The nine bays result in nine decorated ceilings. Pierced stone screens (Jali or Latticework) that serve as windows in the navaranga (hall) and Sabhamantapa (congregation hall) is a characteristic Hoysala stylistic element.

A porch adorns the entrance to a closed mantapa, consisting of an awning supported by two half-pillars (engaged columns) and two parapets, all richly decorated. The closed mantapa is connected to the shrines by a vestibule, a square area that also connects the shrines. Its outer walls are decorated, but as the size the vestibule is not large, this may not be a conspicuous part of the temple. The vestibule also has a short tower called the sukanasi or "nose" upon which is mounted the Hoysala emblem. In Belur and Halebidu, these sculptures are quite large and are placed at all doorways.

The outer and inner mantapa (open and closed) have circular lathe-turned pillars having four brackets at the top. Over each bracket stands sculptured figures called salabhanjika or madanika. The pillars may also exhibit ornamental carvings on the surface and no two pillars are alike. This is how Hoysala art differs from the work of their early overlords, the Western Chalukyas, who added sculptural details to the circular pillar base and left the top plain. The lathe-turned pillars are 16, 32, or 64-pointed; some are bell-shaped and have properties that reflect light. The Parsvanatha Basadi at Halebidu is a good example. According to Brown, the pillars with four monolithic brackets above them carry images of salabhanjikas and madanikas (sculpture of a woman, displaying stylised feminine features). This is a common feature of Chalukya-Hoysala temples. According to Sastri, the shape of the pillar and its capital, the base of which is square and whose shaft is a monolith that is lathe turned to render different shapes, is a "remarkable feature" of Hoysala art.

=== Vimana ===
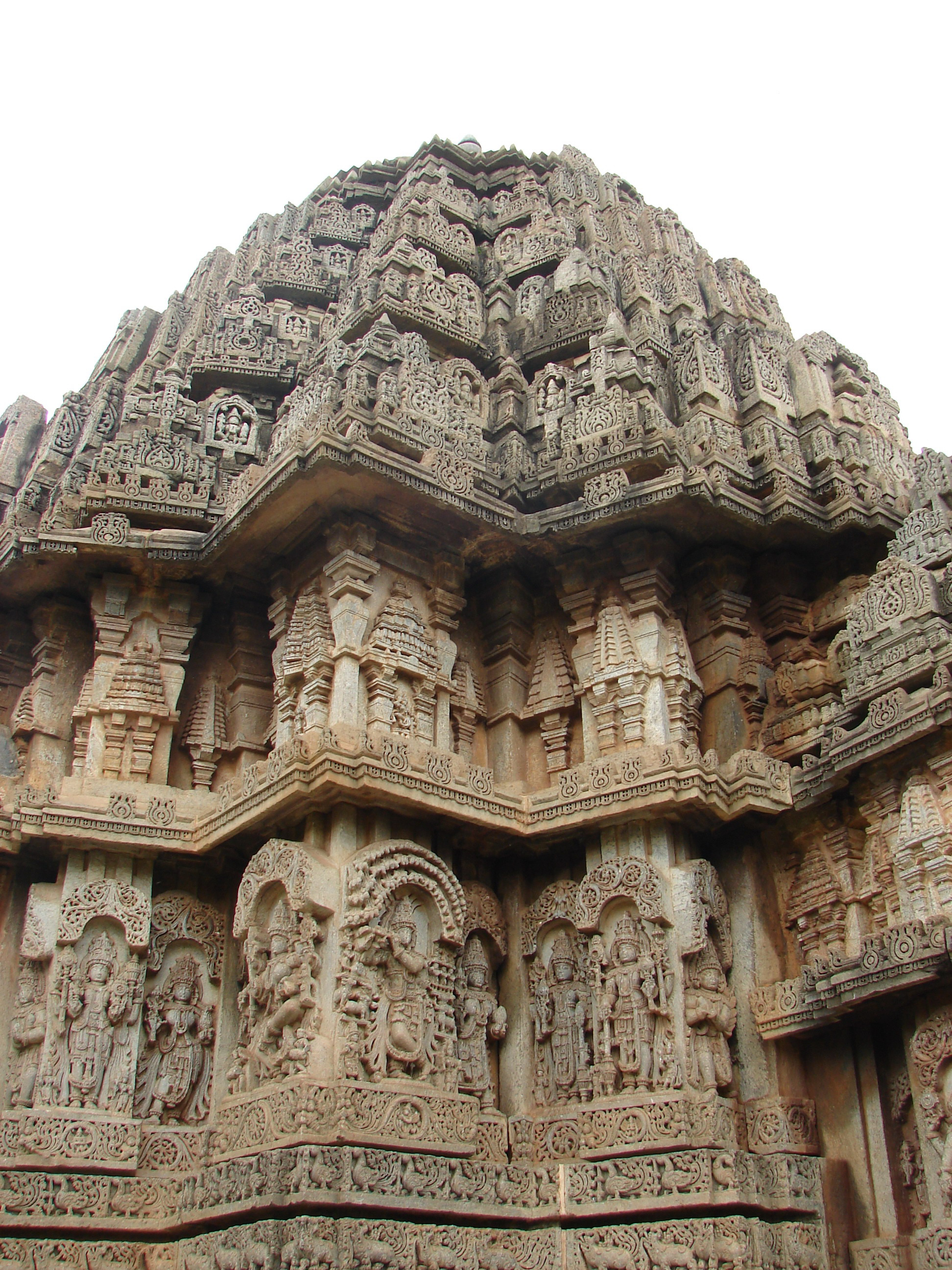
Star shaped Vimana (shrine) at Hosaholalu

The vimana, also called the cella, contains the most sacred shrine wherein resides the image of the presiding deity. The vimana is often topped by a tower which is quite different on the outside than on the inside. Inside, the vimana is plain and square, whereas outside it is profusely decorated and can be either stellate ("star-shaped") or shaped as a staggered square, or feature a combination of these designs, giving it many projections and recesses that seem to multiply as the light falls on it. Each projection and recess has a complete decorative articulation that is rhythmic and repetitive and composed of blocks and mouldings, obscuring the tower profile. Depending on the number of shrines (and hence on the number of towers), the temples are classified as ekakuta (one), dvikuta (two), trikuta (three), chatushkuta (four) and panchakuta (five). Most Hoysala temples are ekakuta, dvikuta or trikuta, the Vaishnava ones mostly being trikuta. There are cases where a temple is trikuta but has only one tower over the main shrine (in the middle). So the terminology trikuta may not be literally accurate. In temples with multiple disconnected shrines, such as the twin temples at Mosale, all essential parts are duplicated for symmetry and balance.

The highest point of the temple (kalasa) has the shape of a water pot and stands on top of the tower. This portion of the vimana is often lost due to age and has been replaced with a metallic pinnacle. Below the kalasa is a large, highly- sculptured structure resembling a dome which is made from large stones and looks like a helmet. It may be 2 m by 2 m in size and follows the shape of the shrine. Below this structure are domed roofs in a square plan, all of them much smaller and crowned with small kalasas. They are mixed with other small roofs of different shapes and are ornately decorated. The tower of the shrine usually has three or four tiers of rows of decorative roofs while the tower on top of the sukanasi has one less tier, making the tower look like an extension of the main tower (Foekema calls it the "nose"). One decorated roof tier runs on top of the wall of a closed mantapa above the heavy eaves of an open mantapa and above the porches.

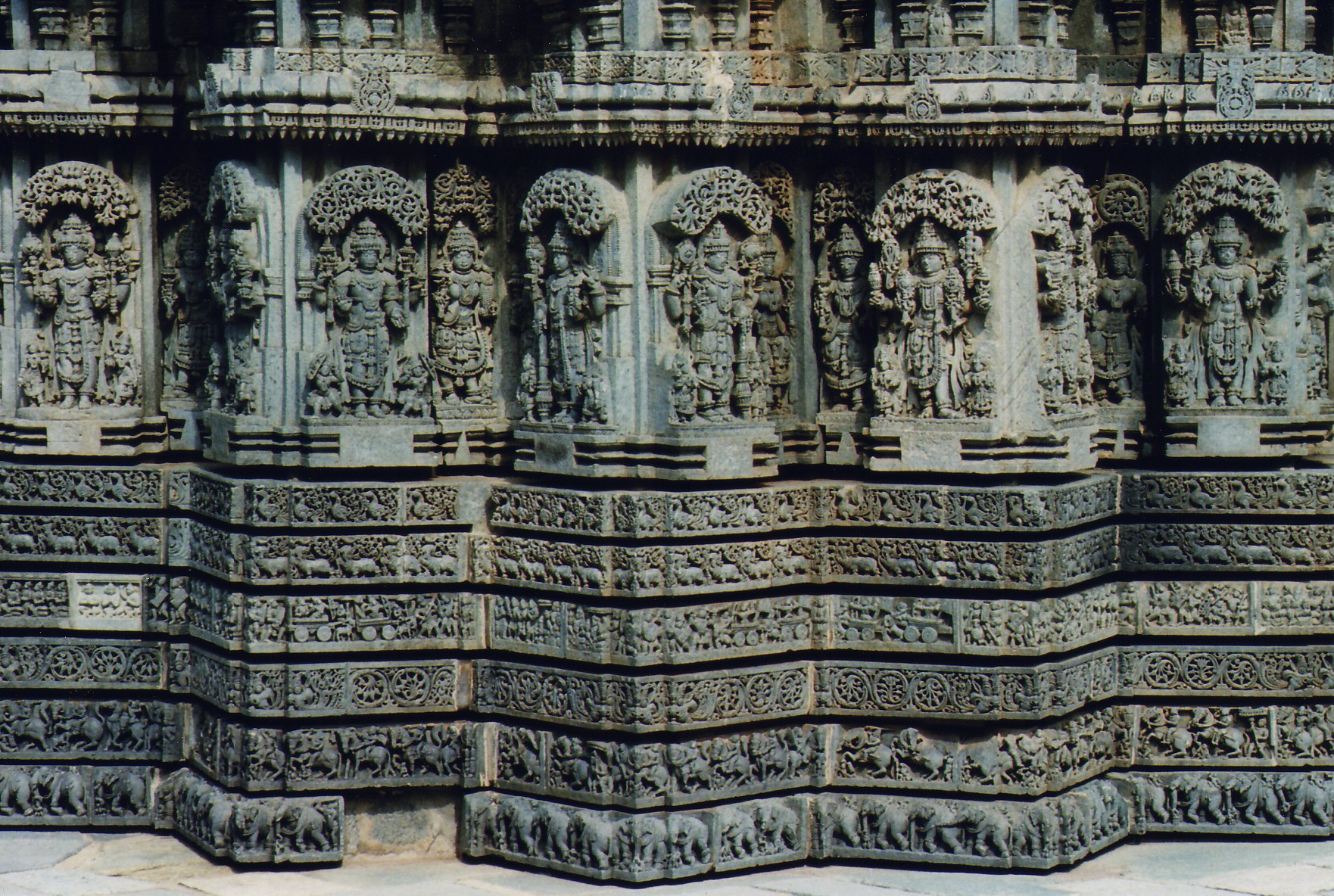
Outer wall panel with six horizontal mouldings at Somanathapura

Below the superstructure of the vimana are temple "eaves" projecting half a meter from the wall. Below the eaves two different decorative schemes may be found, depending on whether a temple was built in the early or the later period of the empire. In the early temples built prior to the 13th century, there is one eave and below this are decorative miniature towers. A panel of Hindu deities and their attendants are below these towers, followed by a set of five different mouldings forming the base of the wall. In the later temples there is a second eave running about a metre below the upper eaves with decorative miniature towers placed between them. The wall images of gods are below the lower eaves, followed by six different mouldings of equal size. This is broadly termed "horizontal treatment". The six mouldings at the base are divided in two sections. Going from the very base of the wall, the first horizontal layer contains a procession of elephants, above which are horsemen and then a band of foliage. The second horizontal section has depictions of the Hindu epics and Puranic scenes executed with detail. Above this are two friezes of yalis or makaras (imaginary beasts) and hamsas (swans). The vimana (tower) is divided into three horizontal sections and is even more ornate than the walls.

=== Sculpture ===
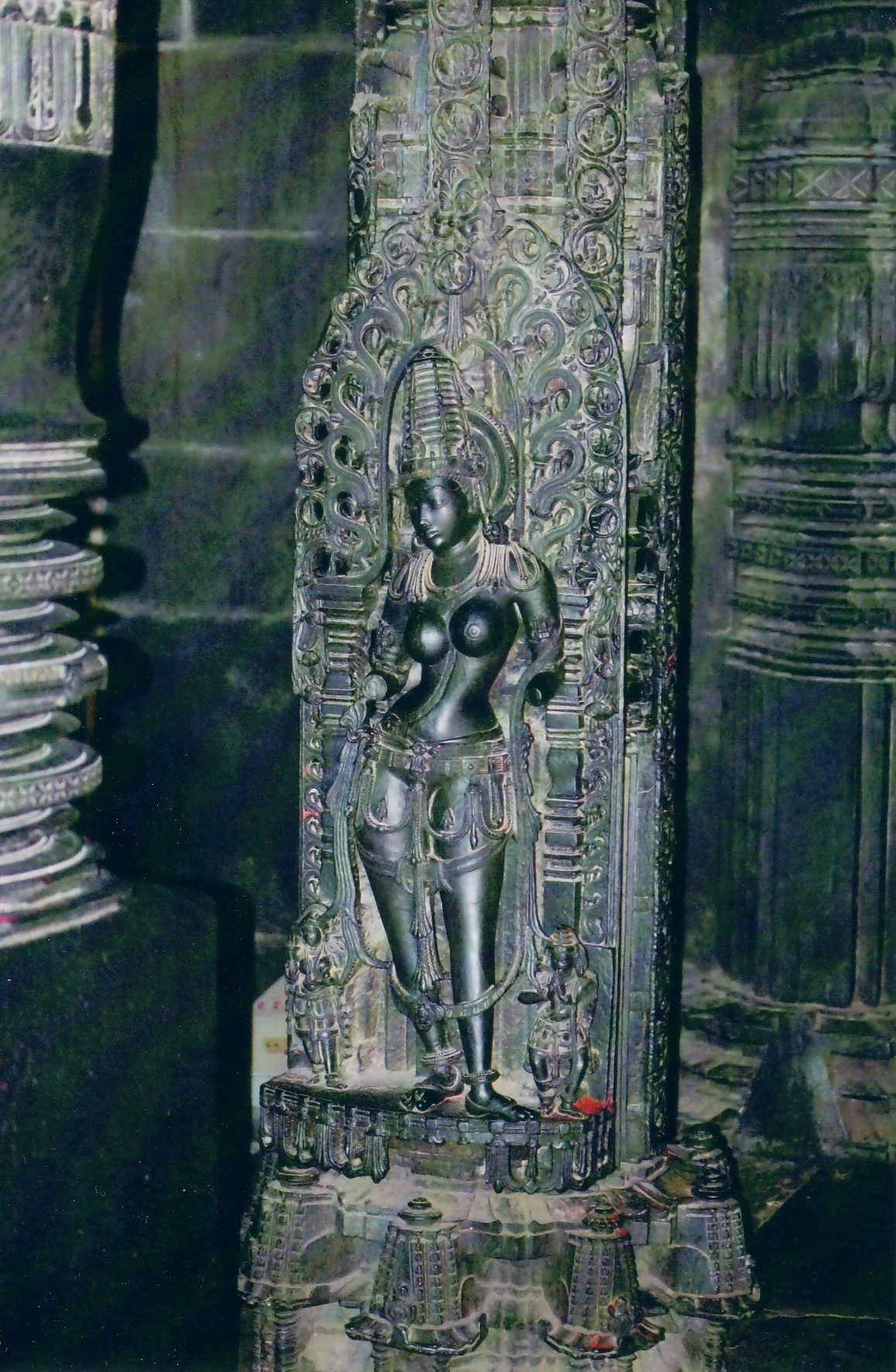
Sthamba buttalika, Hoysala art at Belur

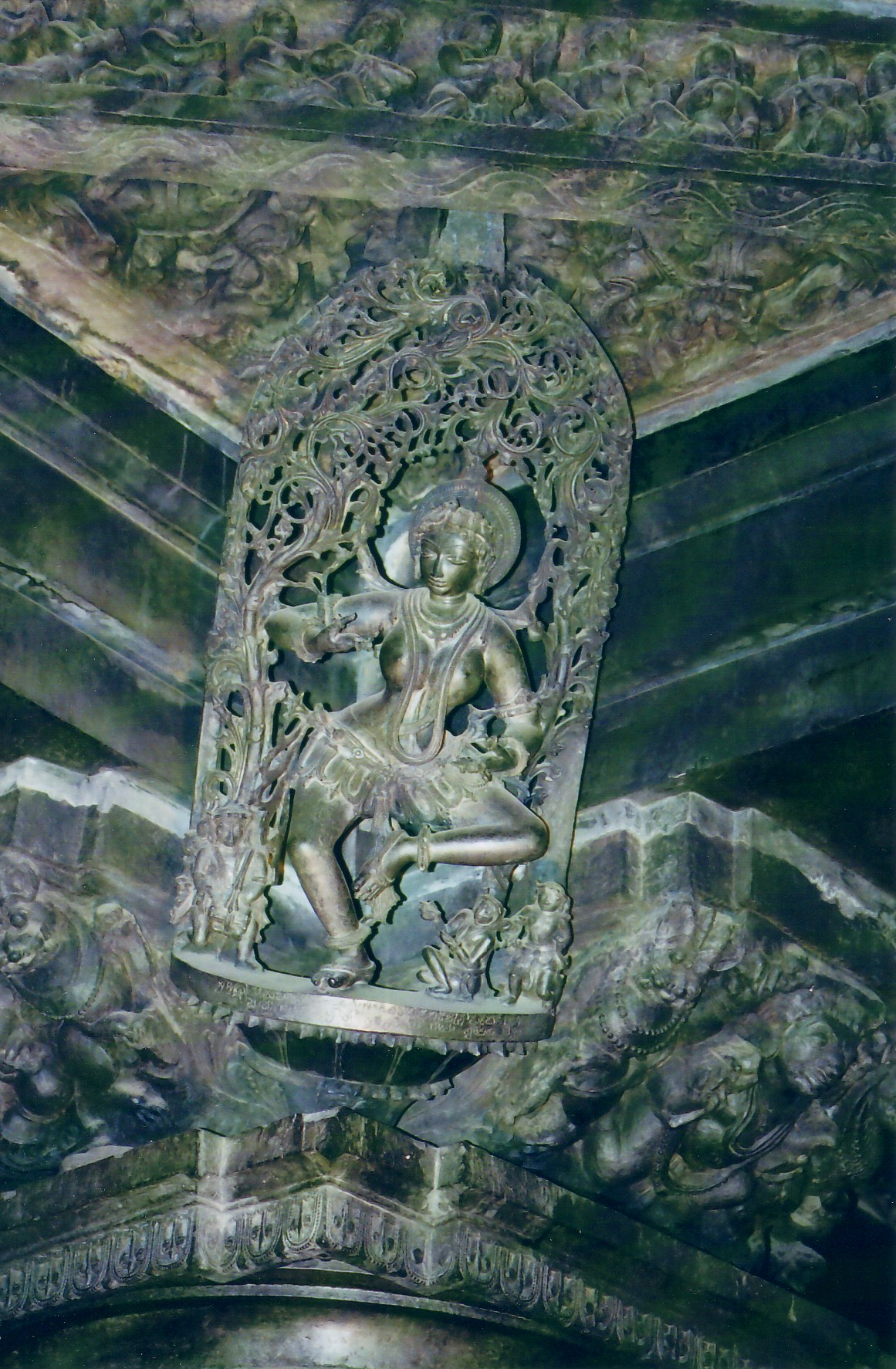
Madanika bracket at Belur

In Hoysala art Hardy identifies two conspicuous departures from the more austere Western (Later) Chalukya art:ornamental elaboration and a profusion of iconography with figure sculptures, both of which are found in abundance even on the superstructure over the shrine. Their medium, the soft chlorite schist (Soapstone) enabled a virtuoso carving style. Hoysala artists are noted for their attention to sculptural detail be it in the depiction of themes from the Hindu epics and deities or in their use of motifs such as yali, kirtimukha (gargoyles), aedicula (miniature decorative towers) on pilaster, makara (aquatic monster), birds (hamsa), spiral foliage, animals such as lions, elephants and horses, and even general aspects of daily life such as hair styles in vogue.

Salabhanjika, a common form of Hoysala sculpture, is an old Indian tradition going back to Buddhist sculpture. Sala is the sala tree and bhanjika is the chaste maiden. In the Hoysala idiom, madanika figures are decorative objects put at an angle on the outer walls of the temple near the roof so that worshipers circumambulating the temple can view them.

The sthamba buttalikas are pillar images that show traces of Chola art in the Chalukyan touches. Some of the artists working for the Hoysalas may have been from Chola country, a result of the expansion of the empire into Tamil-speaking regions of Southern India. The image of mohini on one of the pillars in the mantapa (closed hall) of the Chennakeshava temple is an example of Chola art.

General life themes are portrayed on wall panels such as the way horses were reined, the type of stirrup used, the depiction of dancers, musicians, instrumentalists, and rows of animals such as lions and elephants (where no two animals are identical). Perhaps no other temple in the country depicts the Ramayana and Mahabharata epics more effectively than the Hoysaleshwara temple at Halebidu.

Erotica was a subject the Hoysala artist handled with discretion. There is no exhibitionism in this, and erotic themes were carved into recesses and niches, generally miniature in form, making them inconspicuous. These erotic representations are associated with the Shakta practice.

Apart from these sculptures, entire sequences from the Hindu epics (commonly the Ramayana and the Mahabharata) have been sculpted in a clockwise direction starting at the main entrance. The right to left sequence is the same direction taken by the devotees in their ritual circumambulation as they wind inward toward the inner sanctum. Depictions from mythology such as the epic hero Arjuna shooting fish, the elephant-headed god Ganesha, the Sun god Surya, the weather and war god Indra, and Brahma with Sarasvati are common. Also frequently seen in these temples is Durga, with several arms holding weapons given to her by other gods, in the act of killing a buffalo (a demon in a buffalo's form) and Harihara (a fusion of Shiva and Vishnu) holding a conch, wheel, and trident. Many of these friezes were signed by the artisans, the first known instance of signed artwork in India.

== Research ==
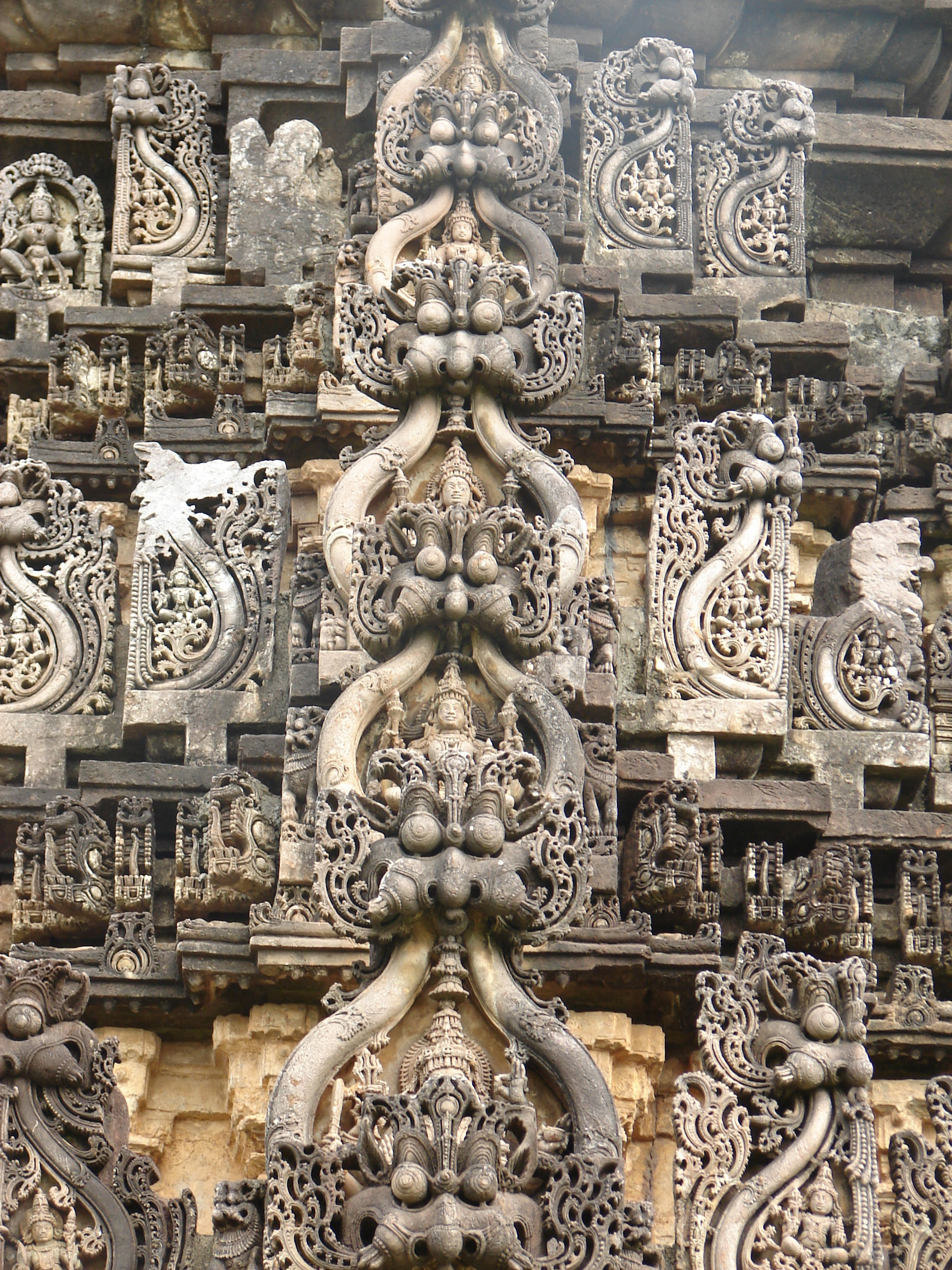
Kirtimukha decoration (demon faces) on tower at Amrutesvara Temple, Amruthapura

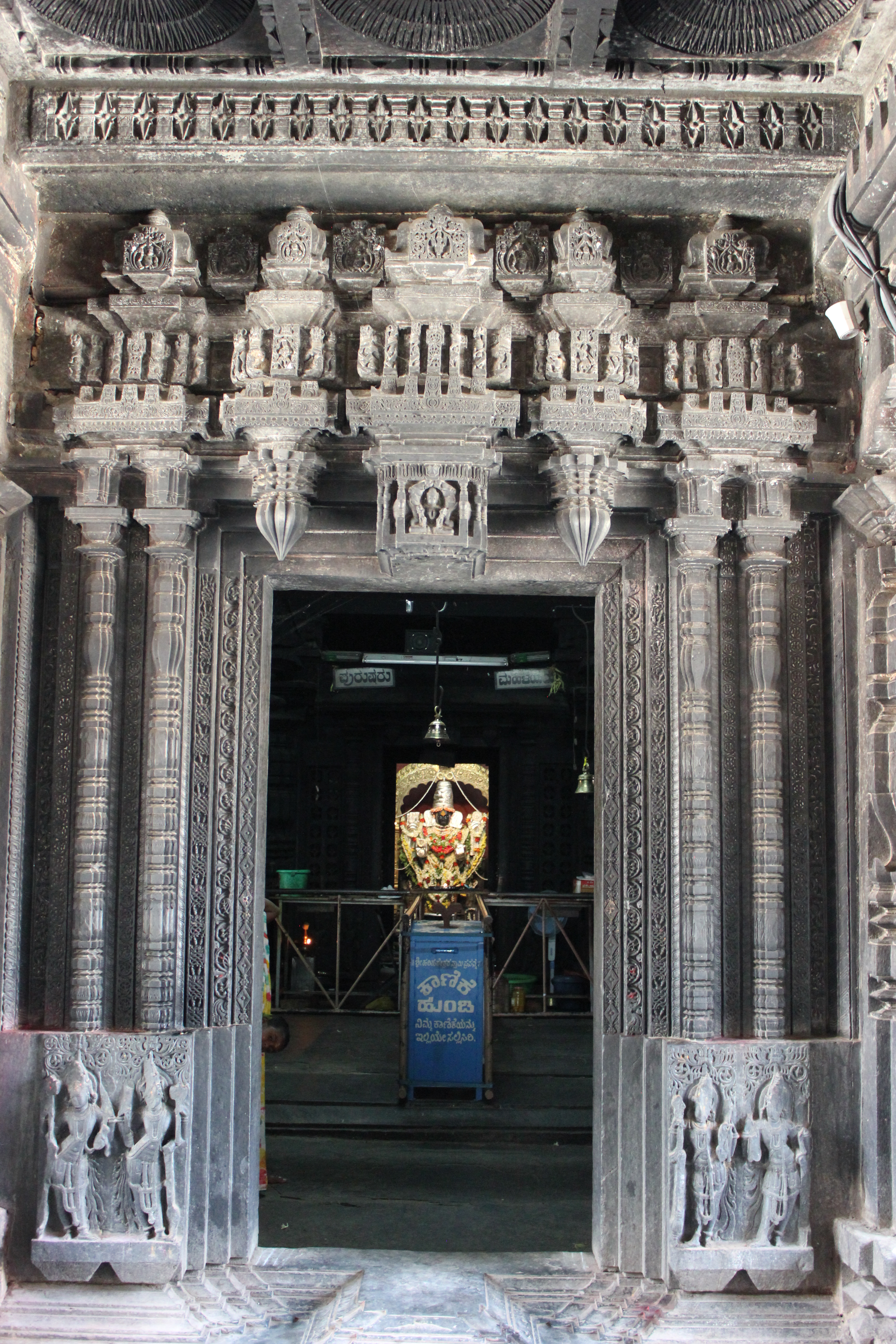
Ornate lintel and door jamb relief at entrance to inner mantapa in the Harihareshwara Temple at Harihar

According to Settar, surveys in modern times have indicated that 1000–1500 structures were built by the Hoysalas, of which about a hundred temples have survived to date. The Hoysala style is an offshoot of the Western Chalukya style, which was popular in the 10th and 11th centuries. It is distinctively Dravidian, and according to Brown, owing to its features, Hoysala architecture qualifies as an independent style. While the Hoysalas introduced innovative features into their architecture, they also borrowed features from earlier builders of Karnata like the Kadambas, Western Chalukyas. These features included the use of chloritic schist or soapstone as a basic building material.

Other features were the stepped style of vimana tower called the Kadamba shikhara, which was inherited from the Kadambas. Hoysala sculptors made use of the effect of light and shade on carved walls, which poses a challenge for photography of the temples. The artistry of the Hoysalas in stone has been compared to the finesse of an ivory worker or a goldsmith. The abundance of jewellery worn by the sculpted figures and the variety of hairstyles and headdresses depicted give a fair idea of the lifestyles of the Hoysala times.

== Notable craftsmen ==
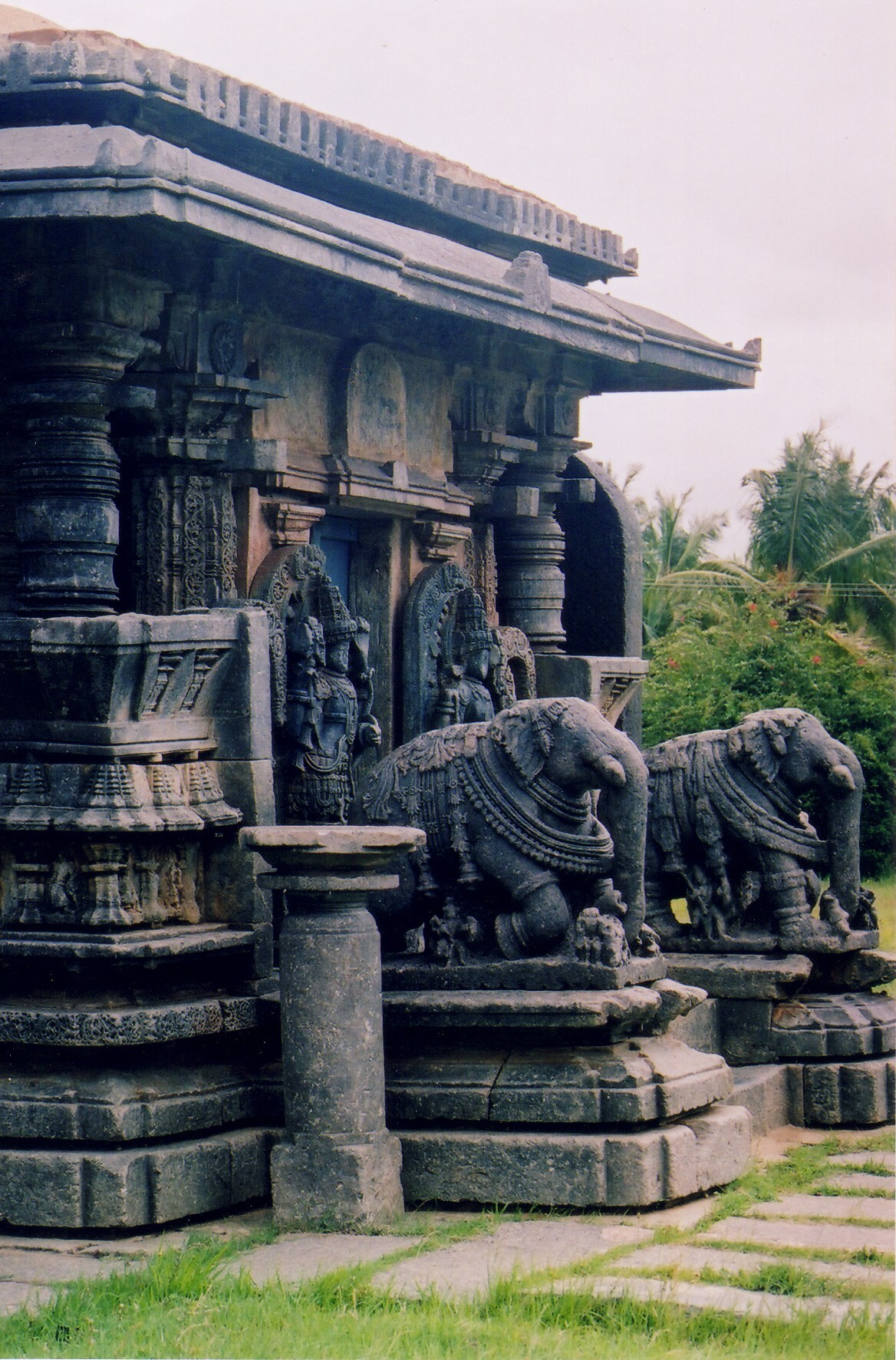
Elephant balustrades in the Bucesvara temple. A temple plan without jagati at Korvangla

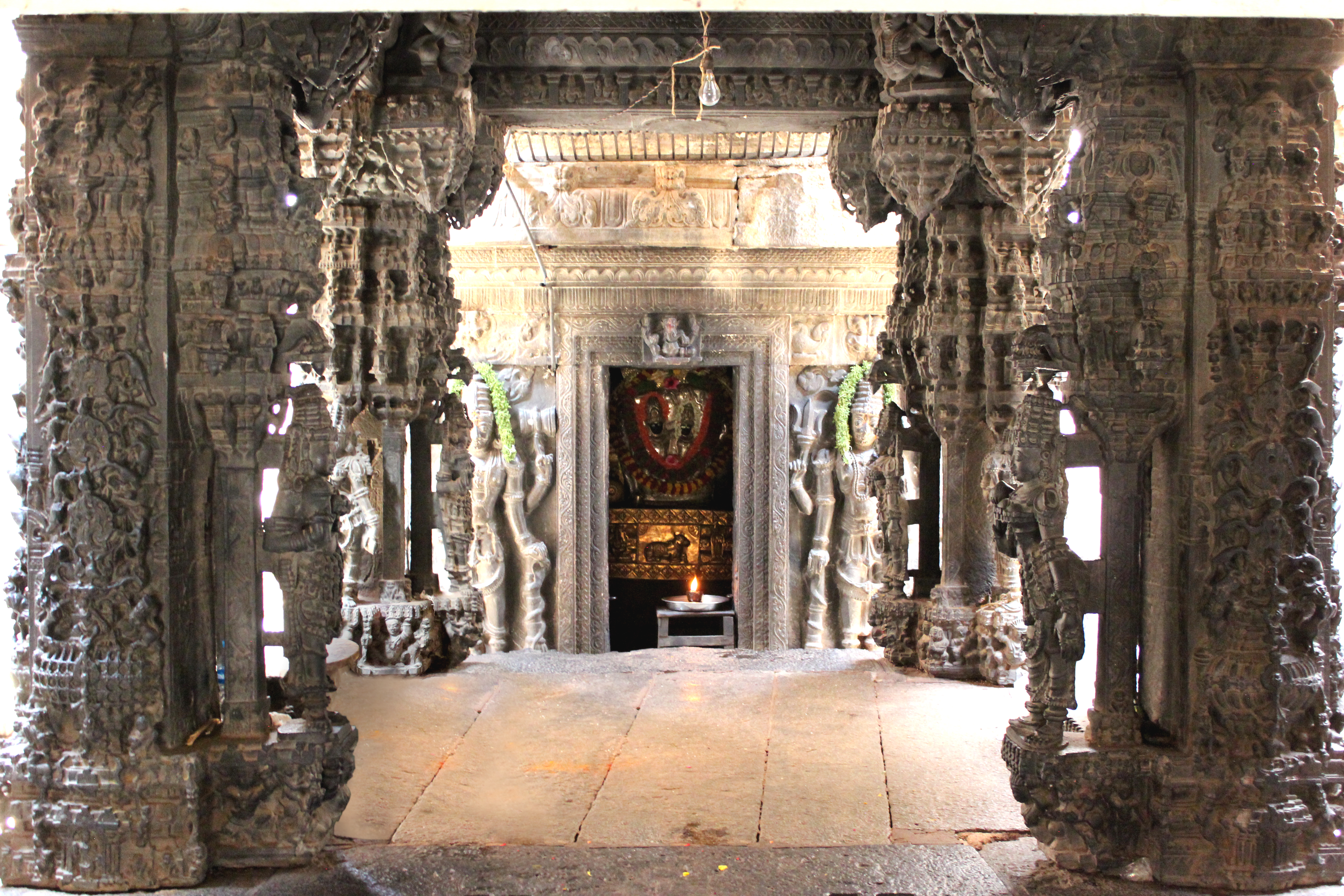
Vasantha mantapa, an ornate 13th century contribution from the Hoysala era to the pre-existing Uma-Maheshvara shrine at the Bhoga Nandeeshwara Temple complex, Chikkaballapura district

While medieval Indian artisans preferred to remain anonymous, Hoysala artisans signed their works, which has given researchers details about their lives, families, guilds, etc. Apart from the architects and sculptors, people of other guilds such as goldsmiths, ivory carvers, carpenters, and silversmiths also contributed to the completion of temples. The artisans were from diverse geographical backgrounds and included famous locals. Prolific architects included Amarashilpi Jakanachari, a native of Kaidala in Tumkur district, who also built temples for the Western Chalukyas. Ruvari Malithamma built the Kesava Temple at Somanathapura and worked on forty other monuments, including the Amruteshwara temple at Amruthapura. Malithamma specialised in ornamentation, and his works span six decades. His sculptures were typically signed in shorthand as Malli or simply Ma.

Dasoja and his son Chavana from Balligavi were the architects of Chennakesava Temple at Belur; Kedaroja was the chief architect of the Hoysaleswara Temple at Halebidu. Their influence is seen in other temples built by the Hoysalas as well. Names of other locals found in inscriptions are Maridamma, Baicoja, Caudaya, Nanjaya and Bama, Malloja, Nadoja, Siddoja, Masanithamma, Chameya and Rameya. Artists from Tamil country included Pallavachari and Cholavachari.

== List of notable temples from the Hoysala era ==
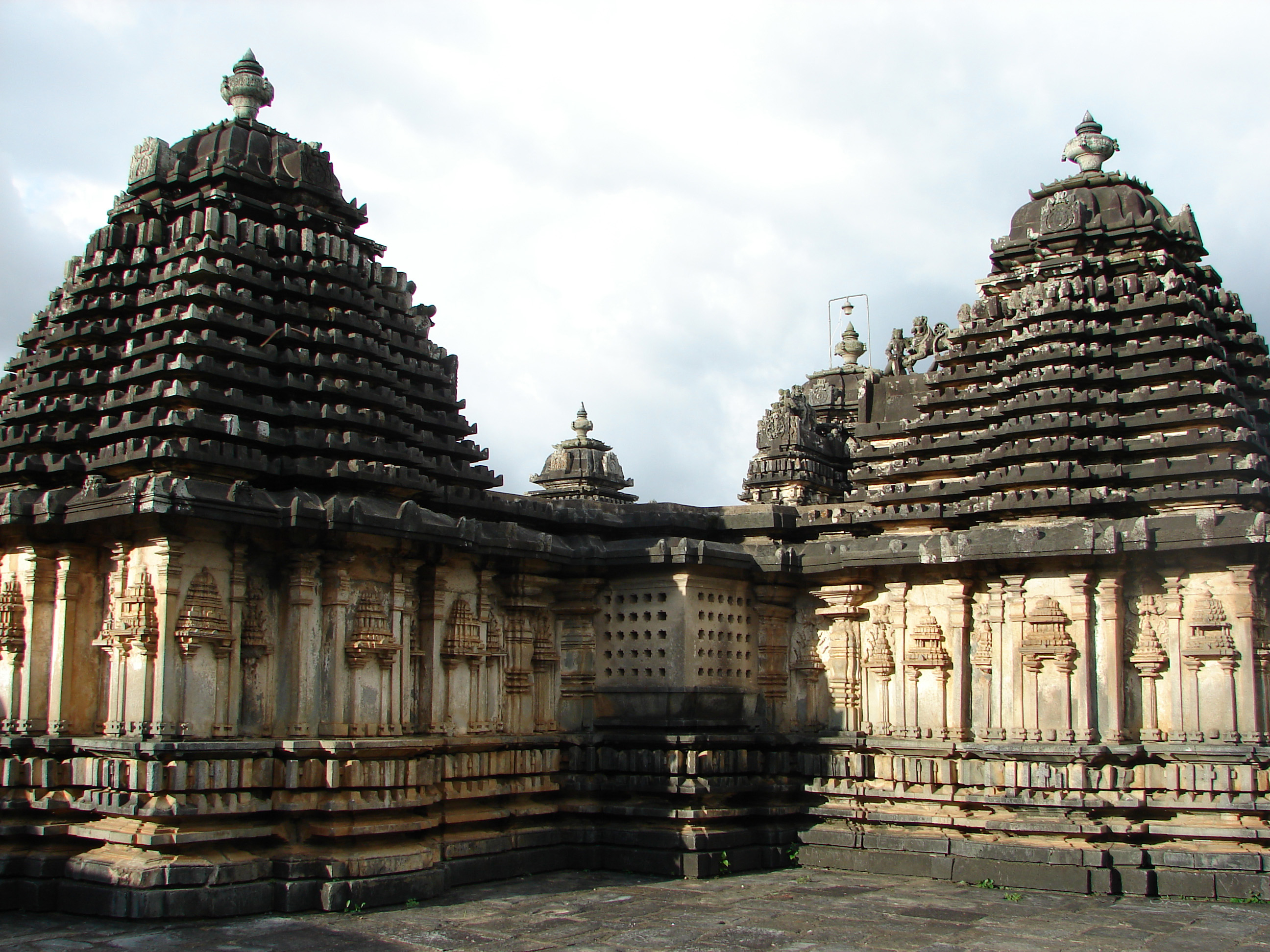
Kadamba shikara (tower)with Kalasa (pinnacle) on top at Lakshmi Devi Temple, Doddagaddavalli

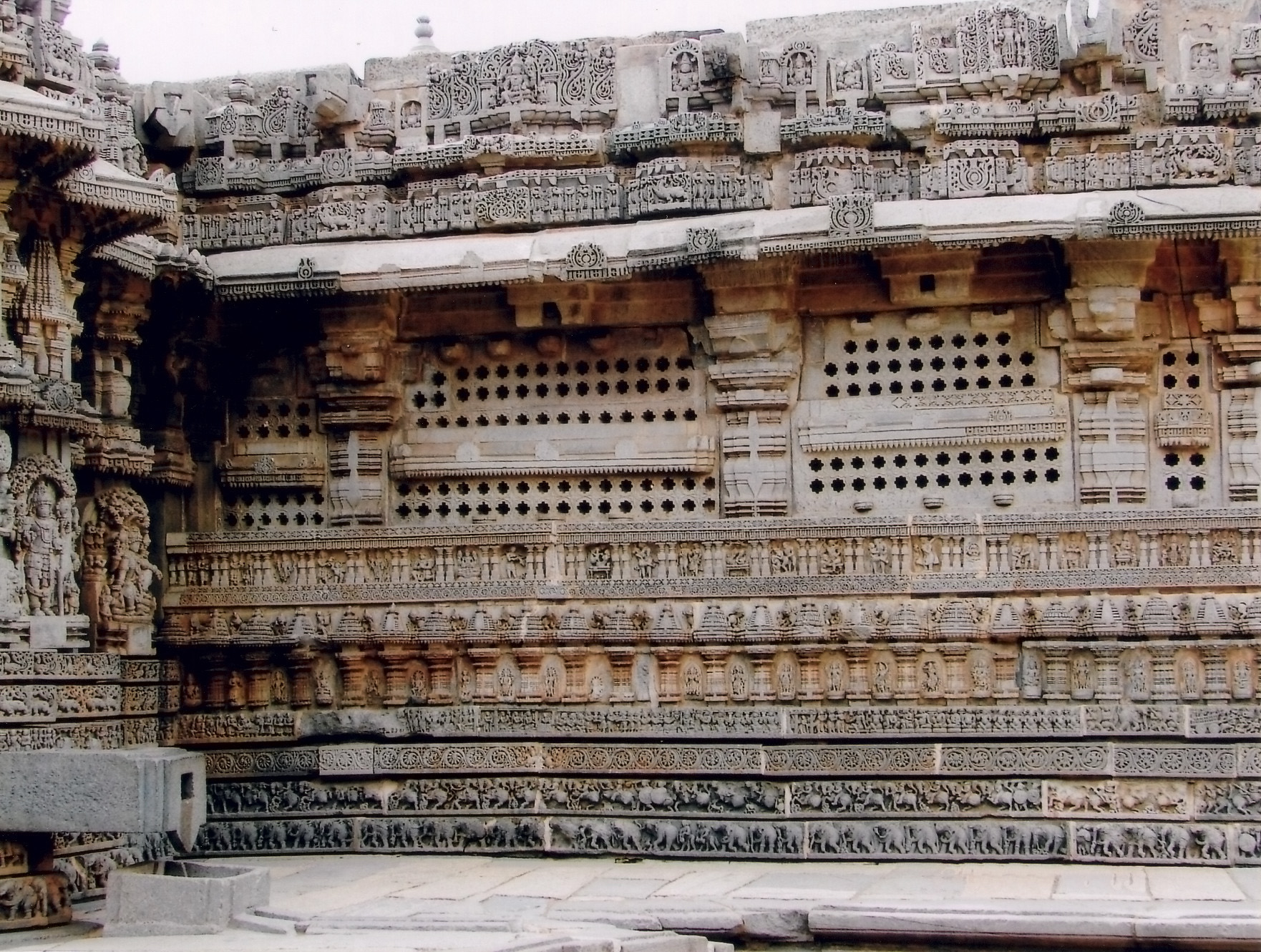
Pierced stone window screens at Somanathapura

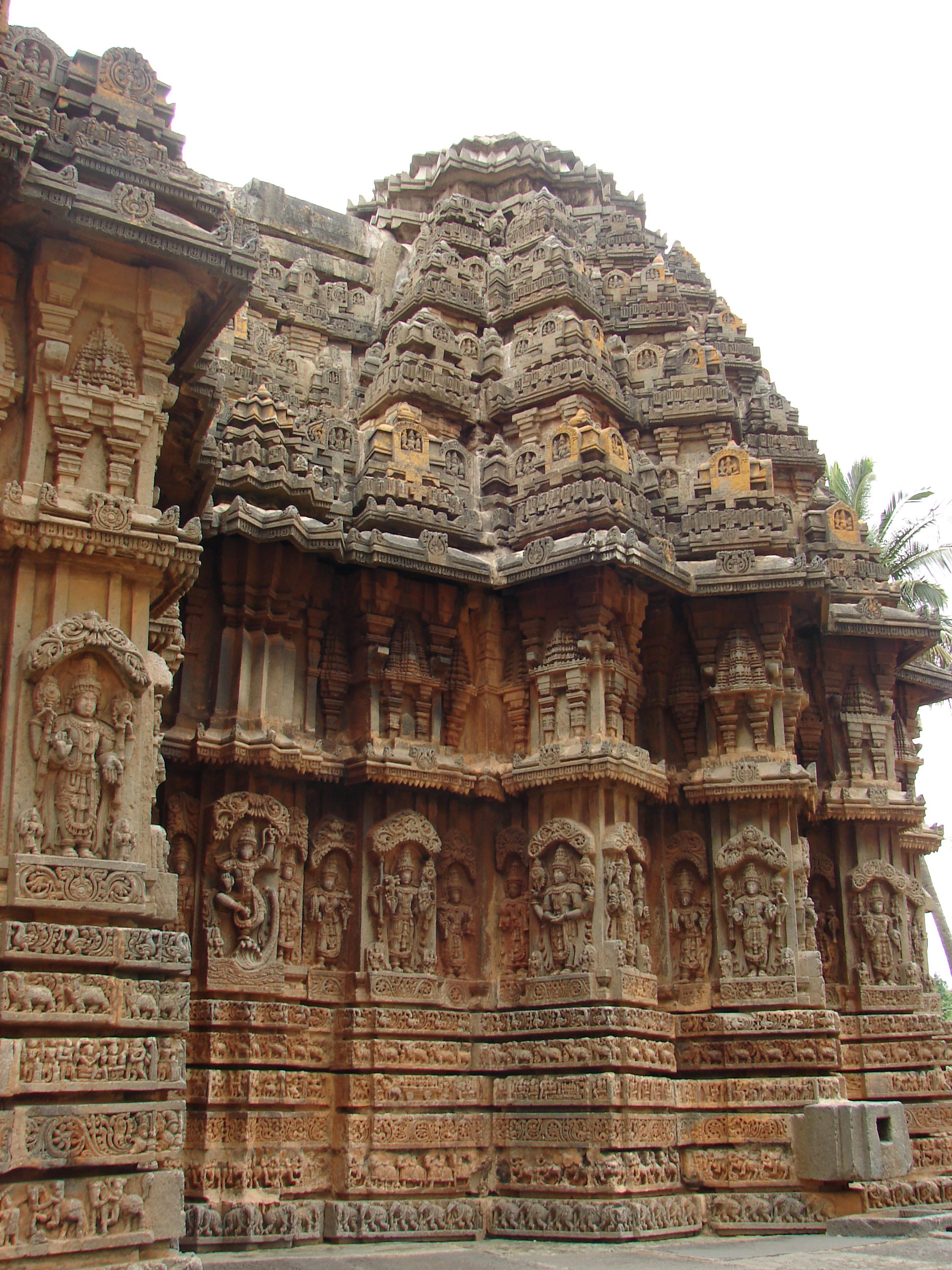
Stellate plan of shrine in Chennakeshava Temple, Aralaguppe, Karnataka

Name	Location	Period	King	Deity
Lakshmidevi	Doddagaddavalli	1113	Vishnuvardhana	Lakshmi
Chennakesava	Belur	1117	Vishnuvardhana	Vishnu
Hoysaleswara	Halebidu	1120	Vishnuvardhana	Shiva
Basadi complex	Halebidu	1133, 1196	Vishnuvardhana, Veera Ballala II	Parshvanatha, Shantinatha, Adinatha
Rameshvara	Koodli	12th c.	Vishnuvardhana	Shiva
Brahmeshwara	Kikkeri	1171	Narasimha I	Shiva
Bucheshvara	Koravangala	1173	Veera Ballala II	Shiva
Akkana Basadi	Shravanabelagola	1181	Veera Ballala II	Parshvanatha
Amruteshwara	Amruthapura	1196	Veera Ballala II	Shiva
Shantinatha Basadi	Jinanathapura	1200	Veera Ballala II	Shantinatha
Nageshvara-Chennakeshava	Mosale	1200	Veera Ballala II	Shiva, Vishnu
Veeranarayana	Belavadi	1200	Veera Ballala II	Vishnu
Kedareshwara	Halebidu	1200	Veera Ballala II	Shiva
Ishvara (Shiva)	Arsikere	1220	Veera Ballala II	Shiva
Harihareshwara	Harihar	1224	Vira Narasimha II	Shiva, Vishnu
Mallikarjuna	Basaralu	1234	Vira Narasimha II	Shiva
Someshvara	Haranhalli	1235	Vira Someshwara	Shiva
Lakshminarasimha	Haranhalli	1235	Vira Someshwara	Vishnu
Panchalingeshwara	Govindanhalli	1238	Vira Someshwara	Shiva
Lakshminarasimha	Nuggehalli	1246	Vira Someshwara	Vishnu
Sadashiva	Nuggehalli	1249	Vira Someshwara	Shiva
Lakshminarayana	Hosaholalu	1250	Vira Someshwara	Vishnu
Lakshminarasimha	Javagallu	1250	Vira Someshwara	Vishnu
Chennakesava	Aralaguppe	1250	Vira Someshwara	Vishnu
Kesava	Somanathapura	1268	Narasimha III	Vishnu

== See also ==
- Architecture of India
- Vijayanagara architecture
