= Ishvara Temple, Arasikere =

Isvara temple at Arsikere
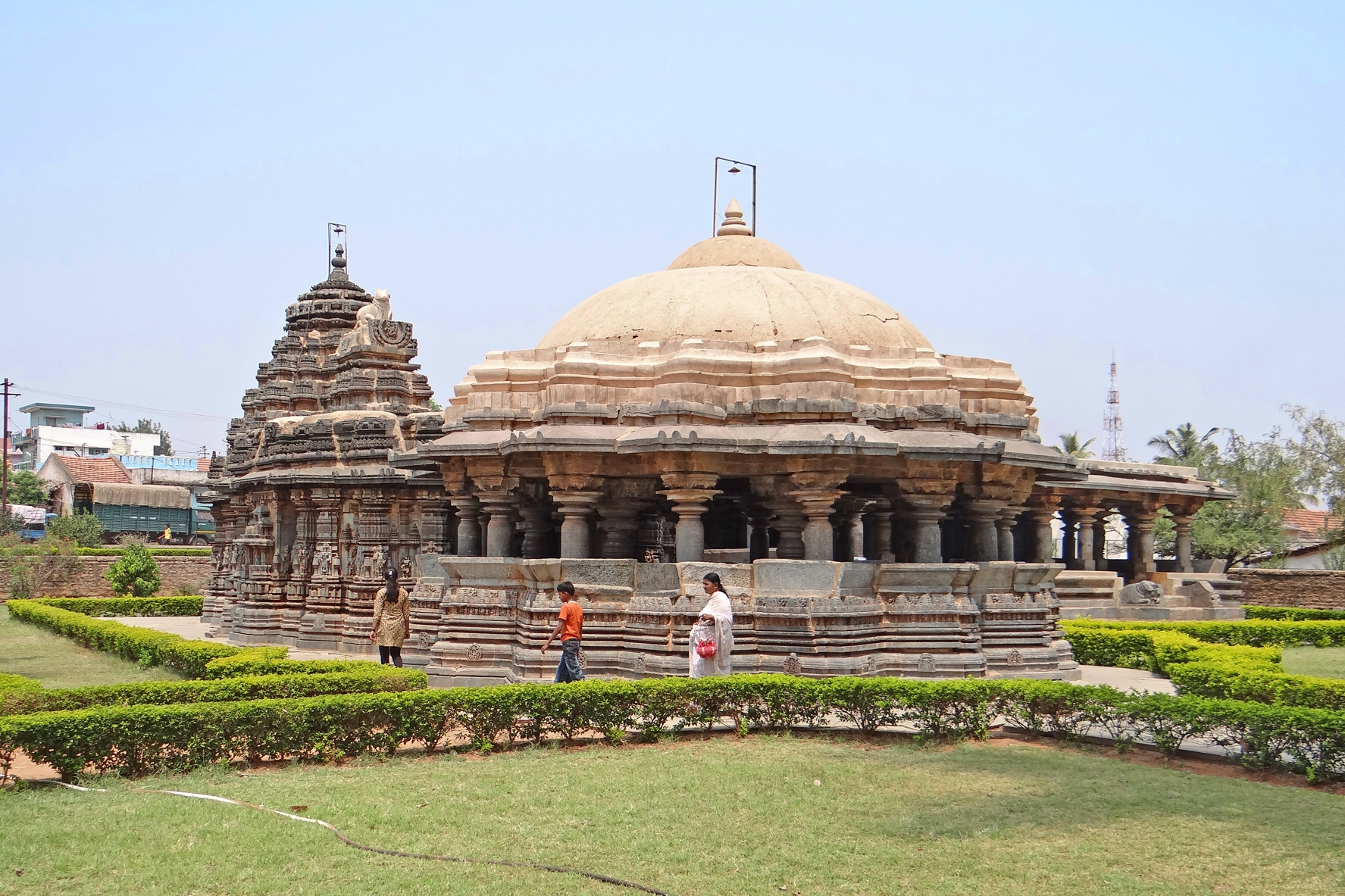

- Location within India Location within Karnataka

Religion
- Affiliation: Hinduism
- District: Hassan
- Deity: Shiva

Location
- Location: Arsikere
- State: Karnataka
- Country: India
- Interactive map of Isvara temple at Arsikere
- Coordinates: 13°19′06″N 76°15′36″E

Architecture
- Type: Hoysala
- Creator: unknown, Narasimha II
- Completed: c. 1220 CE

The Ishvara temple, also referred to as the Ishwara or Isvara temple, is an early 13th-century Hindu temple in Arsikere, Hassan district, Karnataka India. Dedicated to Shiva, it is one of the most notable early Hoysala architecture examples with a rotating circular plan, a domed mandapa with a 16-point star shape, a pancatala vimana, and a galaxy of artwork depicting Shaivism, Vaishnavism, Shaktism and Vedic legends of Hinduism.

The Ishvara temple was one among a complex of many Hindu temples in Arasikere. Most of these and their artwork were destroyed and mutilated in or after the 14th-century. Along with the Ishvara temple, a simpler and more damaged double temple (Shivalaya) survives and is to the immediate north of the Ishvara temple within the current compound. This double temple has red-stone pillars. About 200 meters to the southwest of the Ishvara temple is the Sahasrakuta Jinalaya – a ruined and mutilated monument of Jainism.

The Ishvara temple is protected as a monument of national importance by the Archaeological Survey of India.

== Location and date ==
Arasikere, also referred to as Arsikere or Arsiyakere in historic Indian texts, is located about 41 kilometres (25 mi) east of Hassan city and about 140 kilometres (87 mi) north of Mysuru city. It is at the southwestern edge of the Nagapuri forest and hills, connected to India's national highway network through NH 73. The Isvara temple is located on the northeastern side of the town. Arasikere (lit "Queens tank") is derived from Arasi, which means "queen" or "princess" and kere means "tank" in the Kannada language.

The temple has several inscribed stones, as well as hero stones. None provide the foundation information to help date this temple. However, given the references in these available inscriptions, this temple must have been in existence during the reign of Narasimha II of the Hoysala dynasty, by about 1220 CE. Further, these same inscriptions suggest the Ishvara temple was one among much bigger complex of temples, and that the Shiva linga inside this temple was referred to as Kattamesvara. The temples were active till the early 14th-century, given the evidence of gifts and donations mentioned in the inscriptions. In a survey completed in 1918 by a team of British and Indian archaeologists, the team reported another inscription – Arsikere Inscription #84 – that helps establish that the double temple to the left of the Ishvara temple was also in existence by 1220 CE. They reported witnessing numerous mutilated figures of Durga, Ganesha, Mahisasuramardini and others, as well as scattered sections of "some temple which is no longer in existence".

== Architecture ==
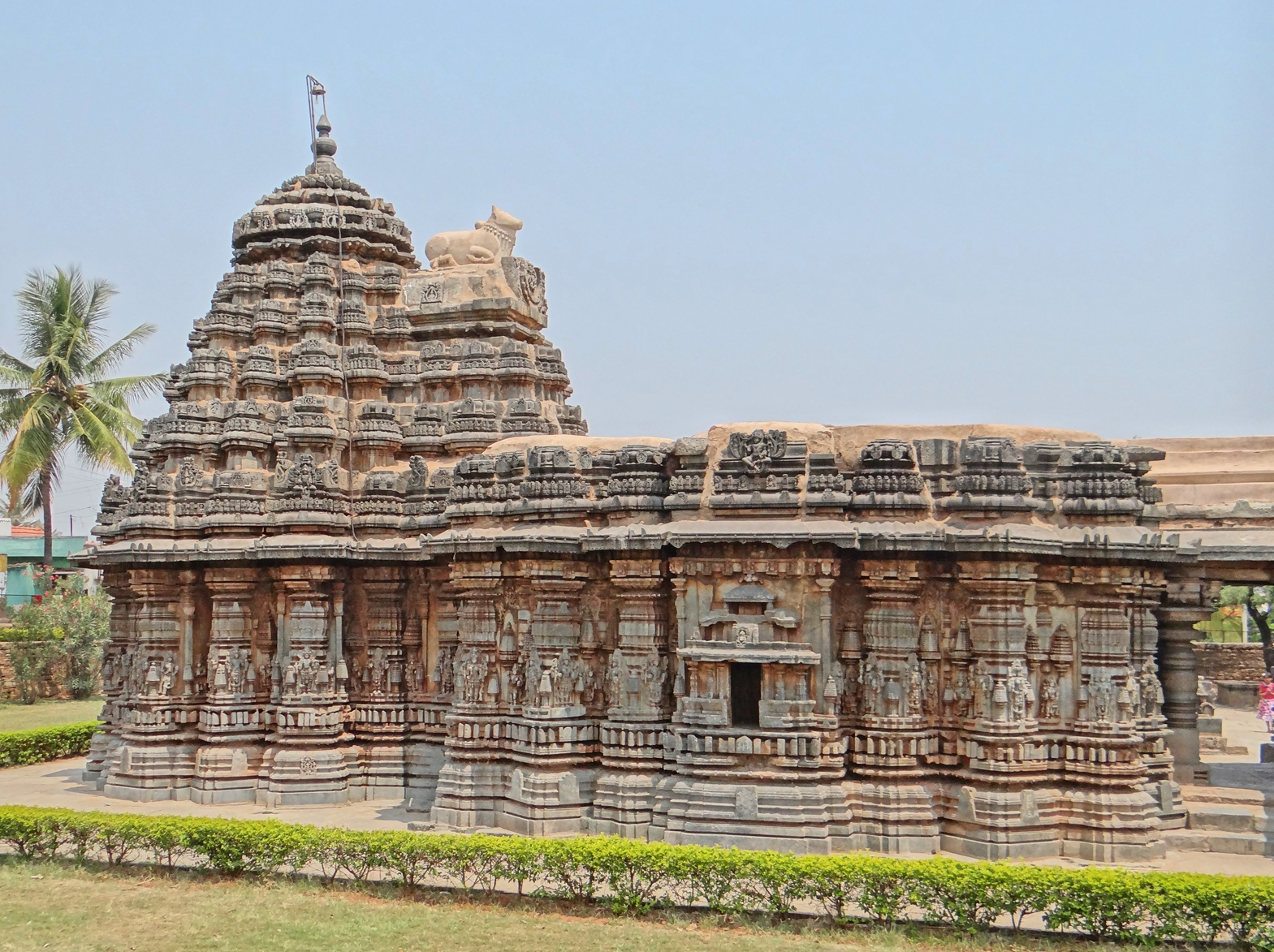
The Vimana and ranga-mandapa walls of the Isvara temple

The Ishvara temple was constructed using soapstone. It is modest in size, yet with a sophisticated architecture because of its ground plan: a 16-point star-shaped mantapa (hall) and a stellate shrine with each corner distinct. According to Dhaky, a scholar of temple architecture and history, the temple "ranks among the most notable of the Hoysala times". Foekema calls it "exceptionally intricate".

The temple faces east. It has an open navaranga and a mukha-mantapa with a round dome on top, likely one with a seated Nandi (now missing). This open mandapa is supported on 21 pillars, of which 8 are towards the middle and decorated, while the outer 13 pillars have a pair of elephants near their base. There is a square outer porch. The open mantapa (mandapa, hall), is a deep concentric joist-and rafter ceiling with an inverted lotus, states Dhaky, and this is so crafted that it successfully simulates a timber appearance. The architect provided an integrated stone bench along the sides of the open mandapa for pilgrims to gather and sit. Inside is another closed gudha-mantapa. The gudha-mandapa is a 20 feet by 20 feet square. The ceiling of this closed mantapa is supported by four lathe turned pillars.

The square sanctum (garbhagriha) enshrines a Shiva linga. Its doorway is beautifully carved with five sakhas with scrolls, geometric patterns, and standing lions. The lintel lalitabimba has Gajalakshmi. Above it is a panel with (left to right): Vishnu, Kartikeya (also known as Subramanyam, Murugan, Skanda), Shiva in the middle flanked with lions, Ganesha and Brahma. The sukhanasi above the sanctum has a Nataraja (Tandavesvara) with musicians near him. The vimana has five storeys (pancatalas). It is based on a rotating circular plan with two pallavis – bifacial-equilateral and stellate, together they compose the dramatic and charming symmetry of the superstructure, states Dhaky. The jangha section below are flanked by kuta-stambhas and contain Hindu deities. This scheme wraps around the walls of the gudha-mandapa, to enhance the visual aesthetics of the temple. The reliefs therein include various forms of Shiva, the Saptamatrikas (seven mother goddesses), the avatars of Vishnu, Ganesha, Surya, Parvati, Lakshmi and Sarasvati – thus, presenting the galaxy of Hindu legends and traditions. The walls thus display 120 reliefs, of which 62 are female and 58 are male.

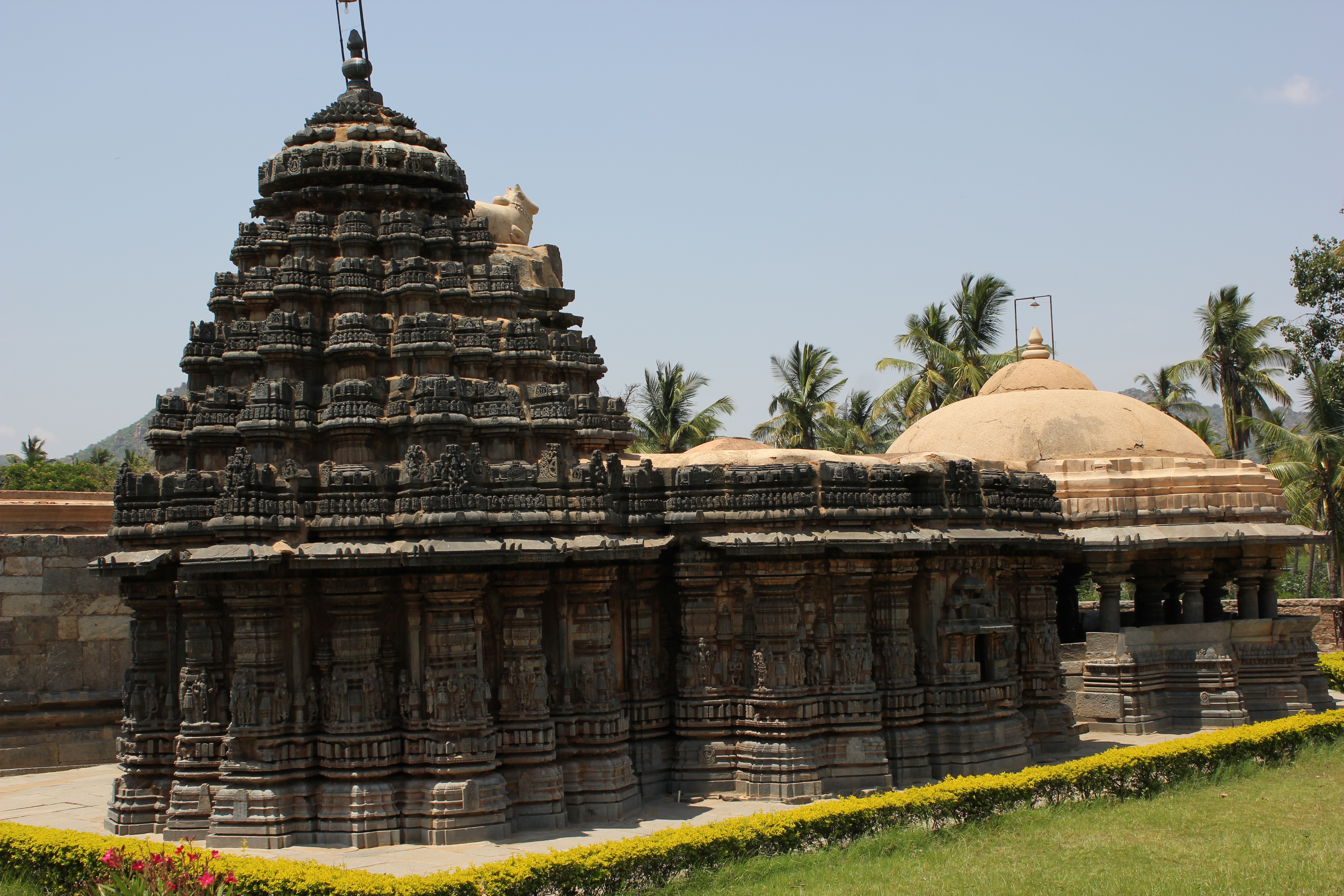
Rear view of the Ishvara temple at Arasikere

The outer wall of the vestibule shares the same decoration as the outer wall of the shrine, but is inconspicuous because it forms a short continuation between the wall of the shrine and that of closed mantapa. The outer wall of the shrine is stellate, but the star points are not identical, rather they form three different kinds of star points, making the design complicated and unusual. The lower half of the outer wall of the shrine and the outer wall of the closed mantapa share the same architectural articulation. The open hall, with its 16-pointed star plan is unusual. The central ceiling in the closed mantapa and the vestibule are decorated elaborately.

Both the interior and exterior of the temple shows high workmanship. The elegantly decorated ceilings, the domical ceiling of the open mantapa, the sculptures of Dwarapalakas (door keepers) in the closed mantapa (also called navaranga), the wall panel images numbering a hundred and twenty (on pilasters between the aedicules–miniature decorative towers) carved on the outer walls are noteworthy, states Foekema.

The temple has seen some modern era modification. For example, near the Sukhanasi is a stuccoed figure of seated Nandi made of bricks – not the material of choice for the entire temple. Typically, one would expect the Hoysala crest instead, but this was likely damaged or destroyed long ago.

Other monuments

To the immediate north of Ishvara temple is a double temple with a shared hall. The two sanctums have Shiva linga, while the hall is supported on 24 red stone pillars with 21 ceiling niches, all with lotus. The double temple is simpler in design and decoration. During the 1918 survey, the hall had ruined and mutilated sections such as those of Ganesha. Outside too, in the field near the temples were mutilated portions of Durga, Vishnu, dancing Ganapati, Mahisasuramardini and others. A ruined Jinalaya (Jain temple) about 200 meters to the southwest of the Ishvara temple contains a mountain icon with 1000 Jina, giving it the name Sahasrakuta Jinalaya. This Jain temple was built along with the Ishvara temple, according to the inscriptions, and thus dated to about 1220 CE.

== Gallery ==
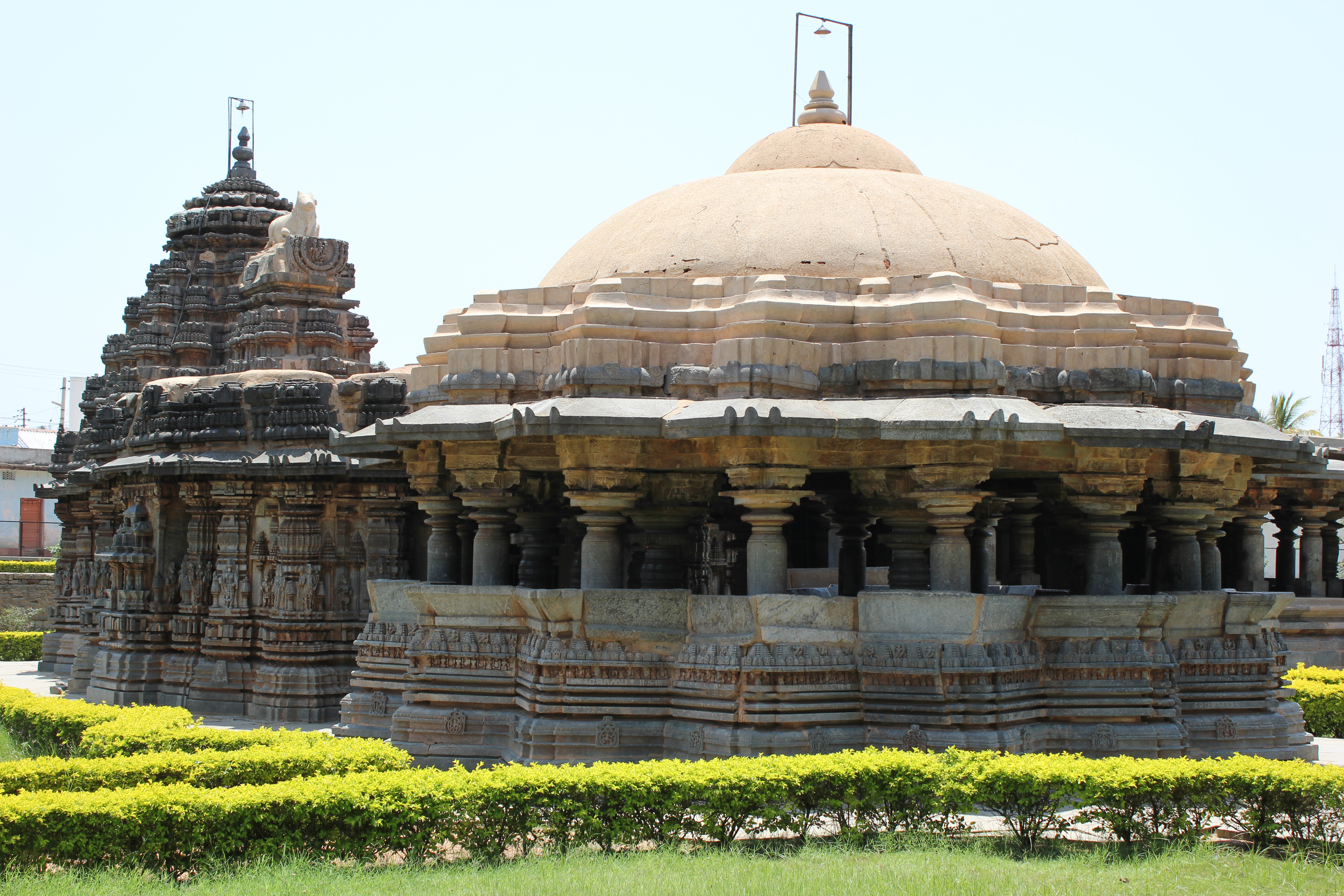
The 16-pointed stellate (star-shaped) mantapa hall

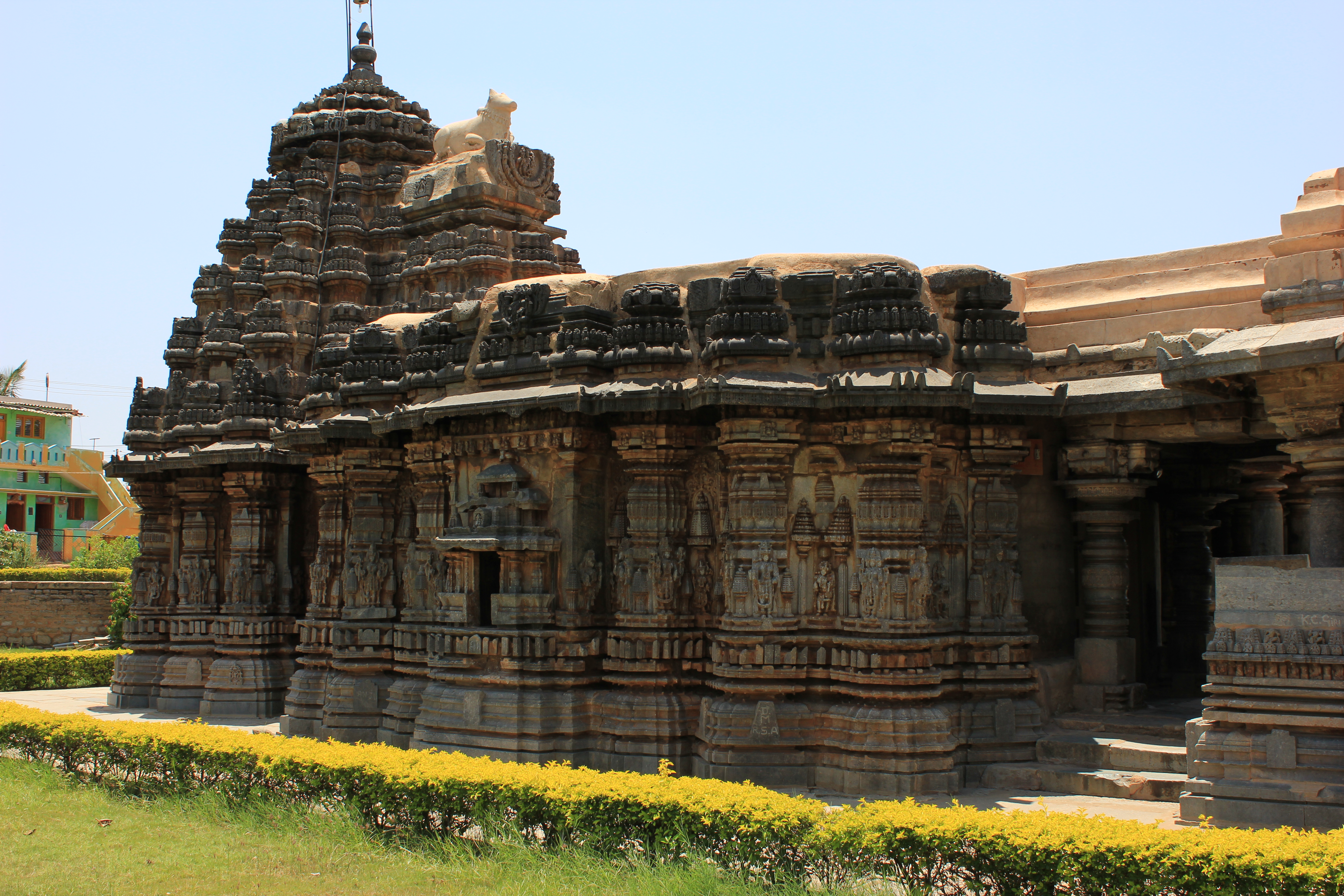
Front profile of Ishvara temple at Arasikere

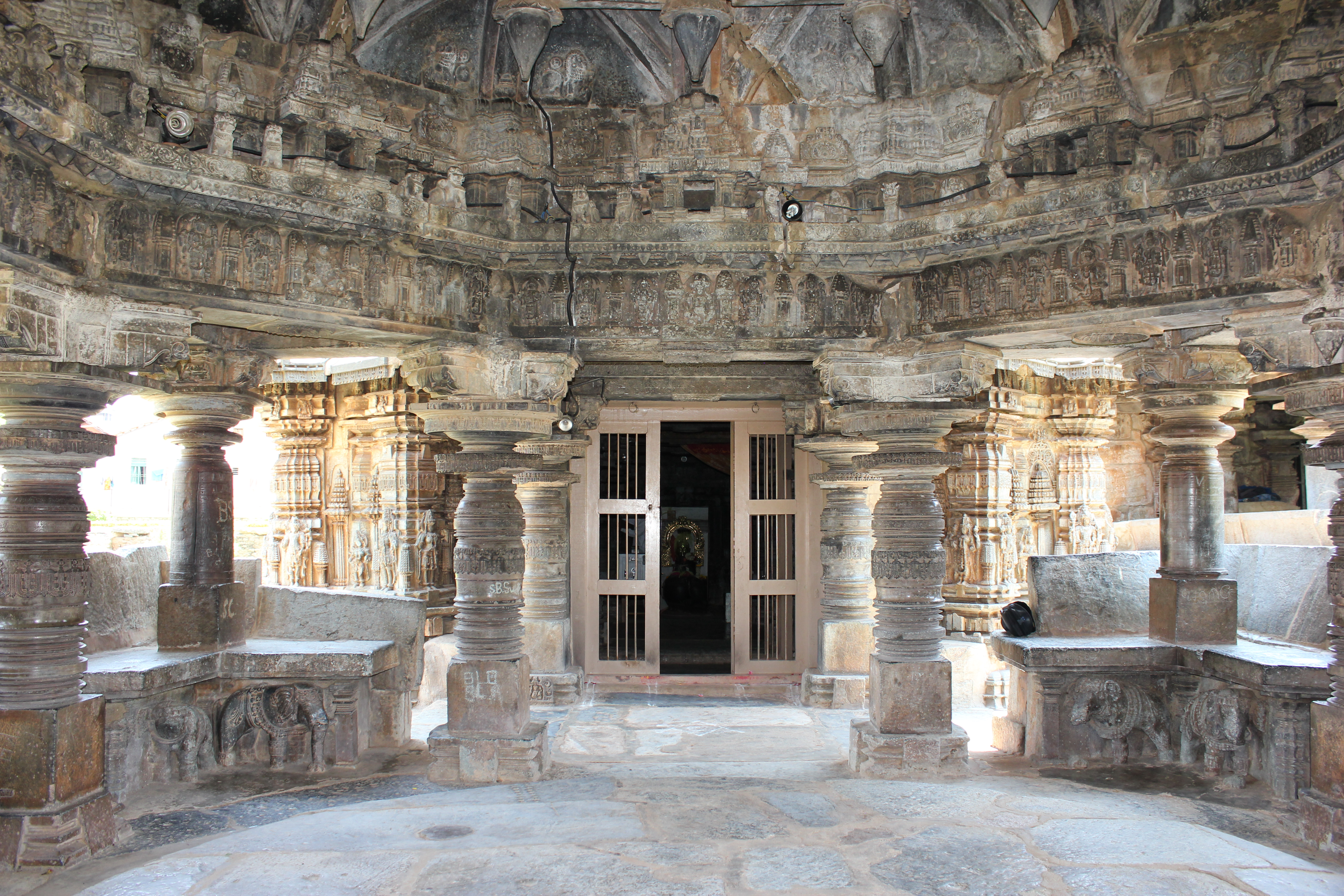
Stellate Navaranga mantapa with domical ceiling in Ishvara temple at Arasikere

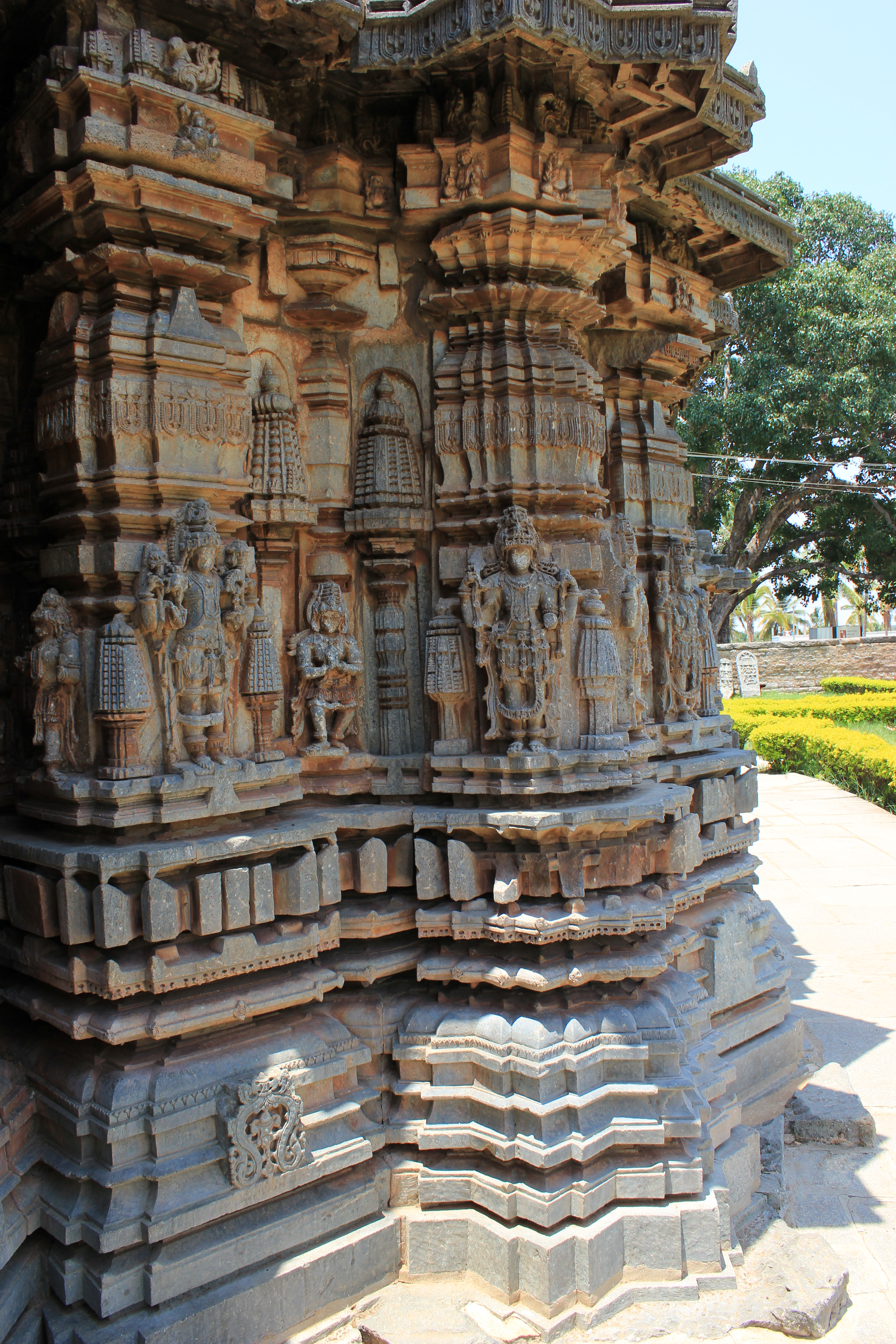
Relief articulation on outer wall of shrine in Ishvara temple at Arasikere

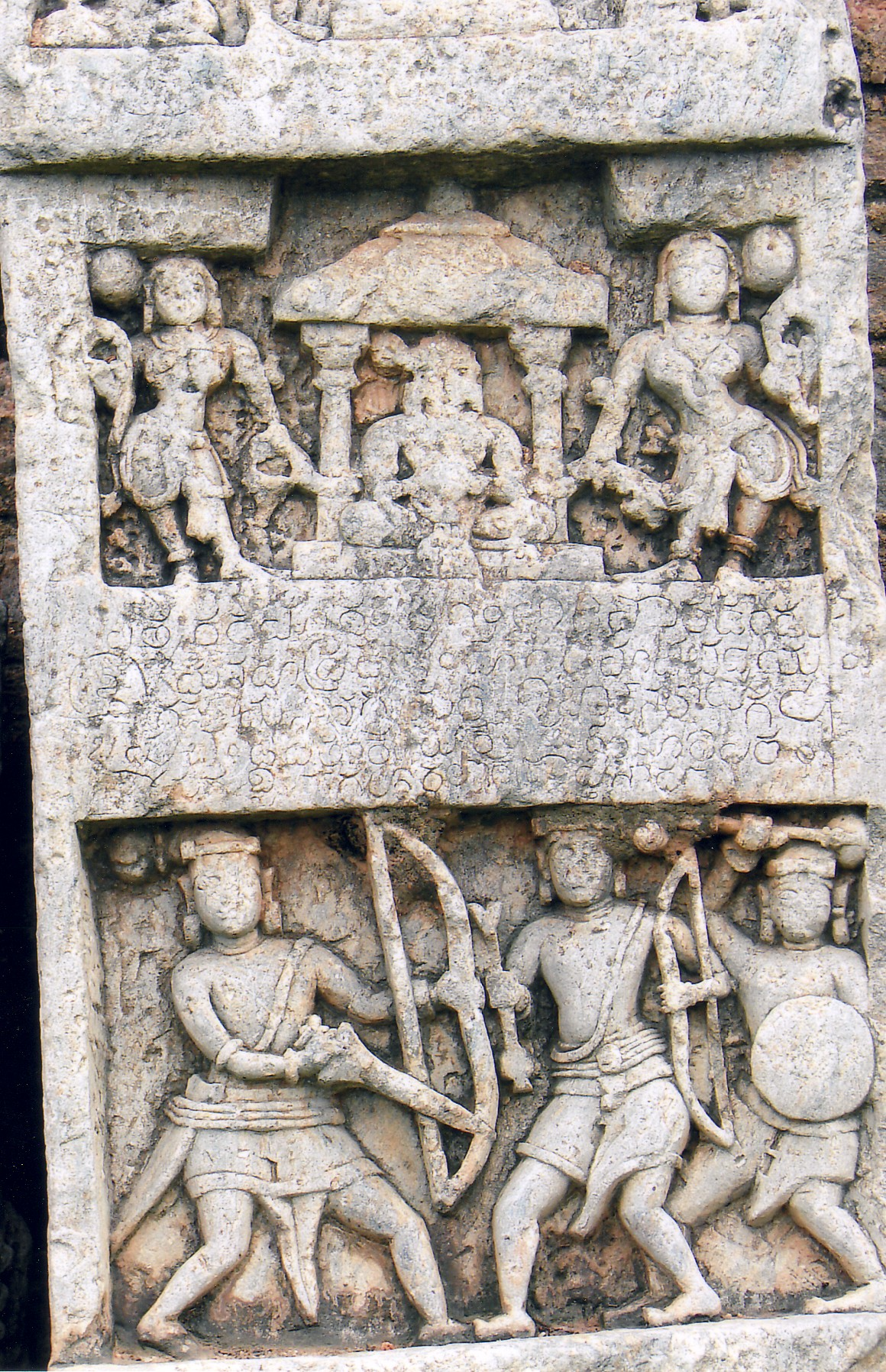
13th century hero stone with old-Kannada inscription at Ishvara temple

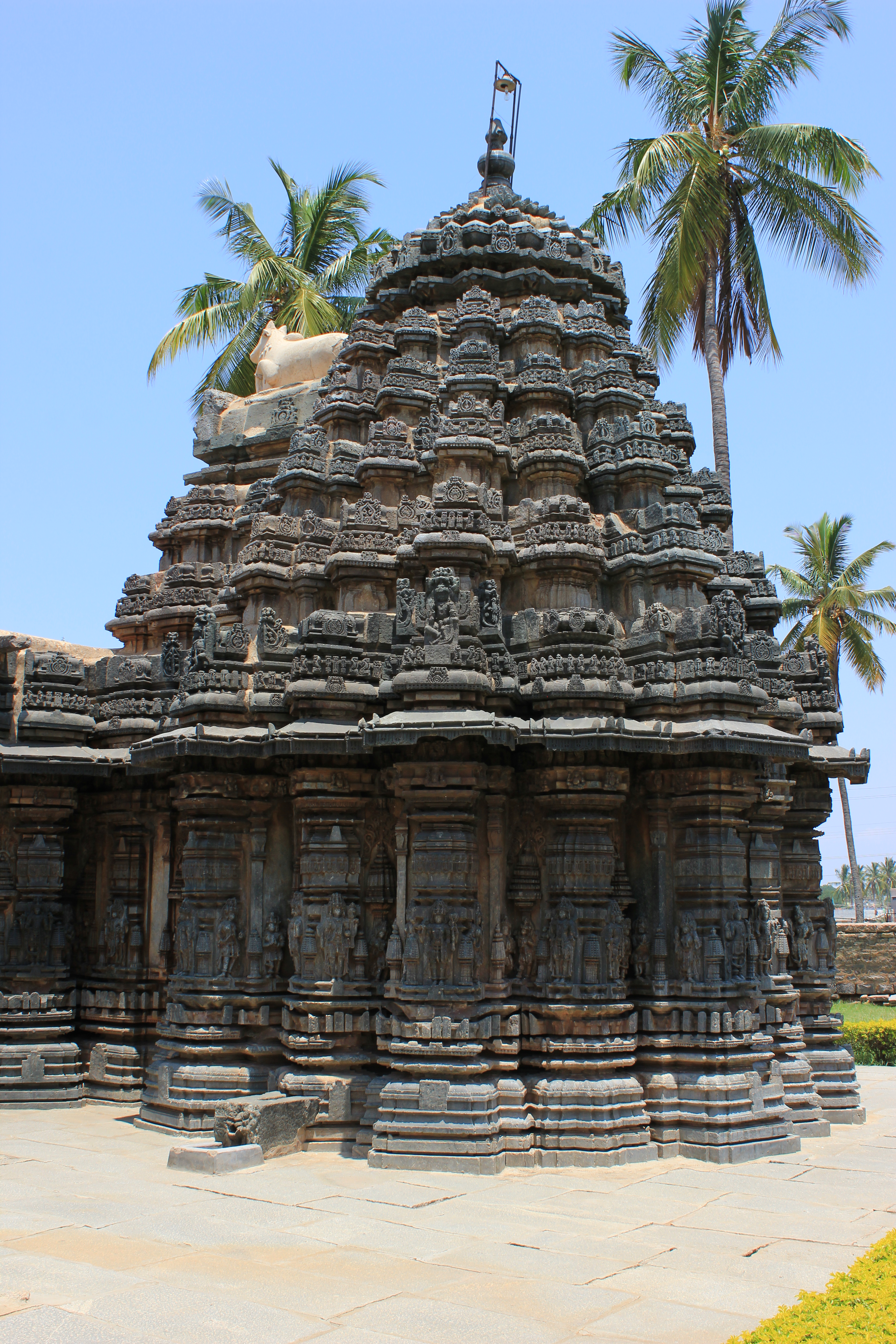
Star-shaped shrine with wall panel images and shikhara (superstructure)

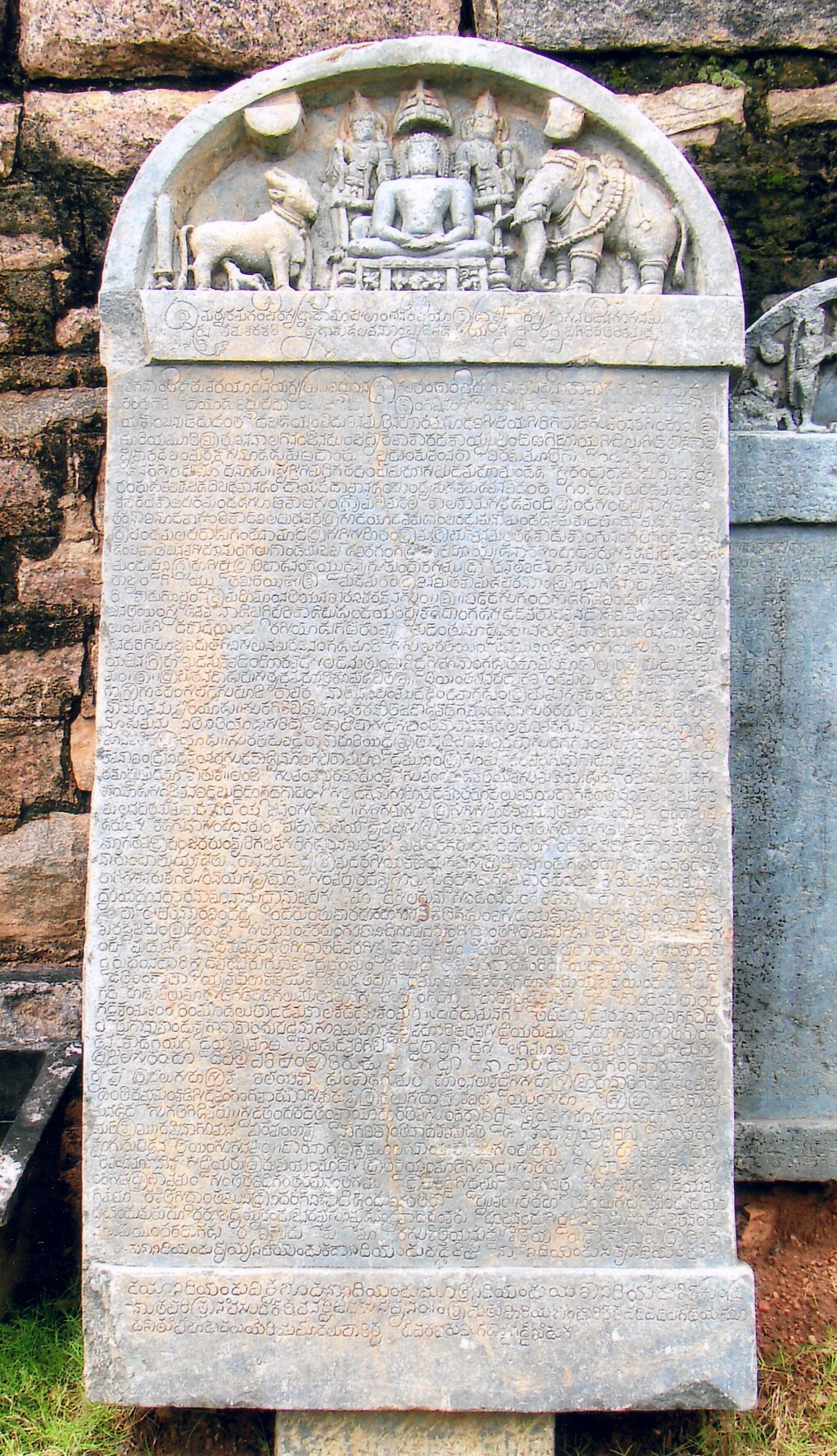
Old Kannada inscription (c. 1220 CE) in Ishvara temple at Arasikere

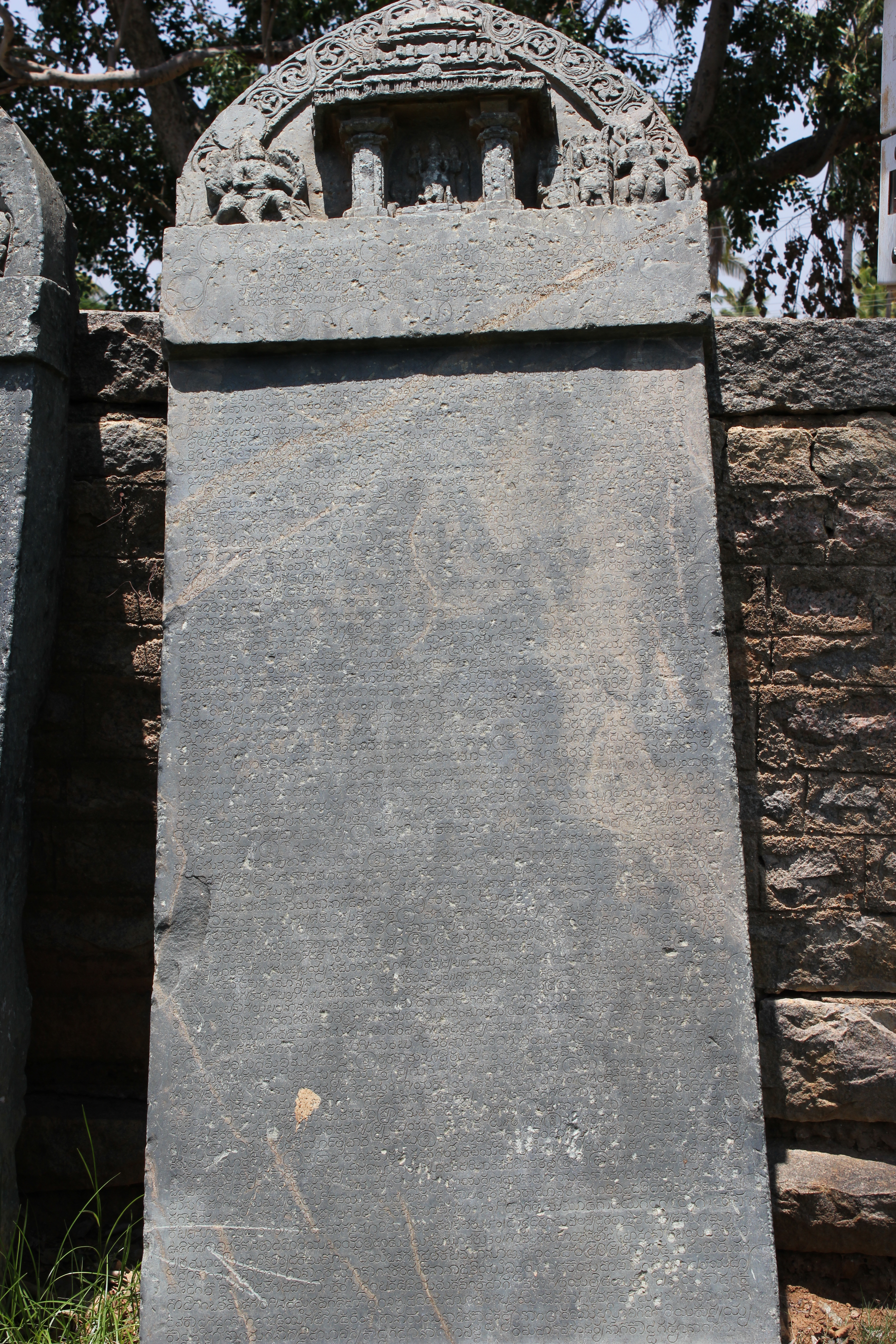
Old Kannada inscription of c. 1220 CE in Ishvara temple at Arasikere
