= Ruvari Malithamma =

12th-century architect and sculptor

Ruvari Malithamma was a famous 'Viswakarma' architect and sculptor in the 12th century who made many important contributions to temples built by the Hoysala Empire in Karnataka state, India. His contributions greatly enriched the idiom called Hoysala architecture. From inscriptions and signatures left behind by him on the master pieces he created, it is known that he built the Kesava temple at Somanathapura and worked on forty other monuments, including the Amruteshwara temple at Amruthapura in Chikkamagaluru district. Ruvari Malithamma specialised in ornamentation, and his works spanned six decades. His sculptures were usually signed in shorthand as Malli or simply Ma.
