= Jain temples, Halebidu =

Jain temples in the state of Karnataka

Jain Basadis of hoysala
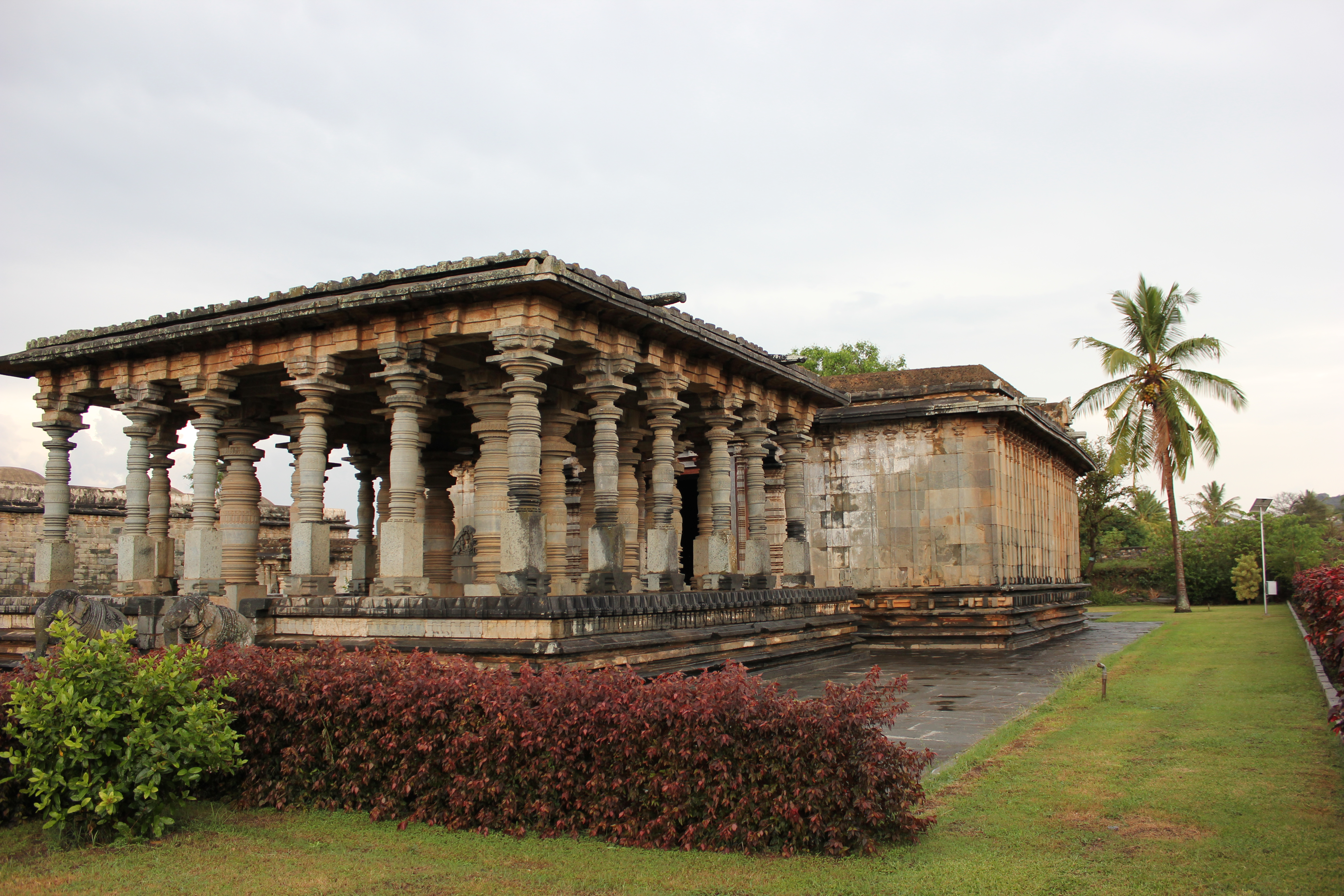
- Parshvanatha Basadi

Religion
- Affiliation: Jainism
- Deity: Parshvanatha, Shantinatha and Adinatha
- Festival: Mahavir Jayanti

Location
- Location: Hassan, Karnataka, India
- Interactive map of Jain Basadis of hoysala
- Coordinates: 13°12′31.2″N 75°59′42.4″E

Architecture
- Style: Hoysala architecture
- Creator: Vishnuvardhana, Veera Ballala II
- Established: 12th century
- Temple: 3

Jain hoysala complex in Halebidu, Hassan district consists of three Jain Basadis (Basti or temples) dedicated to the Jain Tirthankars Parshvanatha, Shantinatha and Adinatha. The complex is situated near Kedareshwara temple and Dwarasamudra lake. The temple complex also includes a step well called Hulikere Kalyani.

These temples were constructed in the 12th century during the reign of Hoysala Empire along with Kedareshwara temple and Hoysaleswara Temple.Archaeological Survey of India has listed all three basadi in the complex in the list of "Must See" Indian Heritage and are also inscribed as one of the "Adarsh Smarak Monument".

== History ==
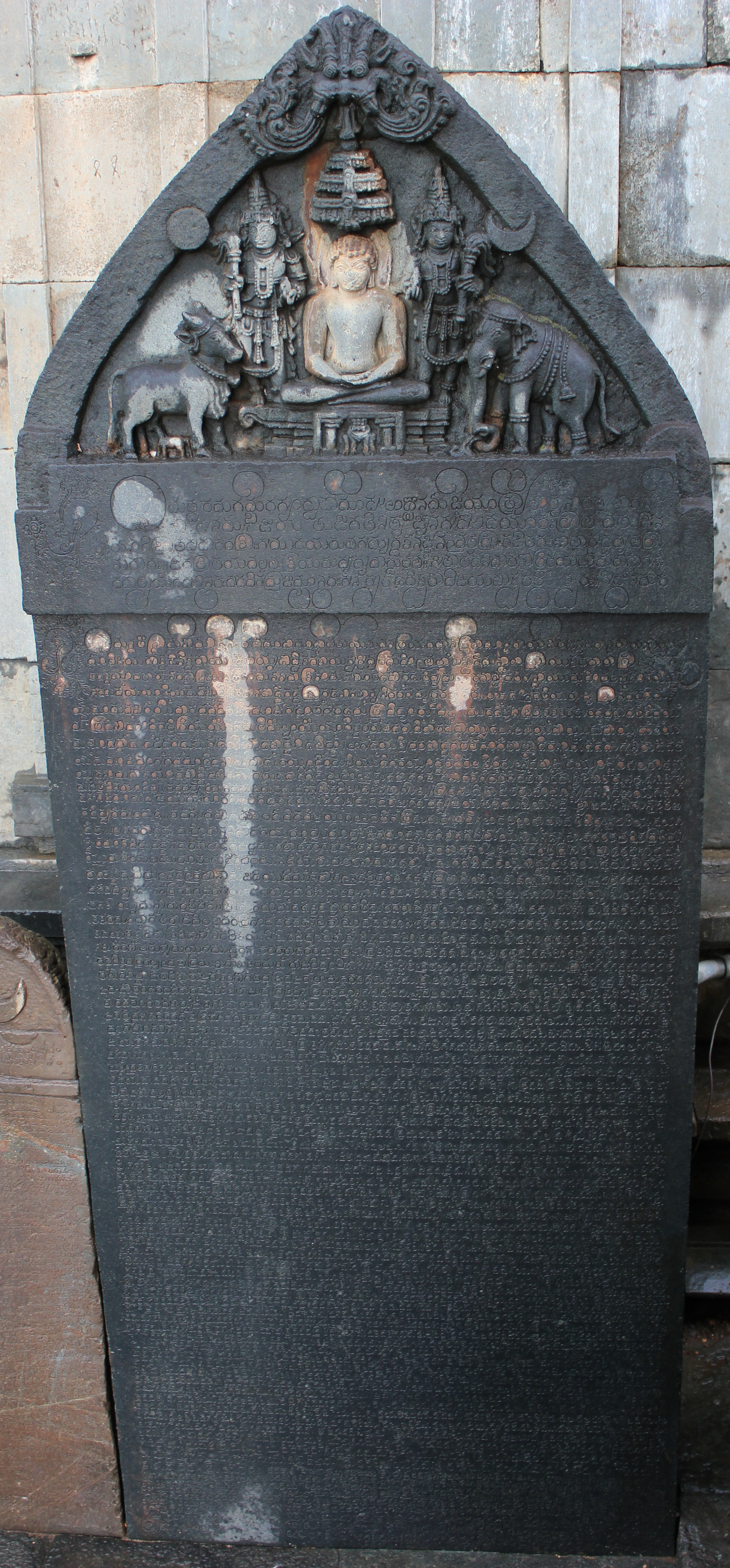
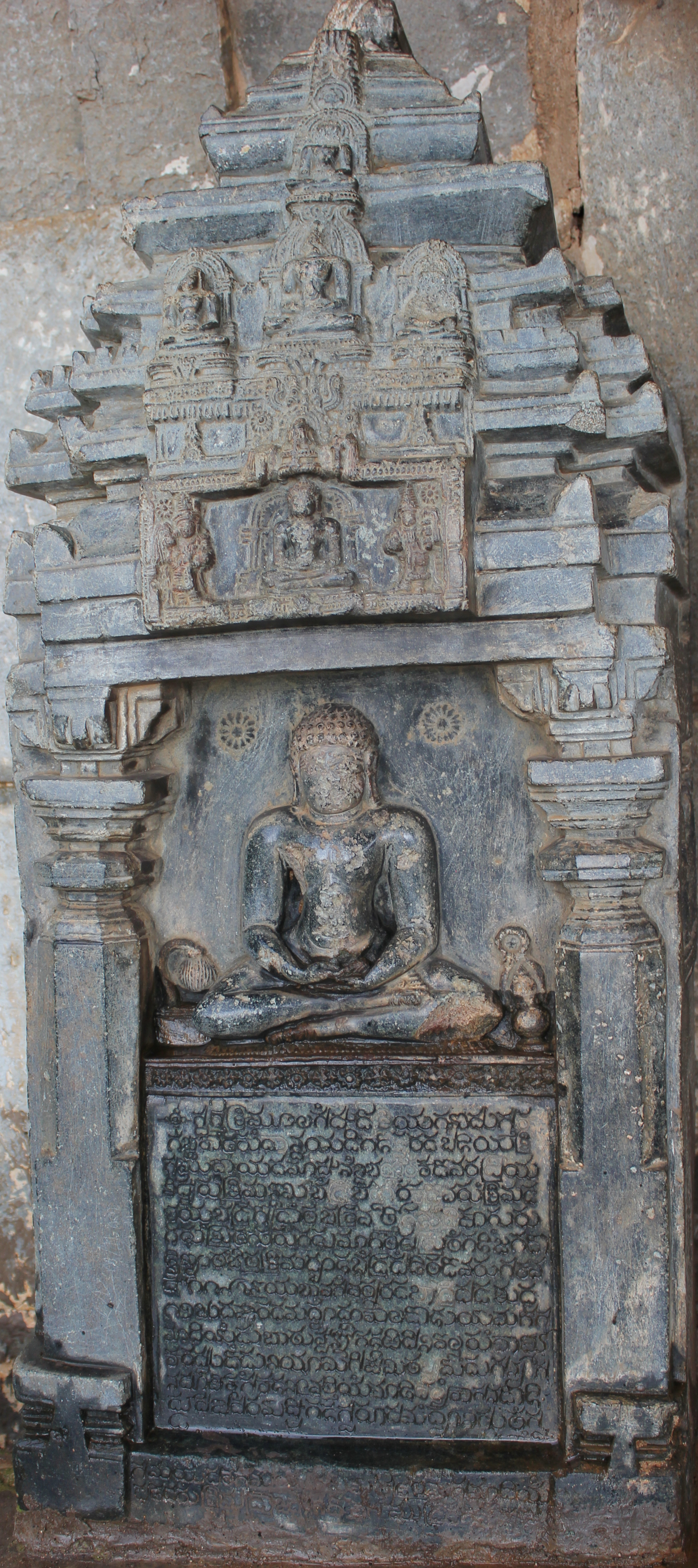
Inscription inside Parshvanatha basadi (left) and Adinatha basadi (right)

Halebidu was the capital of the Hoysala Empire between the c. 11th to 14th century CE when Jainism maintained a strong presence in the region. The region was called Dorasamudra or Dwarasamundra during the rule of Hoysala. Bittiga (later became Vishnuvardhana), is considered the greatest ruler of Hoysala kingdom and was a Jain till around 1115 after which he converted to Vaishnavism under the influence of the Hindu saint Ramanujacharya. However, he still recognized Jainism on par with Hinduism. During their regime, Hinduism and Jainism co-existed with utmost religious harmony. Vishnuvardhana's wife Shantala Devi, remained a follower of Jainism. These temple were later maintained by Maharaja of Mysore. There are three basadis in this complex:

The Parshvanatha Basadi was built by Boppadeva in 1133 CE during the reign of King Vishnuvardhana. Boppadeva was the son of the notable Gangaraja, a minister under Hoysala King Vishnuvardhana. The construction of the temple coincided with the victory of Narasimha I as the royal heir to the throne. The deity therefore is called Vijaya Parsvanatha (lit, "victorious Parsvanatha").

The Shantinatha Basadi was built around 1192 CE, during the reign of Veera Ballala II.

The Adinatha Basadi is the smallest of the Jain basadis also built in c. 12th century. A monolith of Bahubali which was present inside this temple but is now displayed outside Halebidu museum.

The surviving Jain basadis were not constructed as a single building project, but were erected at different times and under separate patrons. The concentration of Jain and Hindu monuments at the Hoysala capital reflects the presence of multiple religious establishments at Dvarasamudra during the Hoysala period.

The temples along with the capital were plundered and destroyed twice, by Malik Kafur, general of Alauddin Khalji during the Siege of Dwarasamudra in 1311 and by Sultan Muhammad bin Tughluq in 1326. The Wodeyar of Mysore and Ummathur (1399–1610), Nayakas of Keladi (1550–1763) were hostile Jains. In 1683, they stamped linga symbol in the main basati of Jains in Halebid and Jains were forced to perform Shiva rites.

== Architecture ==
While Hoysaleswara temple and Kedareshwara temple are famous workmanship, The Jain basadis are famous for architectural tradition. Halebidu Jain complex along with Pattadakal are the most famous Jain centers in South Karnataka. The temples are great example on dravidian architecture. All three surviving temples are ekakuta, or single-shrine, structures. Their west-to-east sequence consists of the Parshvanatha, Adinatha and Shantinatha basadis respectively.

Parshvanatha Basadi

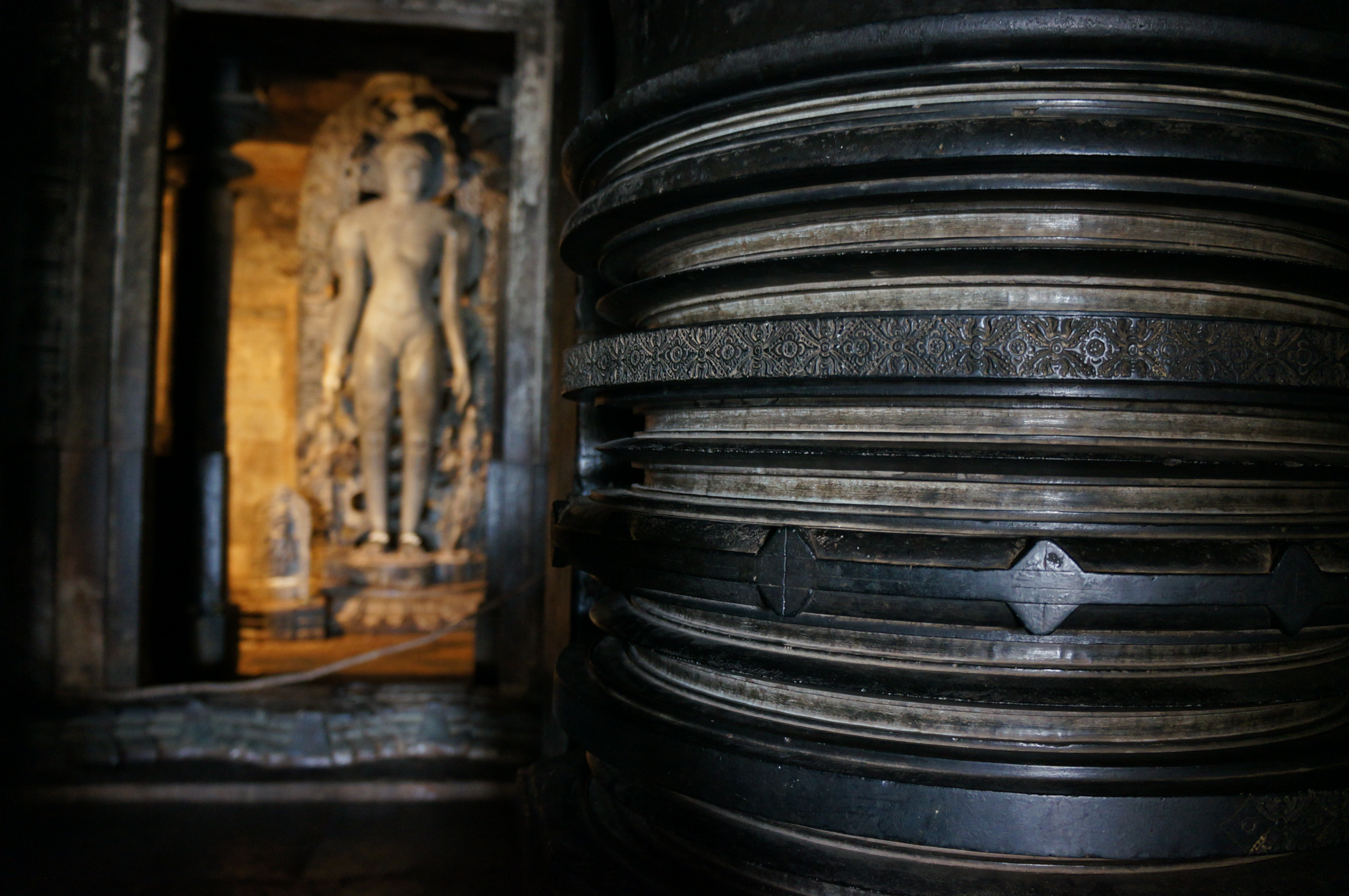
Exquisite carvings of lathe-turned Pillar in Parsvanatha Basadi

Parshvanatha Basadi is notable for its architecture. This temple is famous for the beautiful navaranga halls and exquisite carvings on the lathe-turned pillars. These pillars are massive placed to each other, which according to Kurt Bruhn signifies "the many layers karma that way us down with their black colour representing timelessness like it is for tirthankars". The ceiling of the mandapa and mahamandapa is ornate with the sculpture of yaksha Dharanendra at the centre. Indologist Klaus Fisher describes the intricate artwork that embellishes the temple's ceiling as the most elaborate in all of Halebidu. Architecturally, the temple follows an ekakuta plan. The garbhagriha has a linear arrangement articulated by three principal projections.

The temple has a Ardhamandapa ("half hall") and a Mahamandapa ("great hall") with a monolithic 18 feet (5.5 m) idol of Parshvanatha in Kayotsarga posture. Sculptures of yaksha Dharanendra and yakshi Padmavati are present in the mahamandapa. This temple is the largest and considered the most architecturally significant in the basadi complex. Along with being rich in sculptures, the temple also features carvings of the life-scenes of Tirthankaras on the ceiling panel of mukhamandapa. There is a famous image of Padmavati with three hooded cobra over her head and with fruits in three hands and a weapon in fourth. The temple also features niches for idols of the 24 tirthankaras.

Shantinatha Basadi

Shantinatha Basadi or Santisvara basadi consist of a garbhagriha ("sanctum"), ardhamandapa, mahamandapa, large granite pillars with the inner sanctum consisting of a block stone 18 feet (5.5 m) image of Shantinatha, the sixteenth tirthankar. The merloned structure is supported by a square pillared porch with granite pillars. The adhisthana moldings are similar to Parsvanatha Basti. A series of lathe-turned pillars supports the ceiling. The previous Mahamastakabhisheka was organized in January 2010. The temple complex also includes a Brahmadeva pillar erected outside the temple.

Adinatha Basadi

Adinatha Basadi is a small non-ornate temple consisting of garbhagriha, mandapa ("hall") with the image of the Adinatha and beautifully carved the Hindu goddess Saraswati. The original idol of Adinatha was a stout figure in lotus position; However, kept in navaranga hall after it broke. There is a statue of Jina equal in the height to the other two basadi. The sanctum is bereft of superstructure. The original image of Adinatha was damaged and was subsequently placed in the navaranga.

The basadi complex also includes a monolithic 18 feet tall manasthamba and Hulikere Kalyani (reservoir).

== Excavation ==
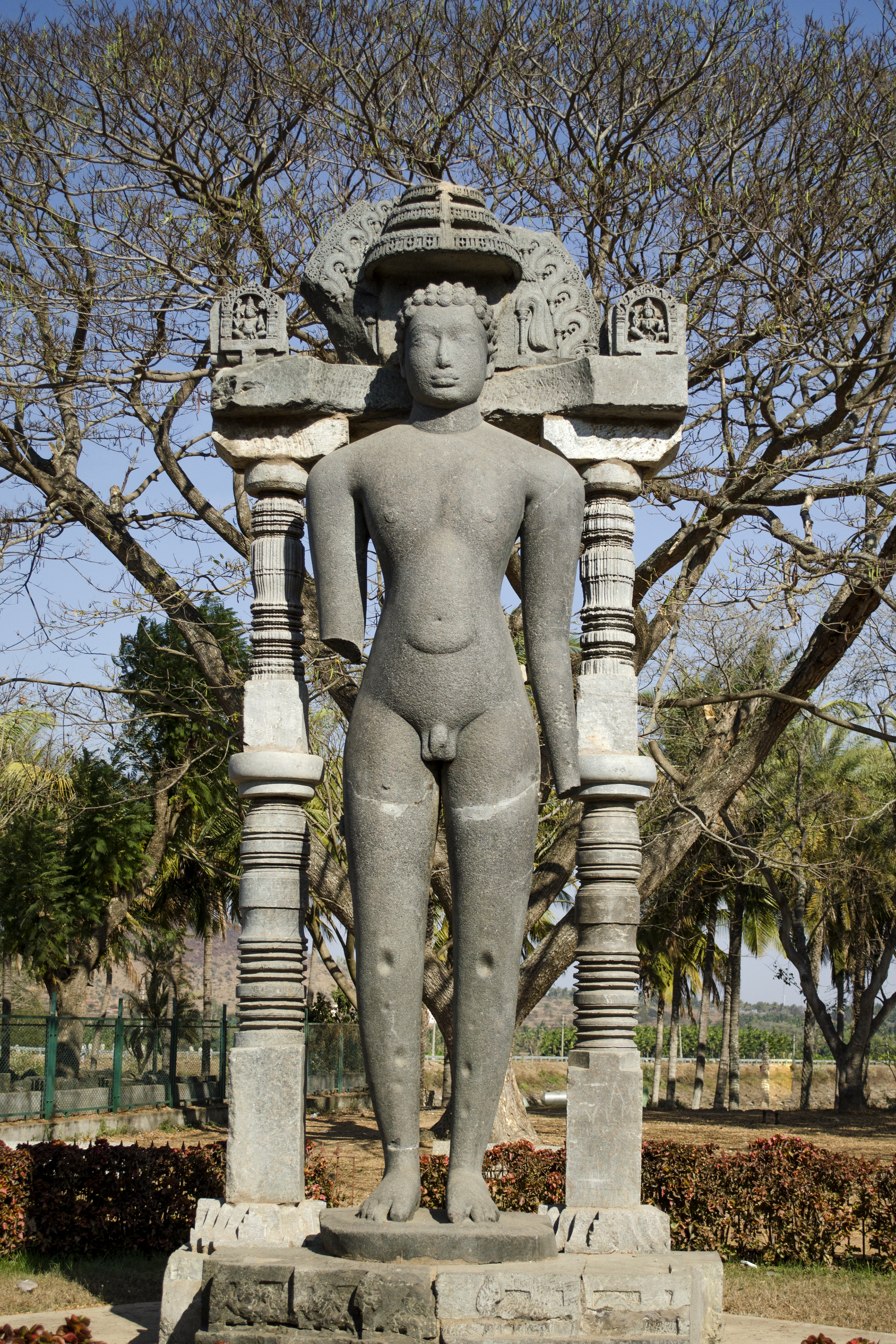
12th century, Bahubali statue, Halebid museum

In 2019, the remains of Jain temple were found near Parshvanatha Basadi. In the excavated structure around ten sculptures were found, these sculptures have been moved to Halebid museum. ASI started constructing a compound wall around the Jain complex but during construction few Jain sculptures were found along with the basement structure of another Jain temple. The sculptures were moved to the museum. However, the temple structure was damaged due to the use of heavy earthmoving machinery. The remains of a 30 m × 20 m (98 ft × 66 ft) Jain temple built in the time of Hoysala dynasty was discovered near the Shantinatha Basadi during an excavation in 2021. Many artefacts and sculptures were discovered in the temple site. A 2 feet (0.61 m) Jain Upasaka sculpture was also discovered along with the temple remains.

According to A. Aravazhi, assistant archeologist in Archaeological Survey of India, Halebidu has many Jain temples built during the reign of Hoysala empire underground.

== Restoration ==
These Jain basadi complex is protected by Archaeological Survey of India. A compound wall is being built around the temple structure found 2019, more than 1,000 sculptures have been found in this area, ASI is planning to build an open-air museum for display. These idols include an idol of Goddess Ambika represented as salabhanjika with her child in one hand and amra-lumbi (mango tree branch) in other. Department of tourism has issued Rs. 30 crores to facelift Belur and Halebidu for improving religious tourism. The Jain temples other than Parshvanatha Basadi, Shantinatha Basadi and Adinatha Basadi in Haledbidu are in a lesser state of preservation.

The Jain Basadi complex is located within the buffer zone of the Halebidu component of the Sacred Ensembles of the Hoysalas, which was inscribed on the UNESCO World Heritage List in 2023.

Halebidu is also on the route followed by luxury tourist train - Golden Chariot.

== Gallery ==
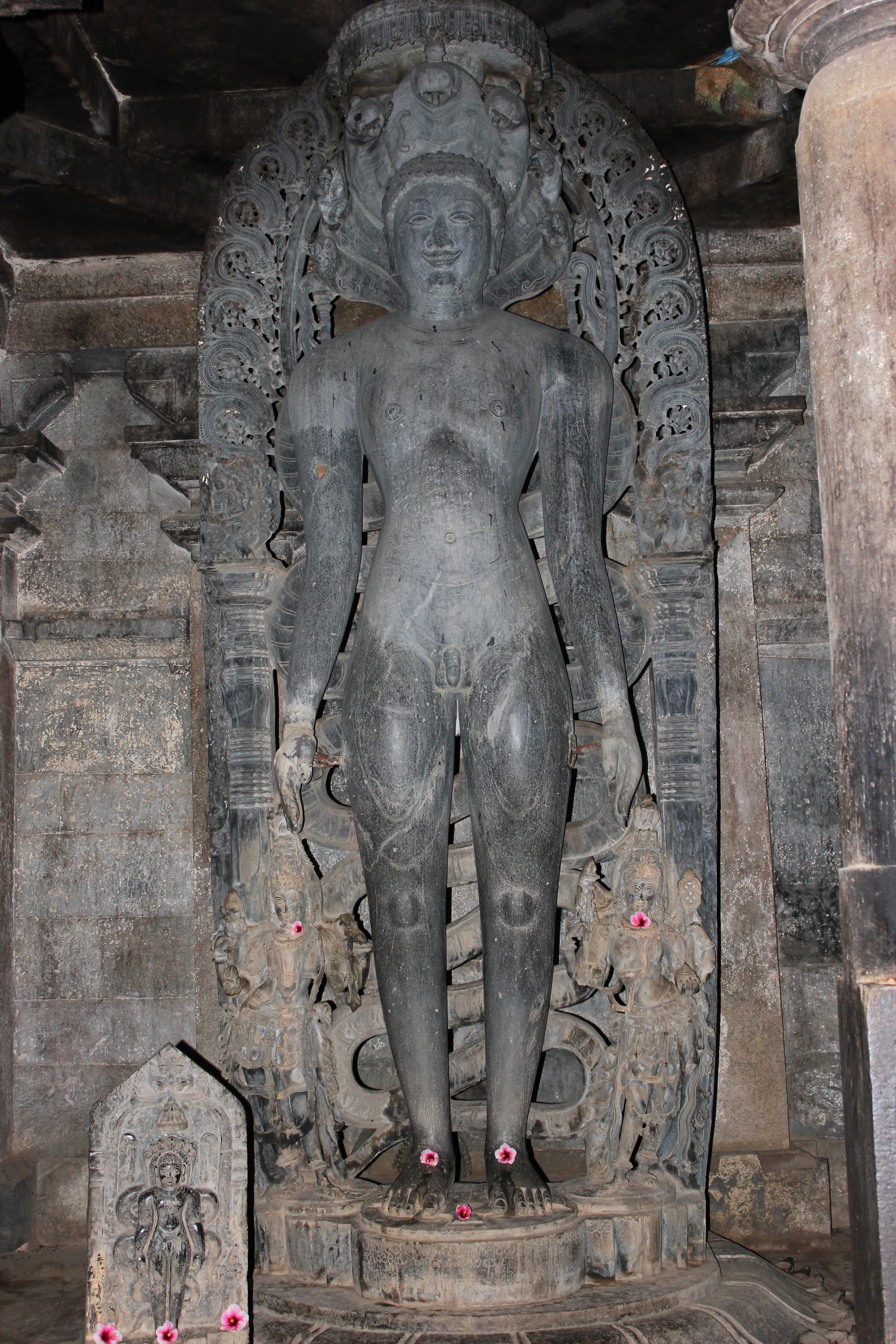
18 feet (5.5 m) sculpture of Parshvanatha, Parshvanatha basadi

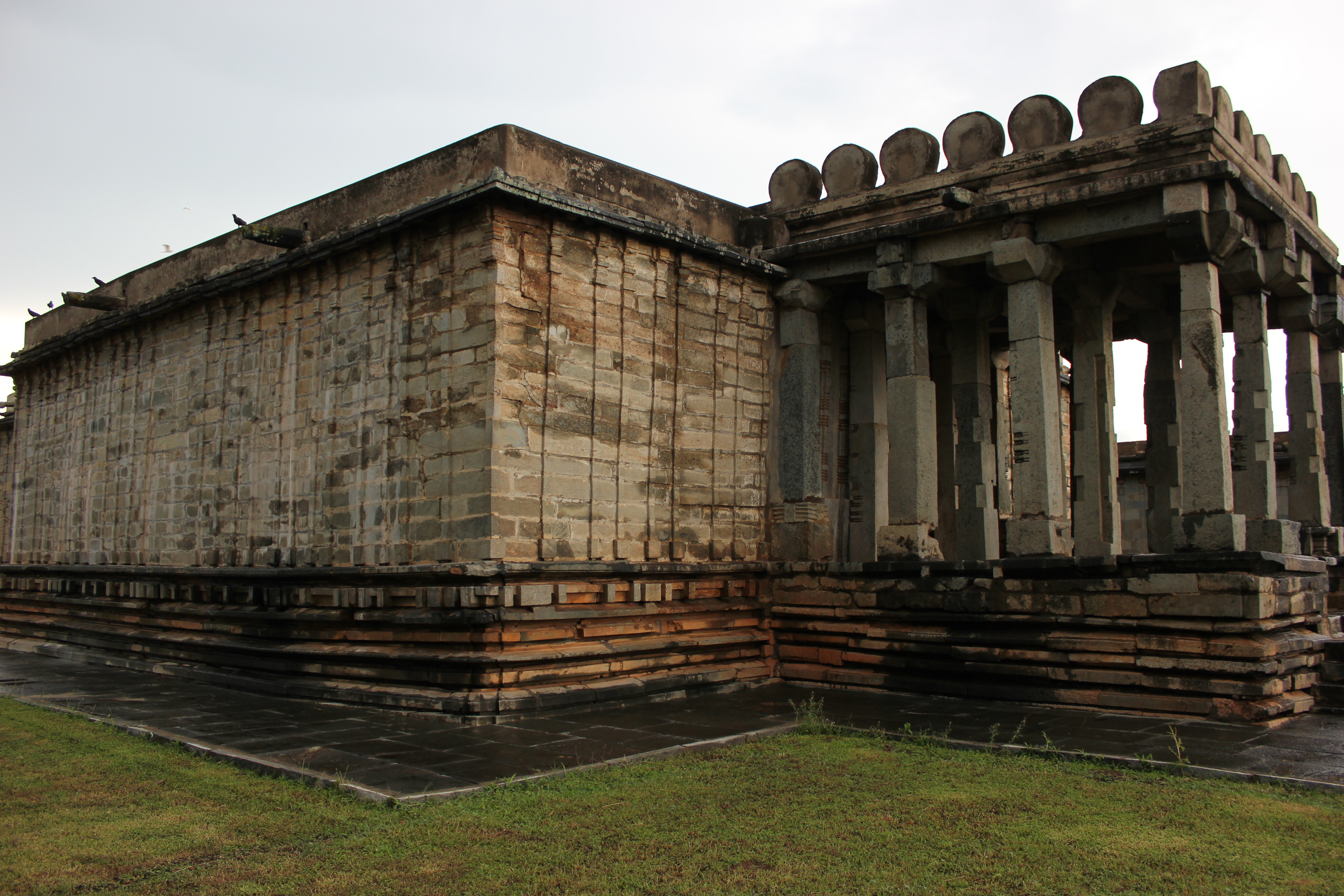
Shantinatha basadi

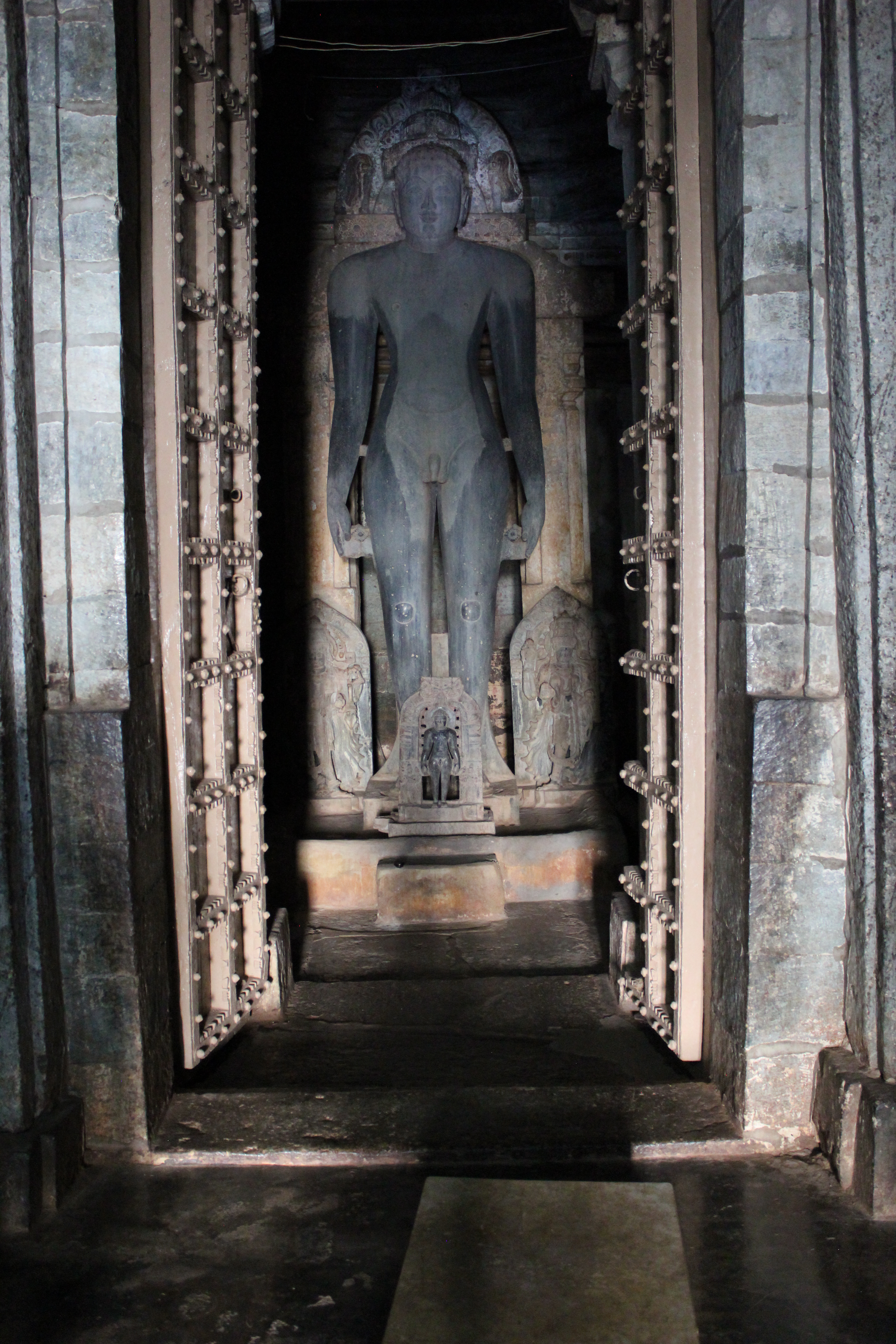
18 feet (5.5 m) sculpture of Shantinatha, Shantinatha basadi

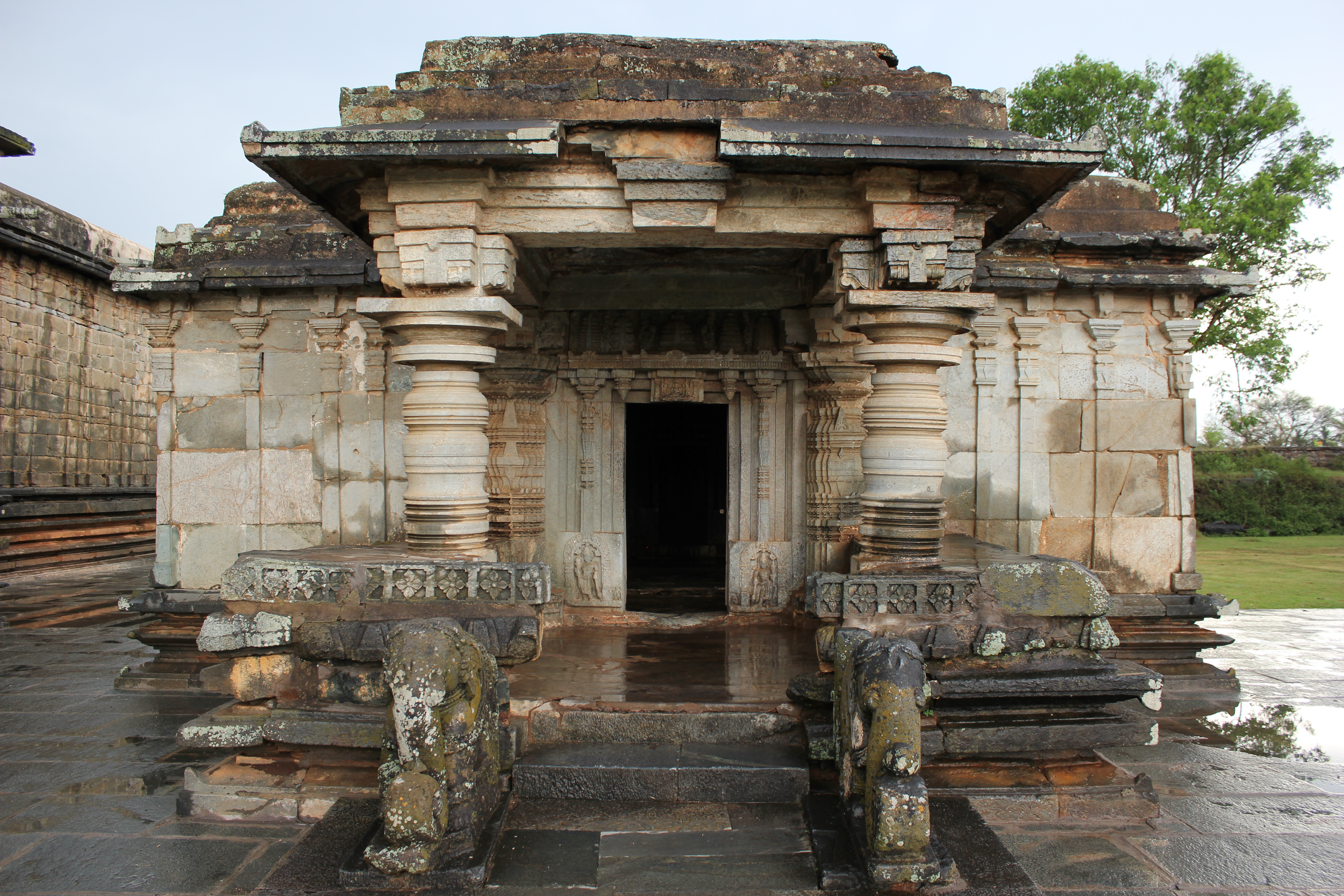
Adinatha basadi

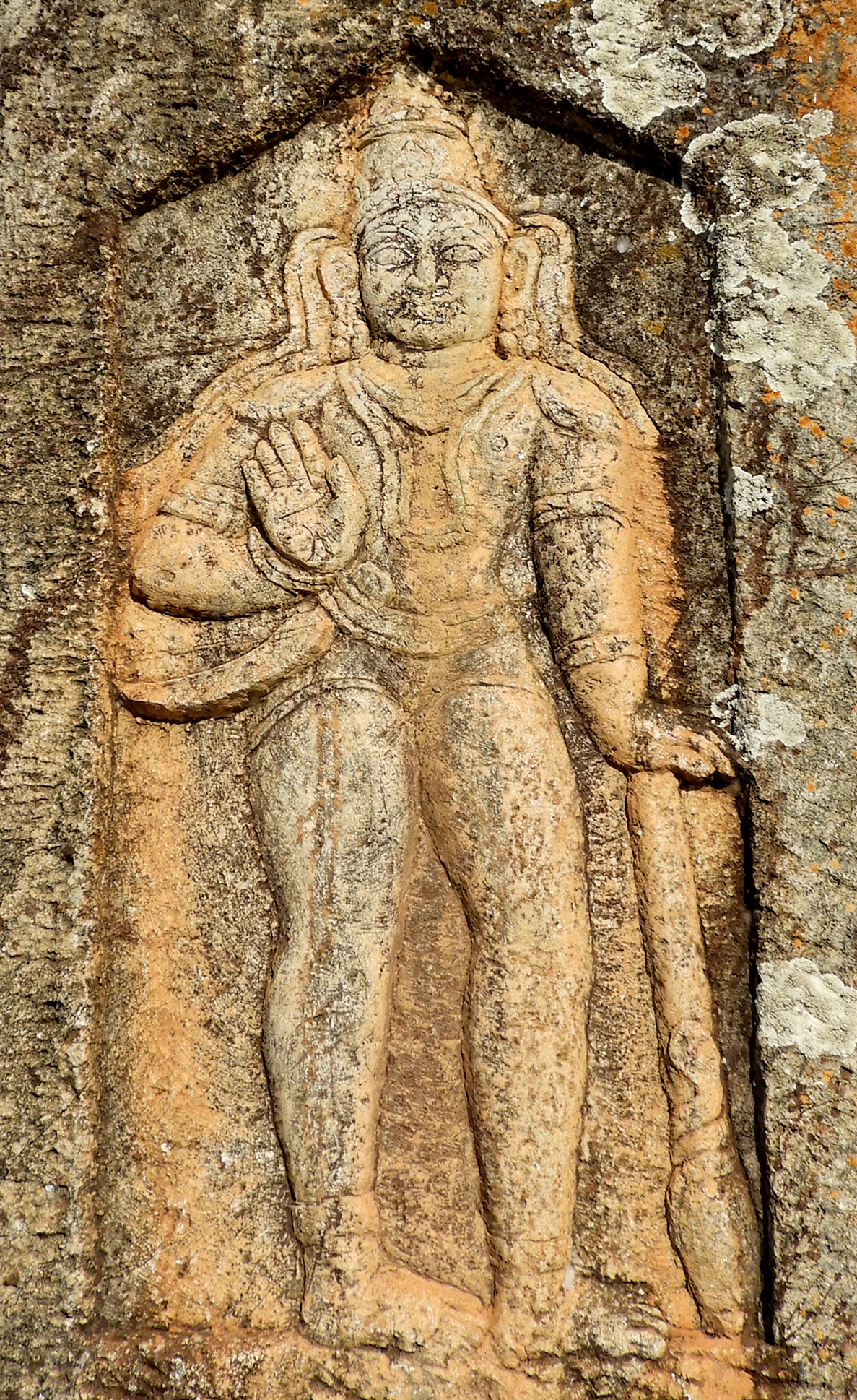
Relief on manastambha outside Parshvanatha Basadi

== See also ==
- Hoysala architecture
- Hoysaleswara Temple
- Jainism in Karnataka
- List of World Heritage Sites in India
- Shravanabelagola

== Enternal links ==
- Sacred Ensembles of the Hoysala
