= Veera Ballala II =

Hoysala King from 1173 to 1220

- Chakravarti

Hoysala emperor
- Reign: 22 July 1173 – 1220
- Predecessor: Narasimha I
- Successor: Vira Narasimha II
- Spouse: Cholamahadevi, Ketaladevi
- Issue: Vira Narasimha II, Somaladevi
- Dynasty: Hoysala

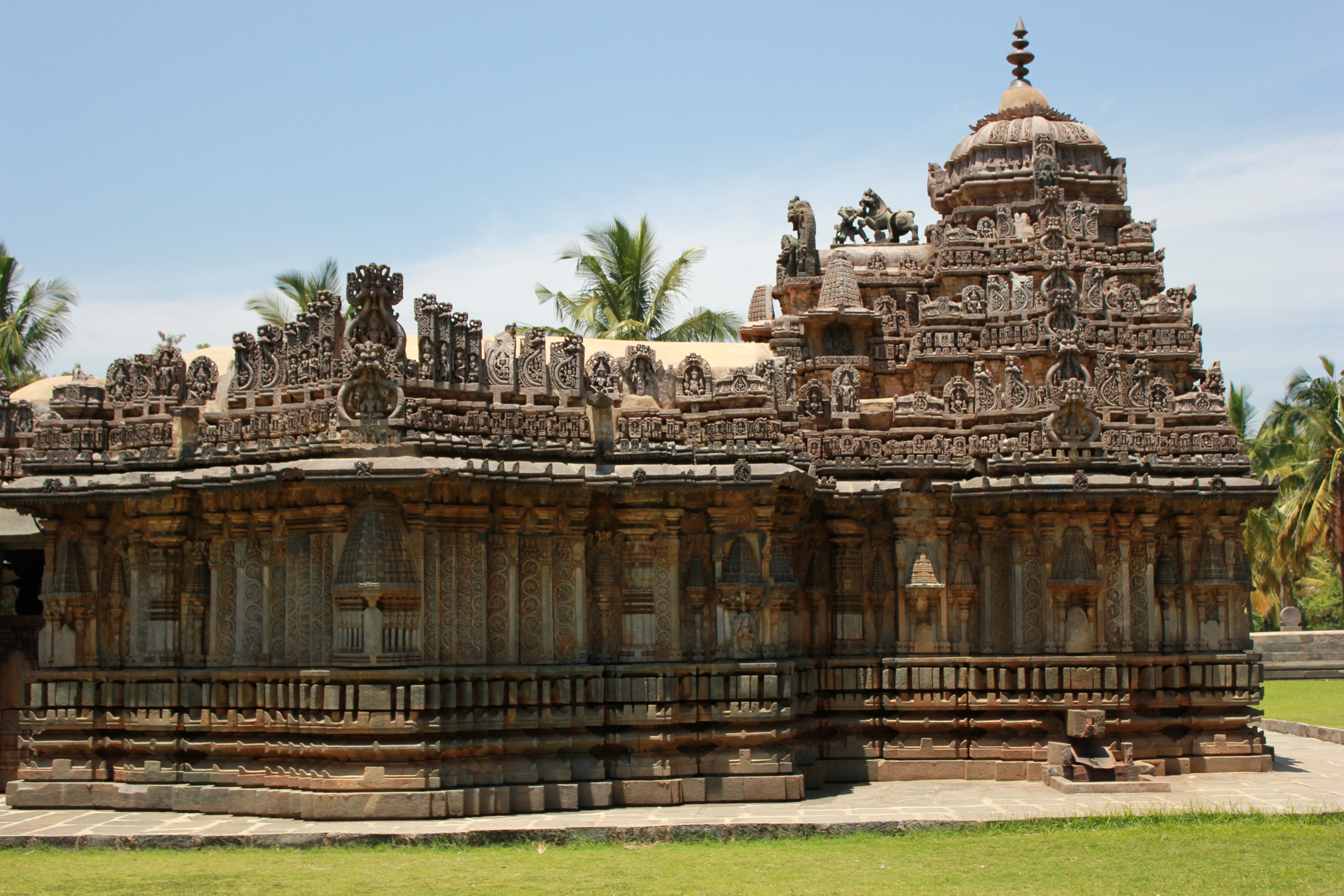
Amrutheshwara Temple at Amruthapura, c. 1196

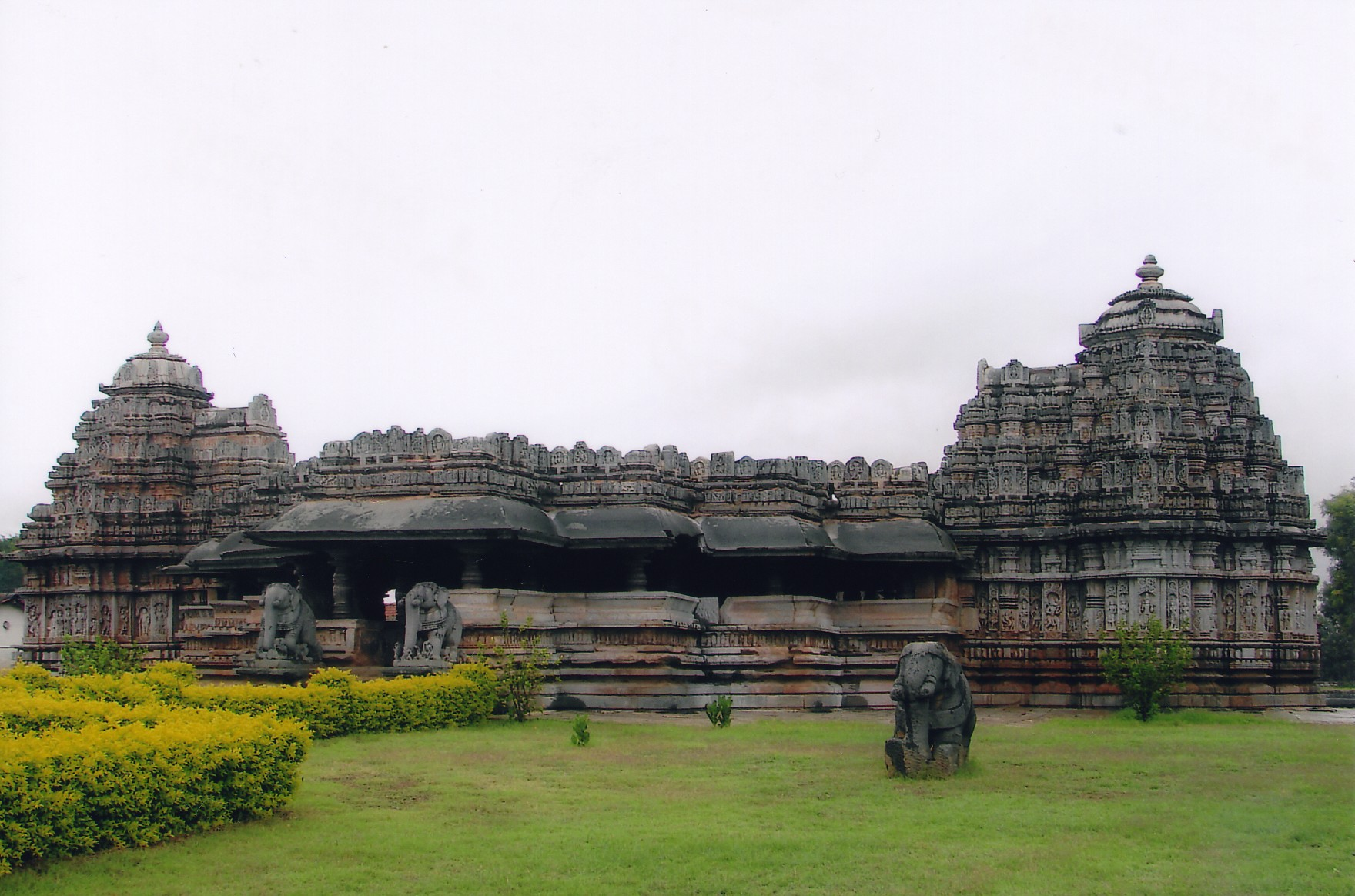
Veeranarayana Temple in Belavadi, c. 1200

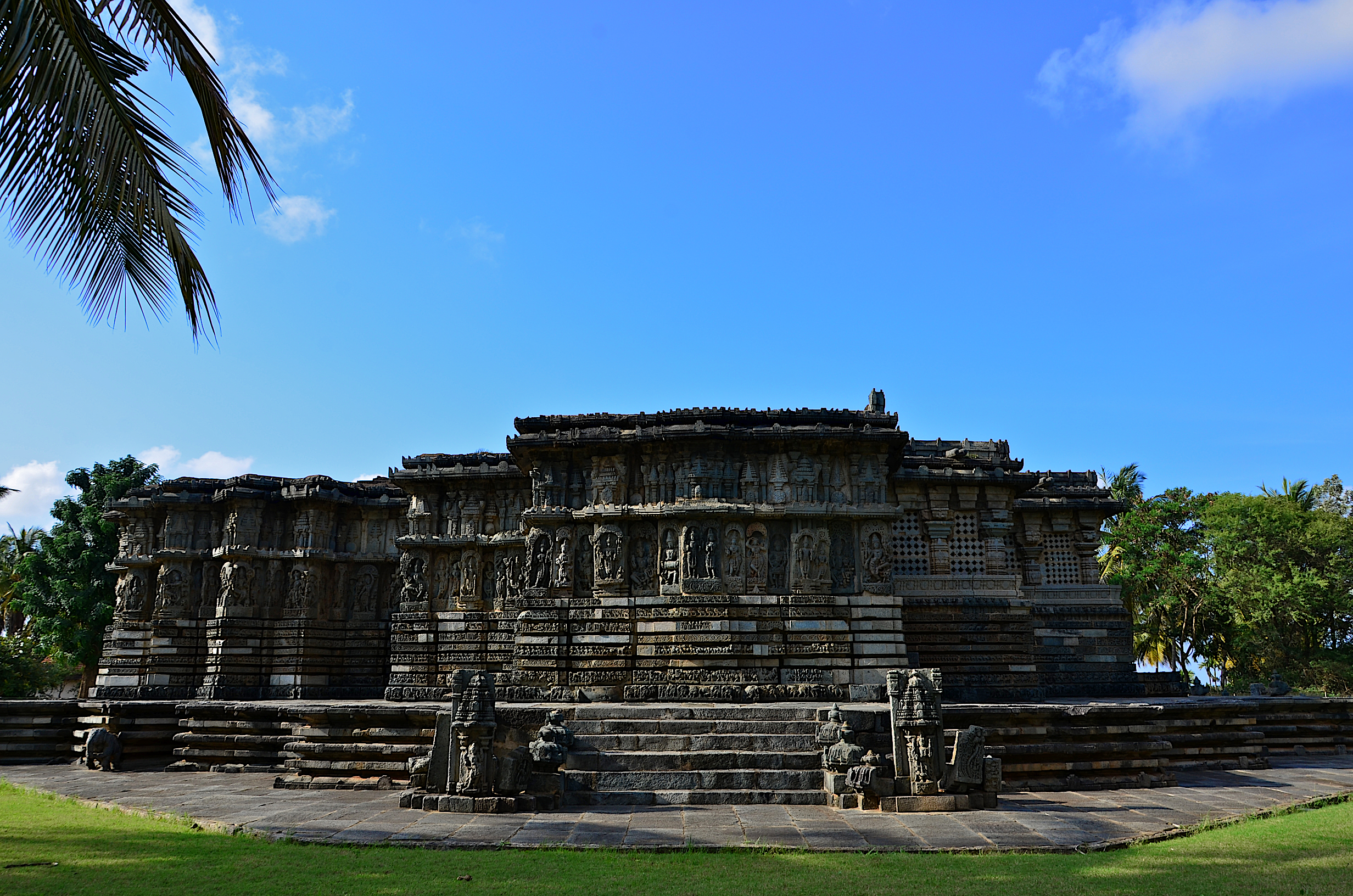
The Kedareshwara temple at Halebidu, c. 1200

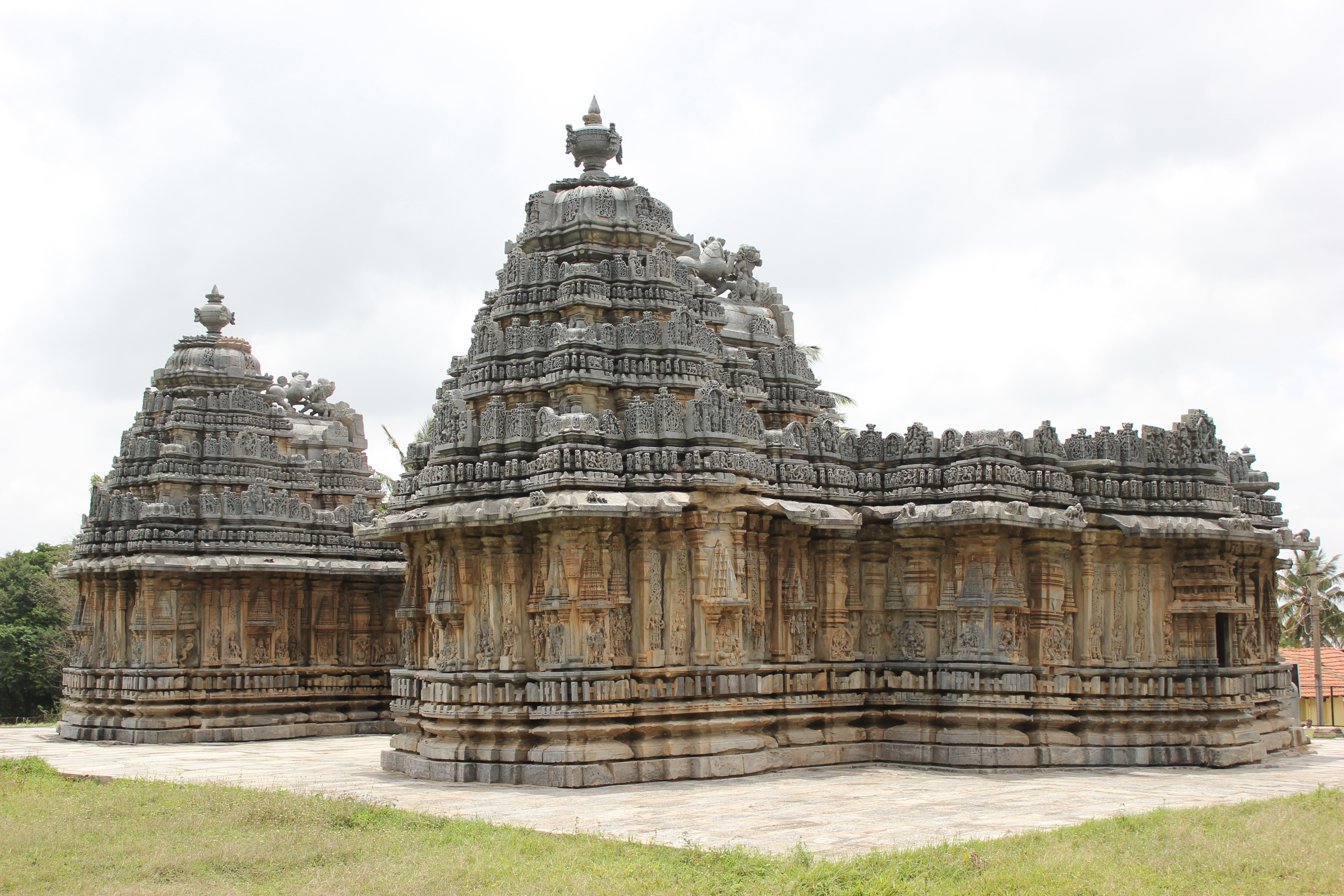
Nageshvara (near) and Chennakeshava (far) temples at Mosale, c. 1200

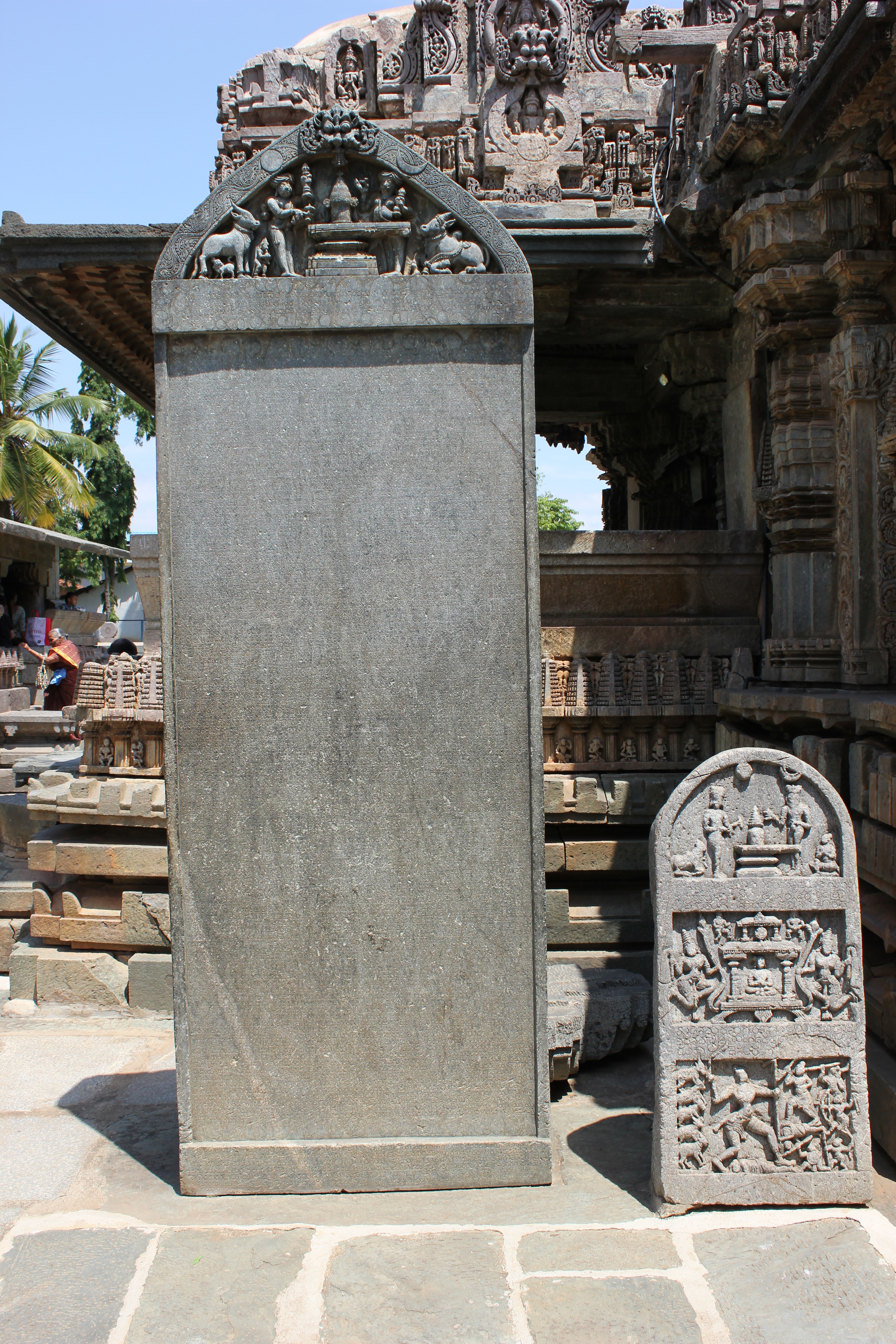
Old Kannada inscription (c. 1196 AD) from the rule of Veera Ballala II in the Amrutesvara temple at Amruthapura

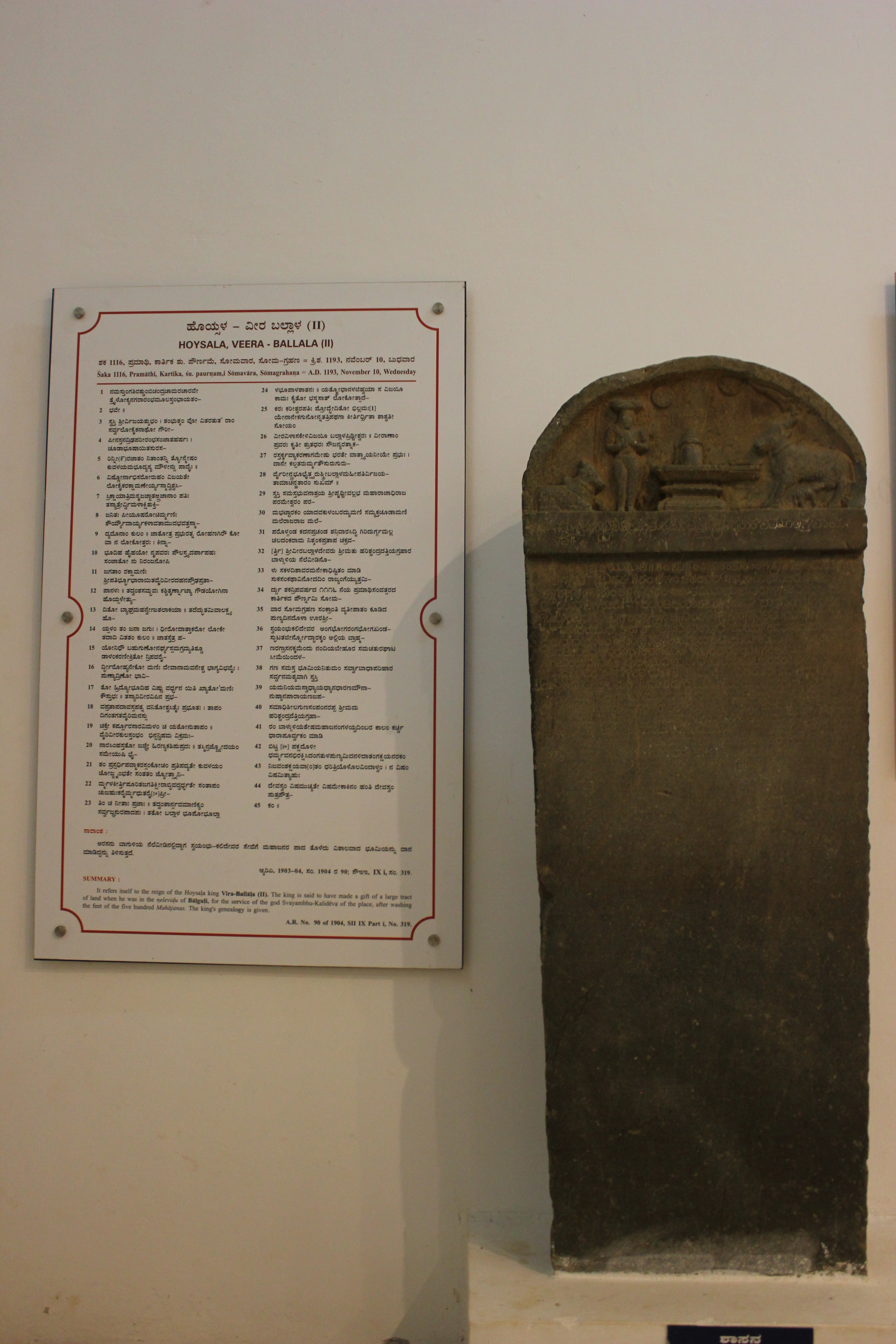
Old Kannada inscription (c. 1193 AD) of Hoysala empire King Veera Ballala II from Bagali, Karnataka

Veera Ballāla II (reigned 22 July 1173 – 1220) was the most notable king of the Hoysala Kingdom. His successes against the Yadavas of Devagiri, the Southern Kalachuris, the Pandyas of Madurai and the waning Western Chalukya Empire, and his domination over the diminishing Cholas of Tanjore took the Hoysalas to the peak of their power. The historian Chaurasia claims that by the end of the 12th century, Ballala II's conquests had made the Hoysalas the most powerful dynasty of Deccan. According to historian Derrett, Ballala II was "the most outstanding among Hoysala kings", and historian William Coelho in comparing Ballala II to King Vishnuvardhana writes, "he vied in glory with his grandfather".

His court was adorned with some of the most notable of medieval Kannada language poets including the Jain poets Janna and Nemichandra, and the Brahman poet Rudrabhatta. According to the historians Chopra et al., during his rule, the Hoysala kingdom consolidated into an independent empire commencing an age of "Hoysala imperialism". His architectural legacy includes numerous ornate temples, the Kedareshwara temple, the Veera Narayana temple and the Amrutesvara temple. He was ably supported in war and in administrative matters by his son, prince Vira Narasimha II, and crowned queen Umadevi. His other queen Cholamahadevi was a Chola princess. His daughter Somaladevi was given in marriage to the Chola monarch Kulothunga Chola III.

== Wars against the neighbouring kingdoms ==
Ballala II's ascendancy to the Hoysala throne on 22 July 1173 was preceded by his successful rebellion against his weak father Narasimha I with the help of some malnad chiefs, such as the Chengalvas and the Kongalvas. He later ensured the same chiefs' could not rise against him. In the late 12th century, the weakening Chalukya throne became the bone of contention between the main vassals, the Yadavas, the Hoysalas and the Kalachuris. Around c. 1168, the Kalachuri King Bijjala II had gained control of the Chalukyan capital Basavakalyan (then called Kalyani, in modern Bidar district of Karnataka state). According to historian Kamath, in c. 1171, an ambitious Ballala tasted first victory against Pandya king Kavadeva of the Uchchangi family. This was followed by the annexation of Hangal in c. 1178. But an attempt by him to invade Belvola-300 in c. 1179 led to his defeat by Kalachuri commander Sankama who seized Hangal. According to Chopra et al., in c. 1179, a Kalachuri invasion into the Hoysala territory resulted in a truce with Ballala II agreeing to accept nominal subordination and to help the Kalachuri in their designs against the Chalukyas. However, by c. 1183, the Kalachuris themselves were in serious decline due to the inept rule of the sons of Bijjala II. The last Chalukya scion, Someshvara IV, was back in control of his capital Basavakalyan with help from the Kalachuri commander Brahma.

The real contention now, for the territories in the Krishna-Tungabhadra doab region was between the Yadava King Bhillama V and the Hoysala monarch Ballala II. By c. 1189, Basavakalyana had fallen to Bhillama V who nevertheless failed to gain recognition from Chalukya vassals such as the Rattas, the Kadambas of Banavasi and the Shilahara. Taking advantage of this uncertainty, Ballala II led several expeditions to Banavasi against the exiled Chalukya King Someshvara VI and defeated him by c. 1190. In c. 1191, the Hoysala monarch gained the upper hand over Yadava Bhillama V in the critical battles of Soratur and Lakkundi (in the modern Gadag district) where he appears to have spent much time consolidating his gains. Thus, Ballala II was able to push the northern boundaries of the Hoysala empire up to the Malaprabha River and Krishna Rivers. By c. 1192, Ballala II had crowned himself the emperor over the entire modern Karnataka region. A record of his dated c. 1196 claims him victorious over several minor ruling families including those of Banavasi, Hangal, Halashi, Nolambavadi (Nolamba dynasty), Bagalkot, and Gulbarga (Yelburgi) indicating he had complete control over the rich Tungabhadra-Krishna River region. After c. 1212, he lost all these territories north of the Tungabhadra River to Yadava king Singhana II.

== Relationship with Cholas ==
Around c. 1216, Maravarman Sundara Pandya ascended the throne at Madurai. To seek revenge for the humiliation of his elder brother Jatavarman Kulashekara by the Chola monarch Kulothunga III, he invaded the Chola territory and drove Kulothunga into exile. Kulothunga III sought the help of the Hoysalas. Ballala II promptly sent his forces under the command of prince Narasimha II who succeeded in repulsing the Pandya and re-establishing the Chola kingdom. With this victory, Ballala II not only assumed imperial titles such as Cholarajyapratishtacharya ("Establisher of the Chola kingdom"), Hoysala Chakravarti ("Hoysala emperor") and Dakshina Chakravarti ("Emperor of the south"), he also brought under his direct control parts of the rich Kaveri plains around Srirangam (central Tamil Nadu). A Hoysala army was left standing in Kanchi to pursue hostilities with the Telugu Chodas and their overlords, the Kakatiya dynasty. In words of historian John Keay, "Gloriously if briefly the Hoysalas were paramount throughout most of the Kannada speaking Deccan, and could pose a arbiters in the lusher lands below the Eastern Ghats".

== Patron of art and architecture ==
Veera Ballala II was a great patron of Kannada literature. Janna, one of the most influential Kannada poets of the 13th century, graced his court and was honored with the title Kavichakravarthi ("Emperor among poets"). His most noteworthy writing and magnum opus, the Yashodhara Charitre (c. 1209) deals with Jain tenets. Nemichandra was court poet to both Ballala II and the Shilahara King Lakshmana of Kholapur. He wrote Lilavati Prabandha (about c. 1170), the earliest available romantic true fiction in Kannada, and an unfinished Jain epic called Neminathapurana at the instance of Ballala II's minister. Rudrabhatta, a noteworthy Brahman writer of the late 12th century was patronized by the king and one of his ministers. He composed the Jagannatha Vijaya in c. 1180, the earliest available Vaishnava epic in the Kannada language.

Ballala II's rule saw the proliferation of the temple construction adhering to the Vesara architecture, a style first made popular by the Western Chalukyas. Some of the best known temples built during his rule were the Kedareshwara temple at Halebidu, the Veera Narayana temple at Belavadi, the Amrutesvara Temple at Amruthapura and the twin ensemble of the Chennakeshava and Nageshvara temples at Mosale.

Ballala II donated Meruhalli village and other lands in 1174 CE for providing food to Jain monks. He further gifted two villages to Vajranandi-Siddhantadeva for the same purpose. Nanjedevaragudda stone inscription of 1192 CE describes the donations by Hoysala rulers and subjects for Jain monks at Abhinava Shantideva temple at Somepur, Hassan district.

| Preceded by Narasimha I | Hoysala; 1173–1220 | Succeeded by Vira Narasimha II |
