= Kedareshwara Temple, Halebidu =

Kedareshwara Temple
- Hindu temple (Hoysala style)
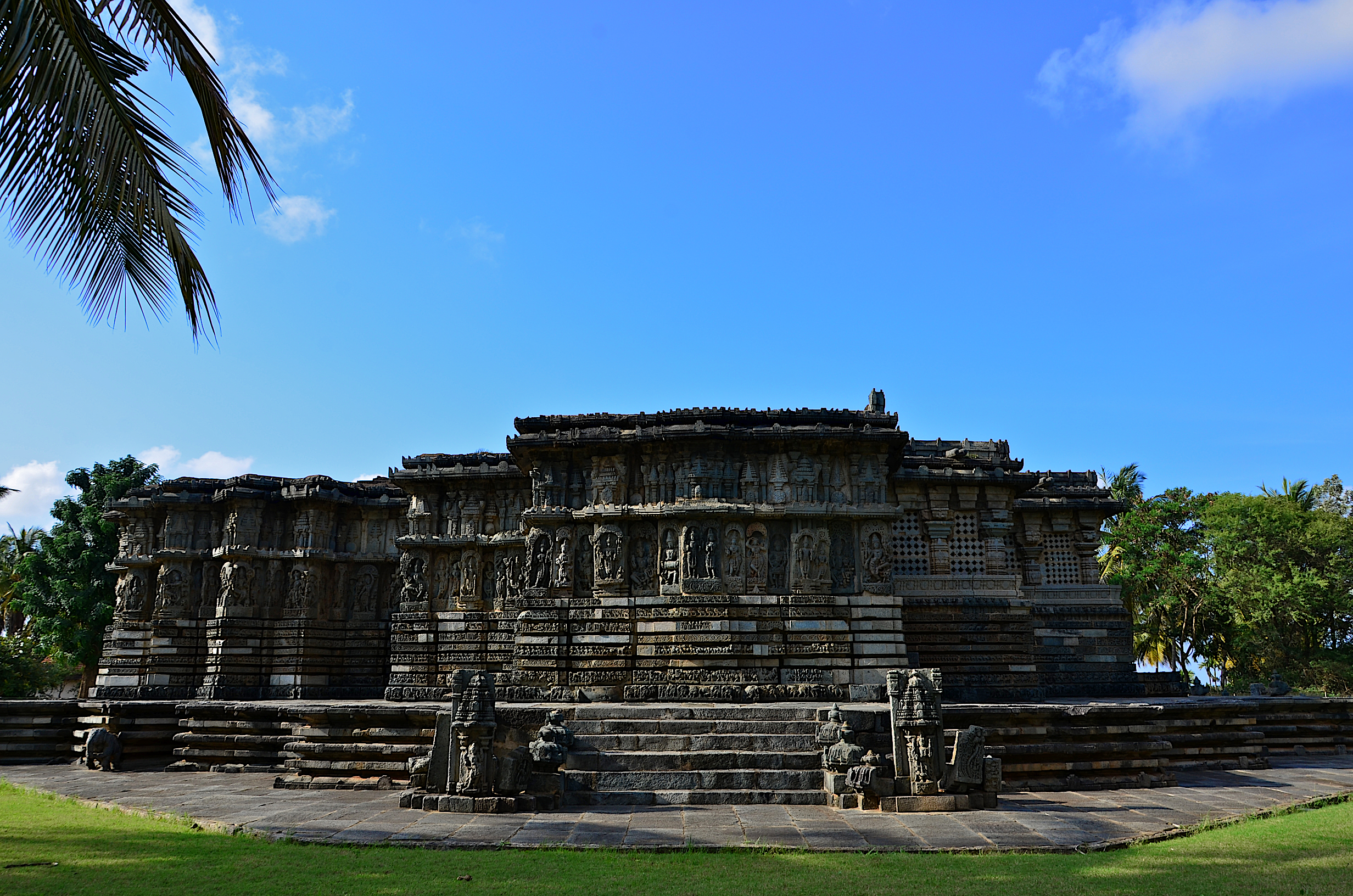
- Kedareshwara Temple, 1173–1219 CE
- Interactive map of Kedareshwara Temple
- Country: India
- State: Karnataka
- District: Hassan District

Languages
  - Official: Kannada
- Time zone: UTC+5:30 (IST)
- PIN: 573121
- ISO 3166 code: IN-KA

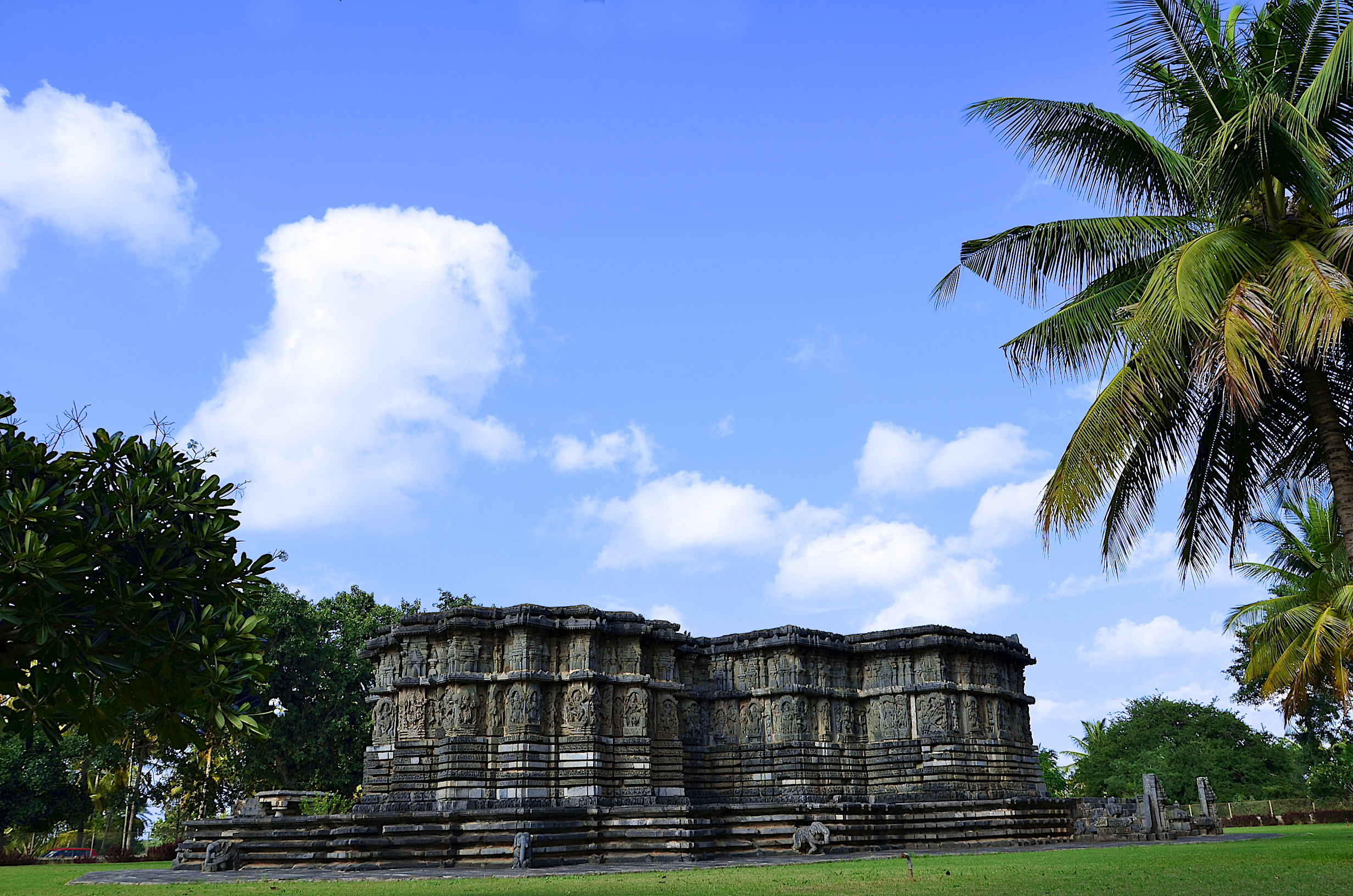
Rear view of the Kedraeshwara temple at Halebidu

Kedareshwara Temple (also spelt "Kedaresvara" or "Kedareshvara") is a Hoysala era construction in the historically important town of Halebidu, in the Hassan district of Karnataka state, India. It is located a short distance away from the famous Hoysaleswara Temple. The temple was constructed by Hoysala King Veera Ballala II (r. 1173–1220 CE) and his Queen Ketaladevi, and the main deity is Ishwara (another name for the Hindu god Shiva). The temple is protected as a monument of national importance by the Archaeological Survey of India.

== Temple plan ==
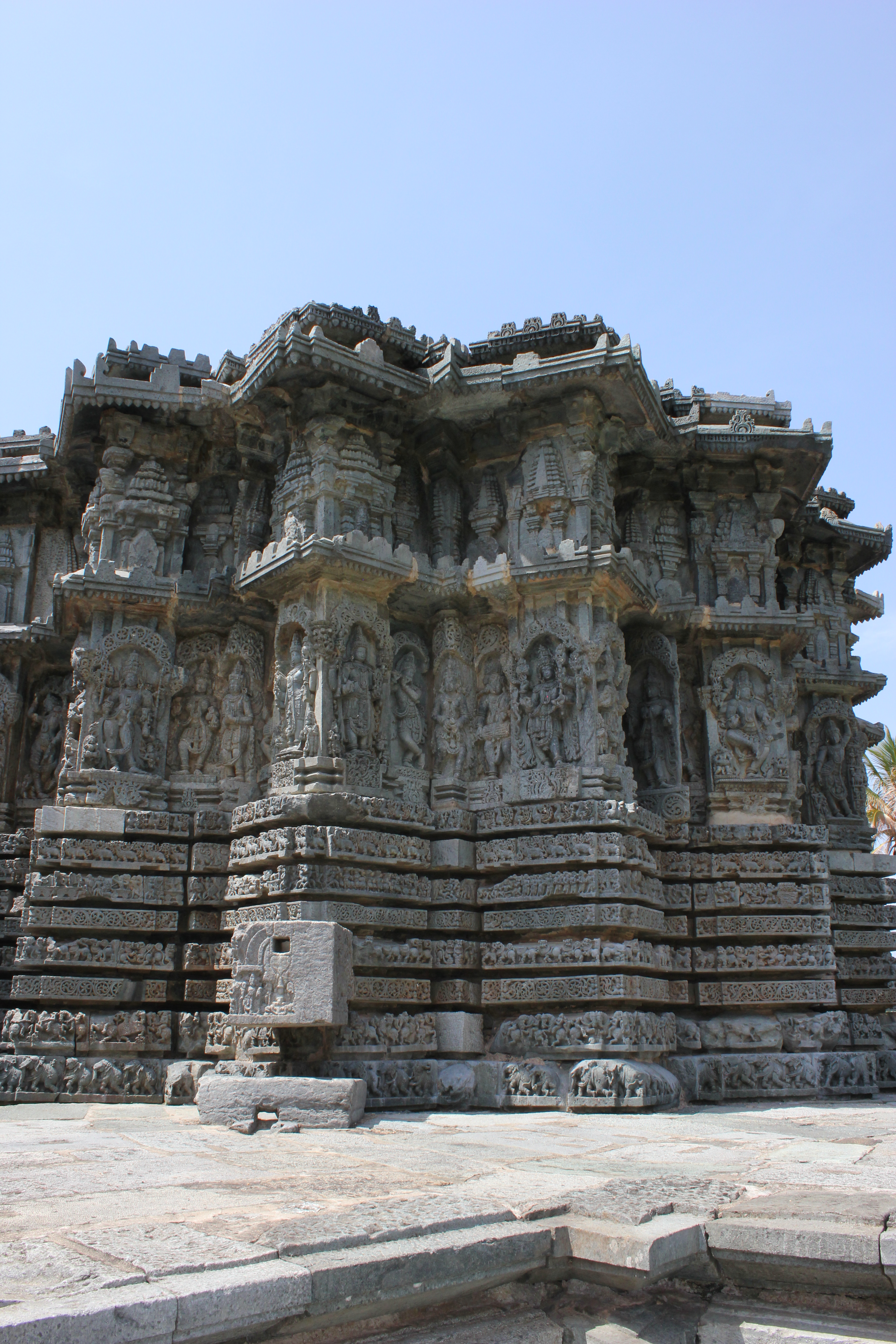
Stellate plan of shrine outer wall in the Kedareshwara temple at Halebidu

According to art historian Adam Hardy, the temple was constructed before 1219 CE and is constructed with Soap stone. The usage of Soap stone was first popularised by the Western Chalukyas before it became standard with the Hoysala architects of the 12th and 13th centuries. The temple stands on the platform called jagati which is typically five to six feet in height and which can be reached by a flight of steps. According to historian Kamath, this is a Hoysala innovation. Hoysala temples normally don't provide a path for circumambulation (pradakshinapatha) around the inner sanctum (garbhagriha). However, the platform provides this convenience in addition to giving the onlooker a good view of the wall relief and sculptures. The outlay of the main shrine (Vimana) is star-shaped (stellate) with two smaller shrines that have perforated windows (called Jali, literally, "sieve") on the sides. According to the art historian Gerard Foekema, star-shaped or "staggered square" (or cross in square) temple plans are quite common among Hoysala constructions, creating multiple projections and recesses in the outer walls. In these projections, the Hoysala architects created repetitive decorative sculptures and reliefs called "architectural articulation".

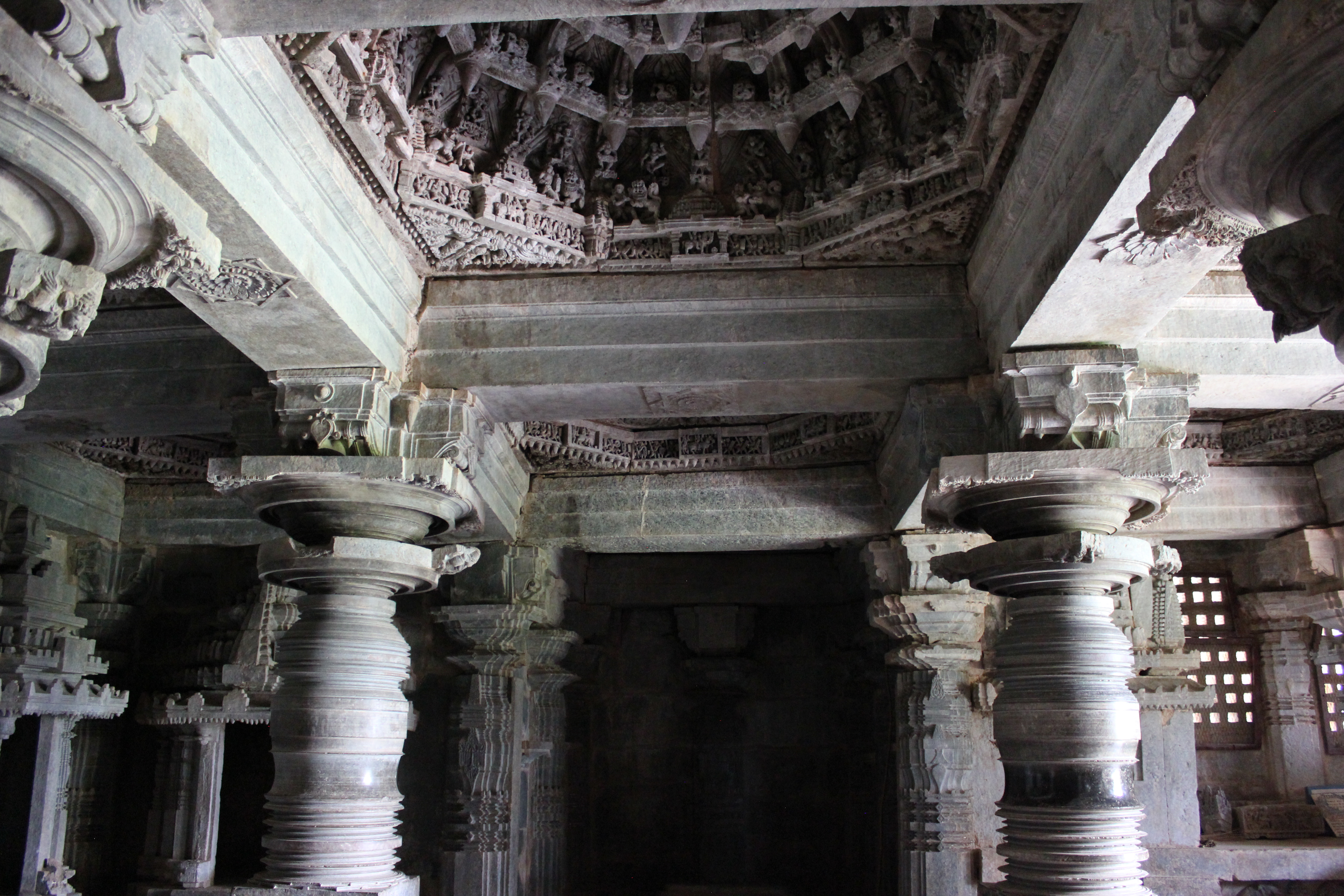
View of central domical bay ceiling supported by lathe turned pillars in the mantapa in the Kedareshwara temple at Halebidu

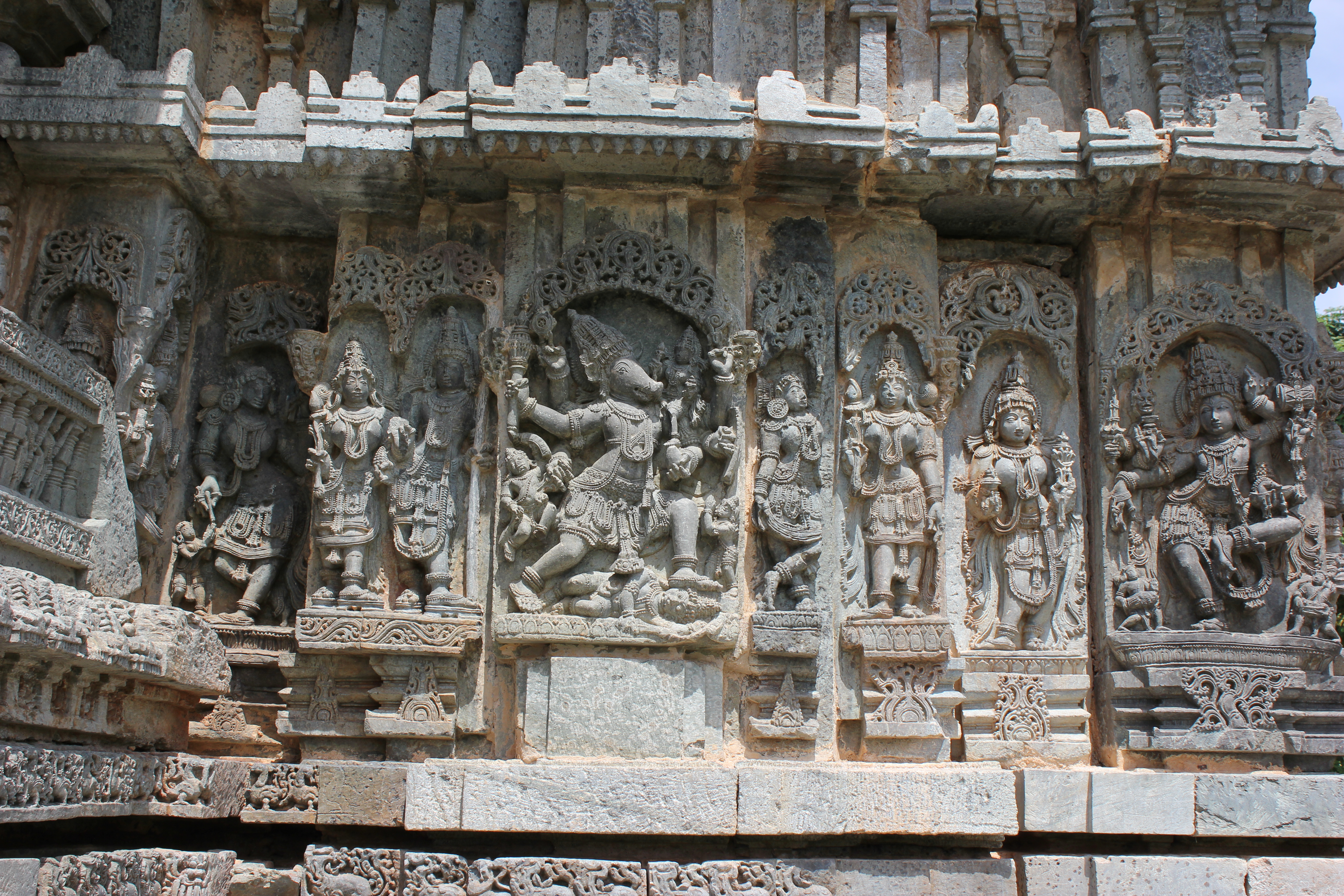
Wall panel relief of deities in the Kedareshwara temple at Halebidu

Since the temple has three shrines, it qualifies as a trikuta, a three shrined structure. Often in trikutas, only the central shrine has a tower while the lateral shrines are virtually hidden behind the thick outer walls and appear to be a part of the hall itself. Despite being a Shaiva temple (related to god Shiva) it is well known for its friezes and panel relief that bear depictions from both the Shaiva and Vaishnava (related to the god Vishnu) legend. The three sanctums are connected to a "staggered square" (indented) central hall (mahamantapa) by individual vestibules called sukanasi. A porch connects the central hall to the platform. The base of the temple wall (adhisthana) around the common hall and the two lateral shrines consist of mouldings, each of which is treated with friezes in relief that depict animals and episodes from the Hindu lore (purana). Historian Kamath calls this "horizontal treatment". The image of the deity of worship is missing in all three sanctums and the superstructure over all three shrines are lost. Some noteworthy pieces of sculpture worthy of mention are the dancing Bhairava (a form of Shiva), Govardhana (the god Krishna lifting a mountain), the god Vishnu as Varadaraja, and a huntress.

== Gallery ==
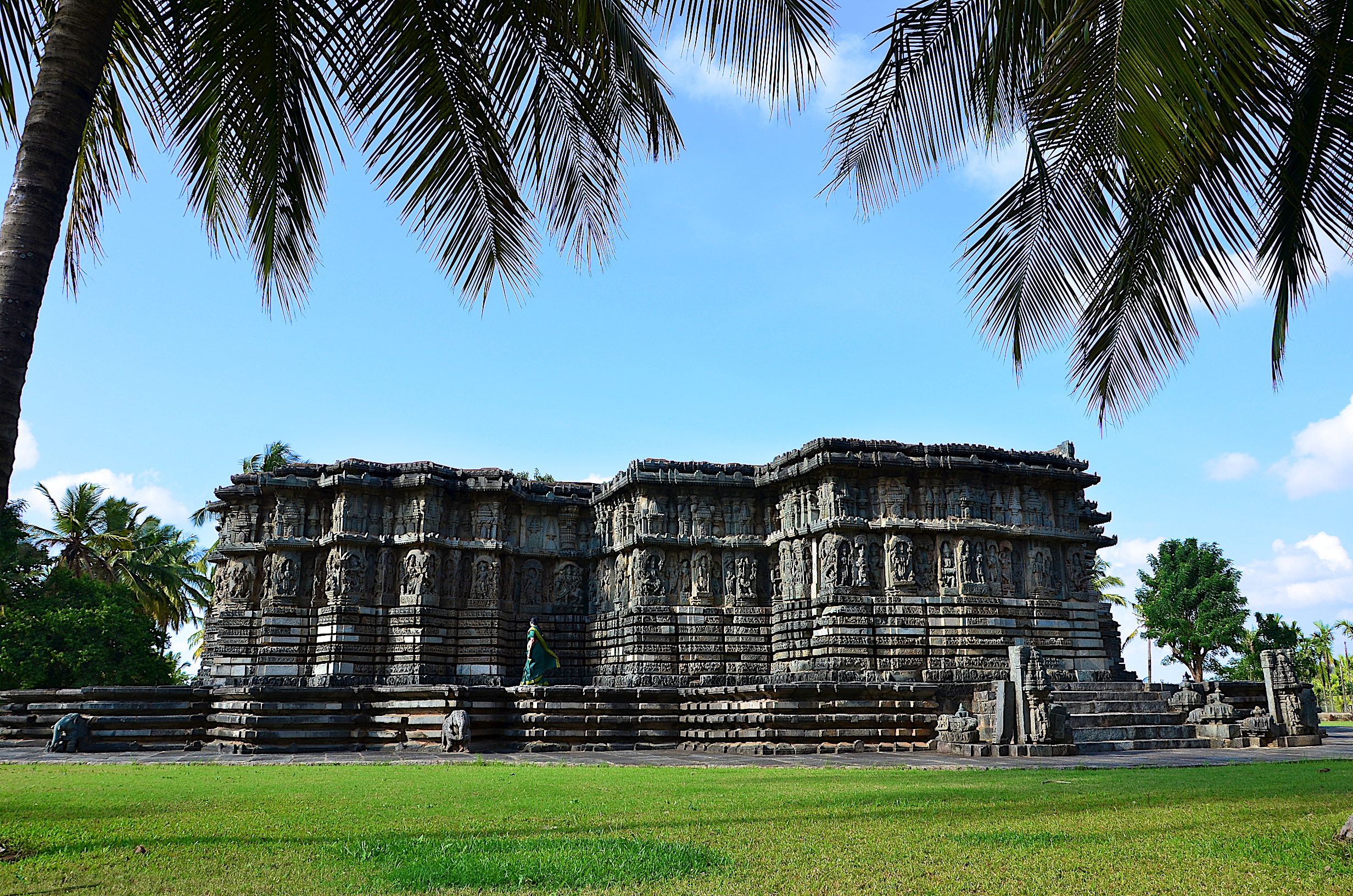
Another view of Kedareshwara temple at Halebidu

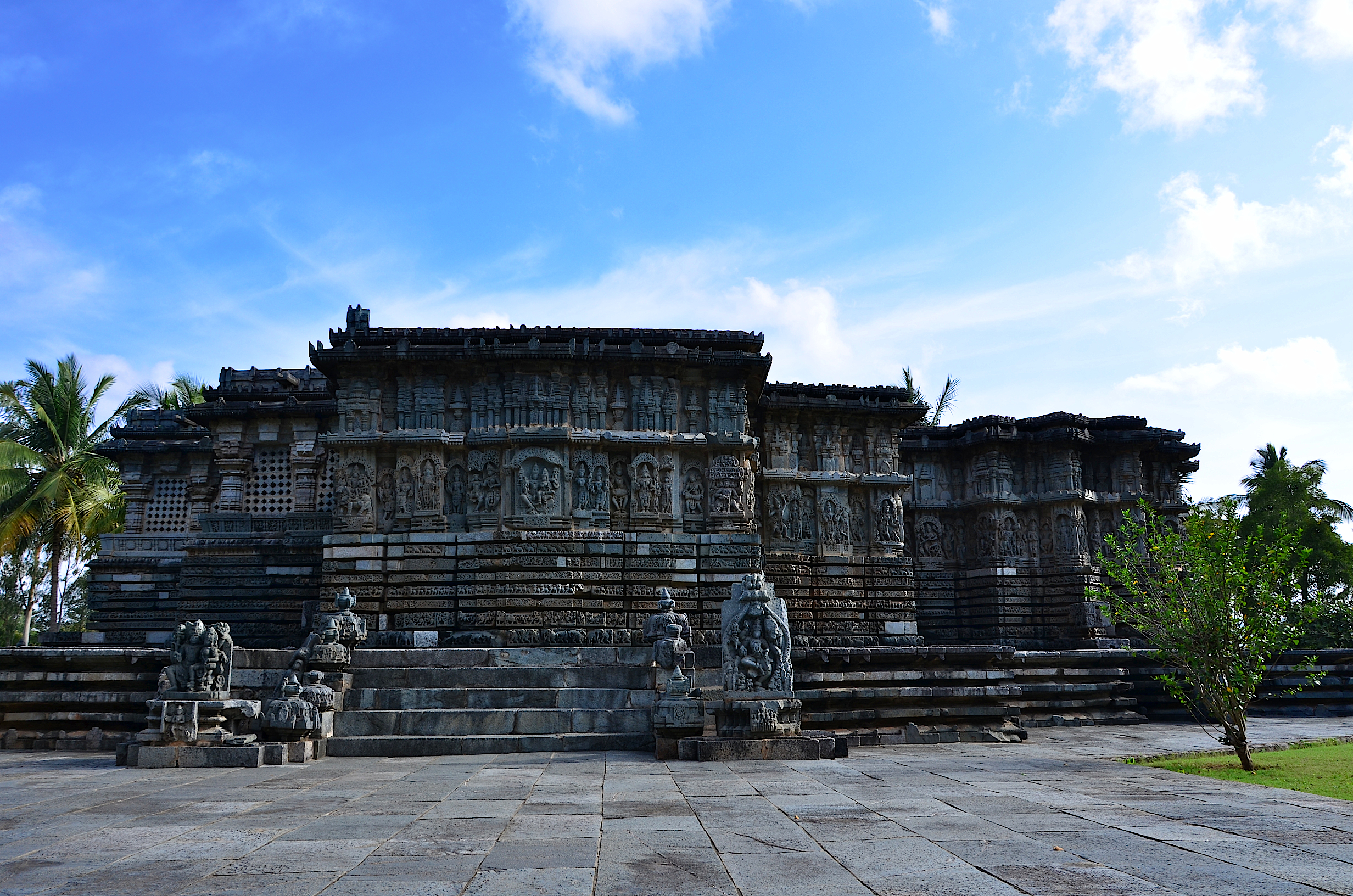
Another profile view of the Kedareshawara temple at Halebidu

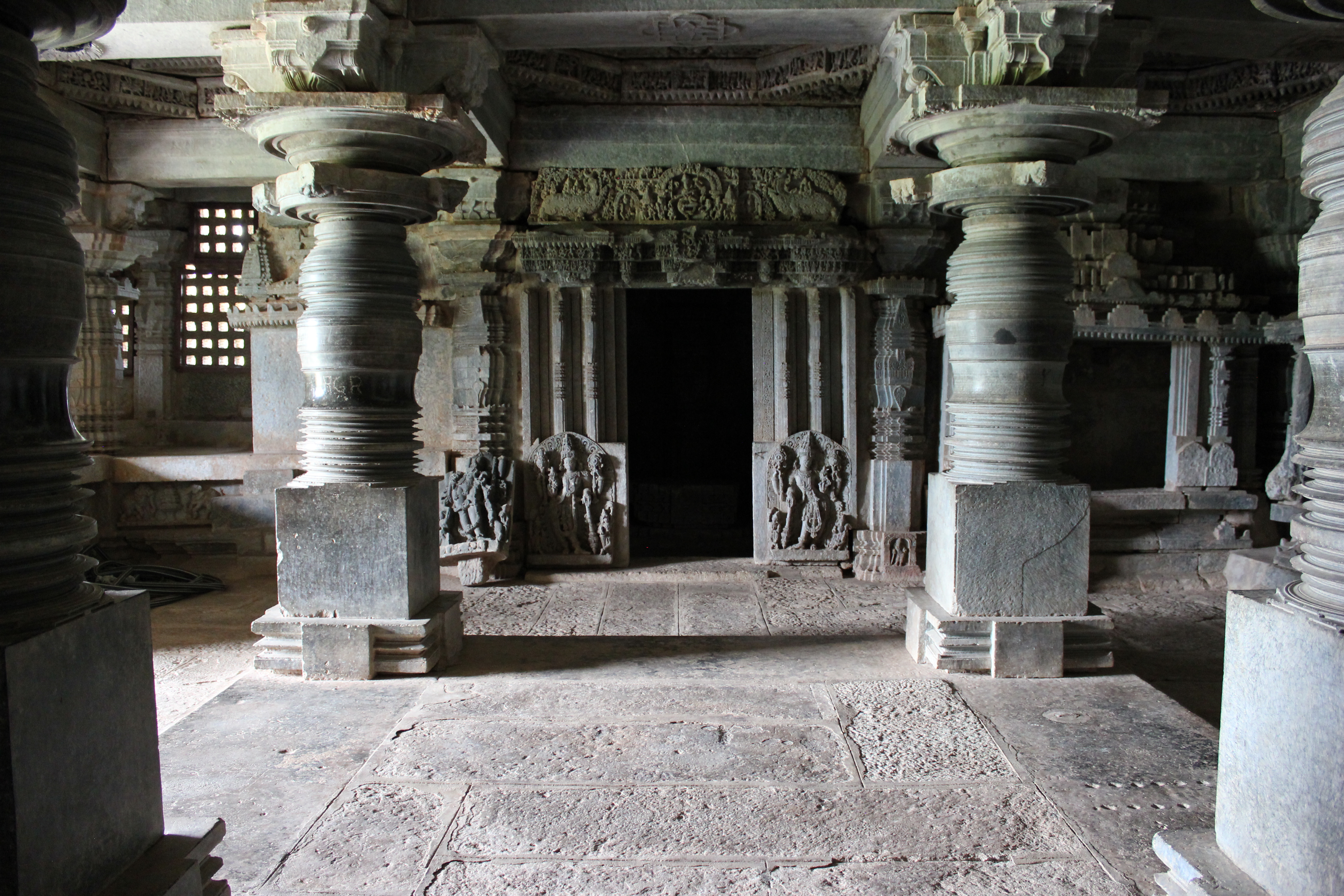
Ornate doorjamb and lintel over entrance into a sanctum in the Kedareshwara temple at Halebidu

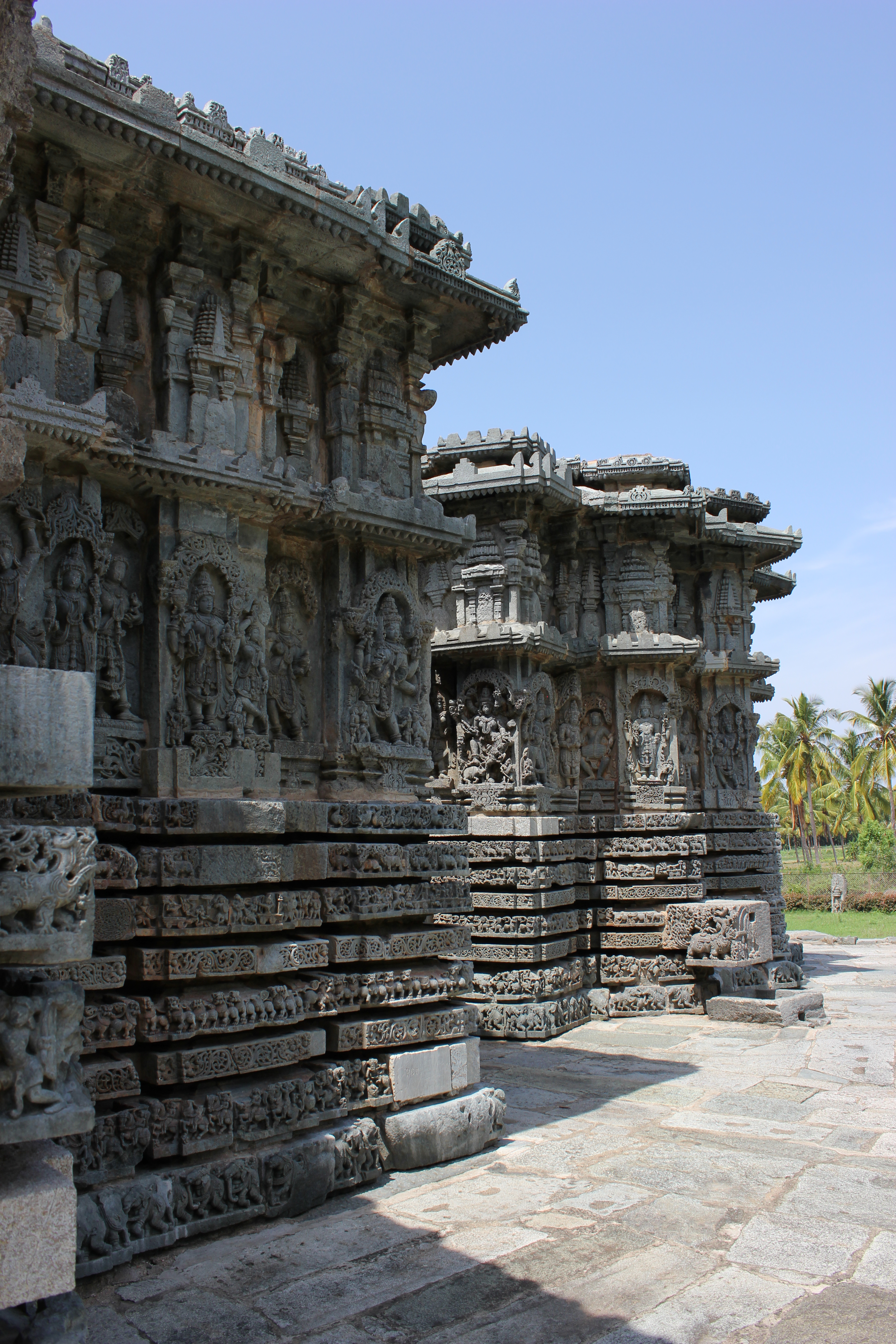
Profile of square mantapa and stellate shrine in the Kedareshwara temple at Halebidu

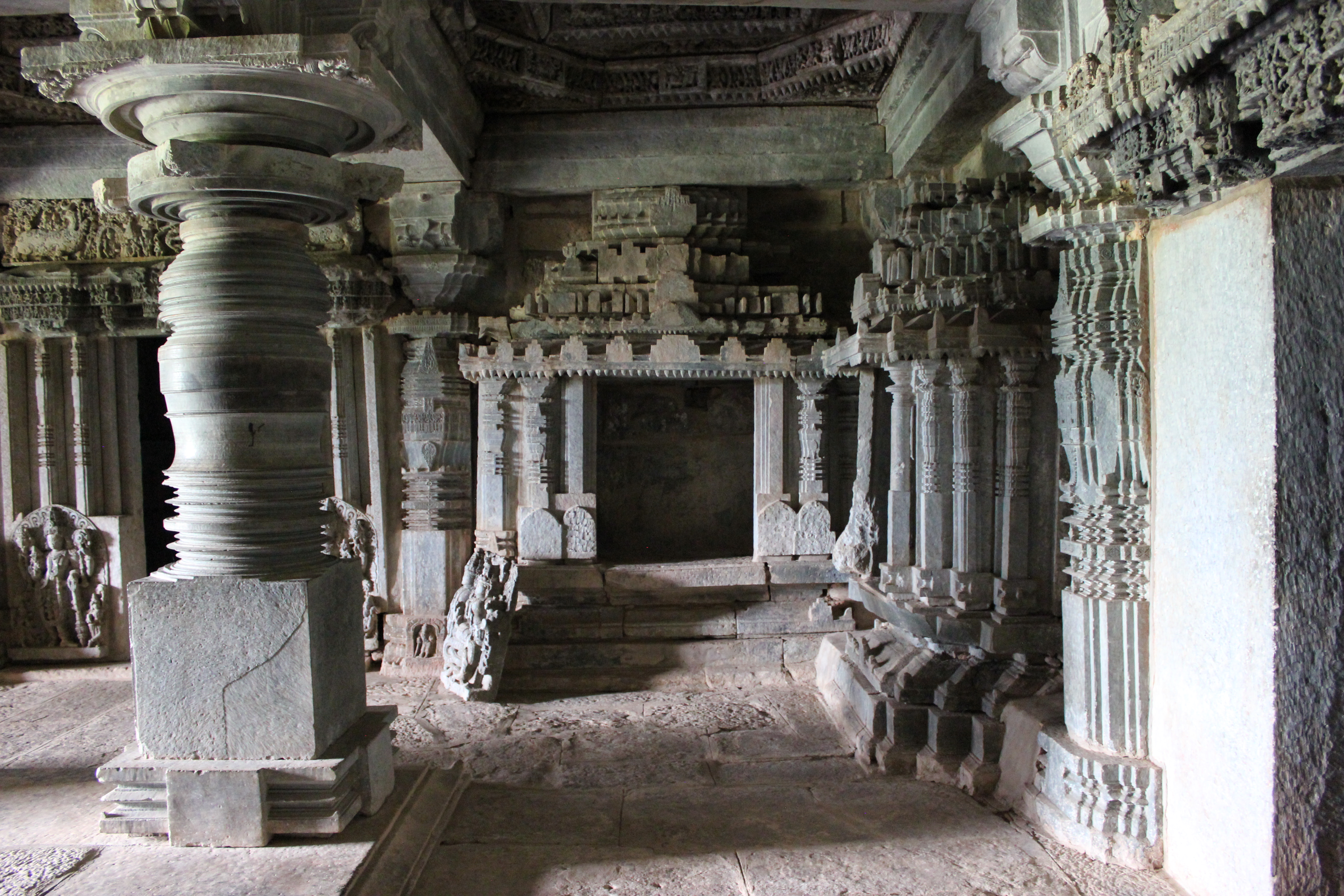
Ornate aedicula inside mantapa in the Kedareshwara temple at Halebidu

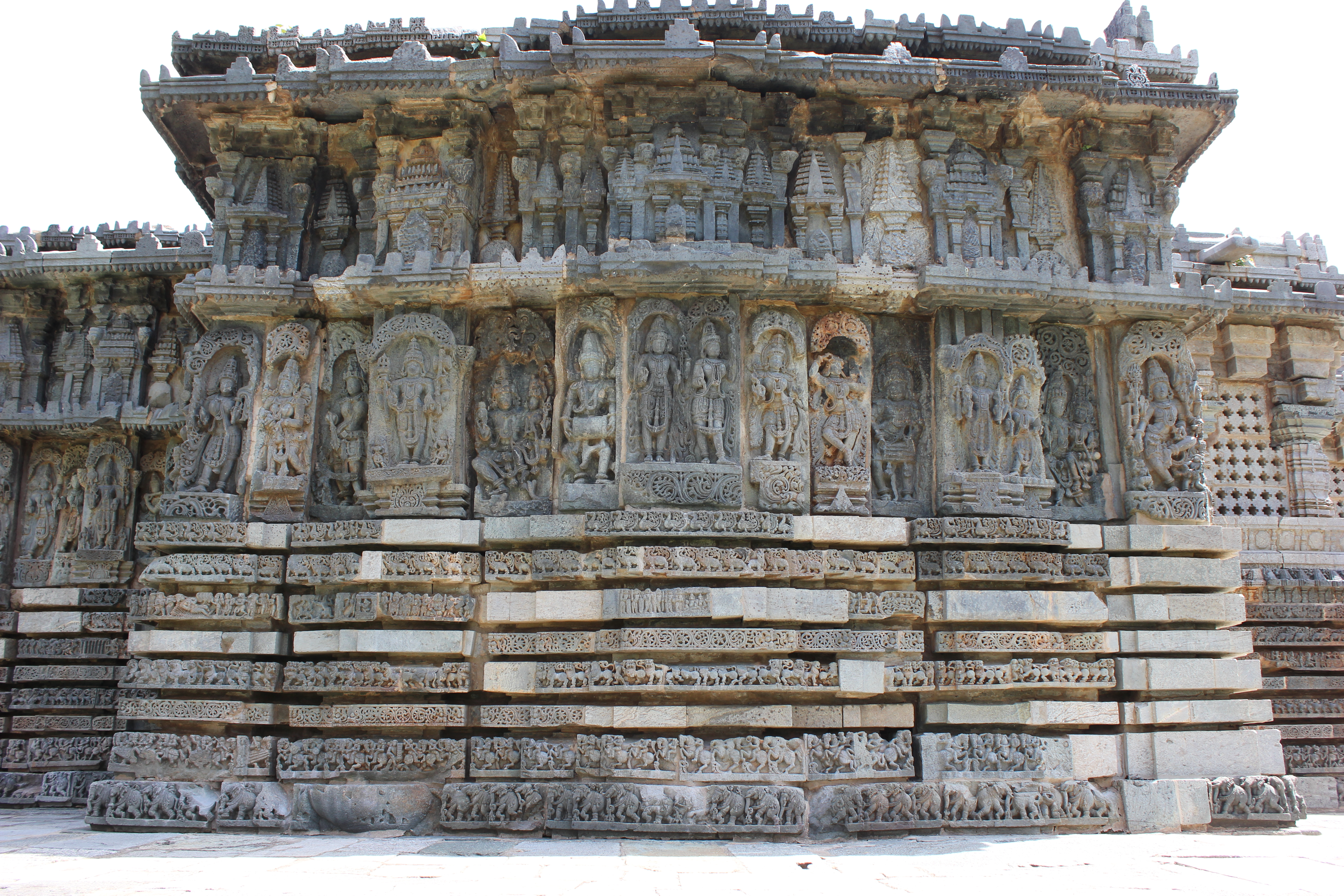
Molding frieze and outer wall decoration in the Kedareshwara temple at Halebidu

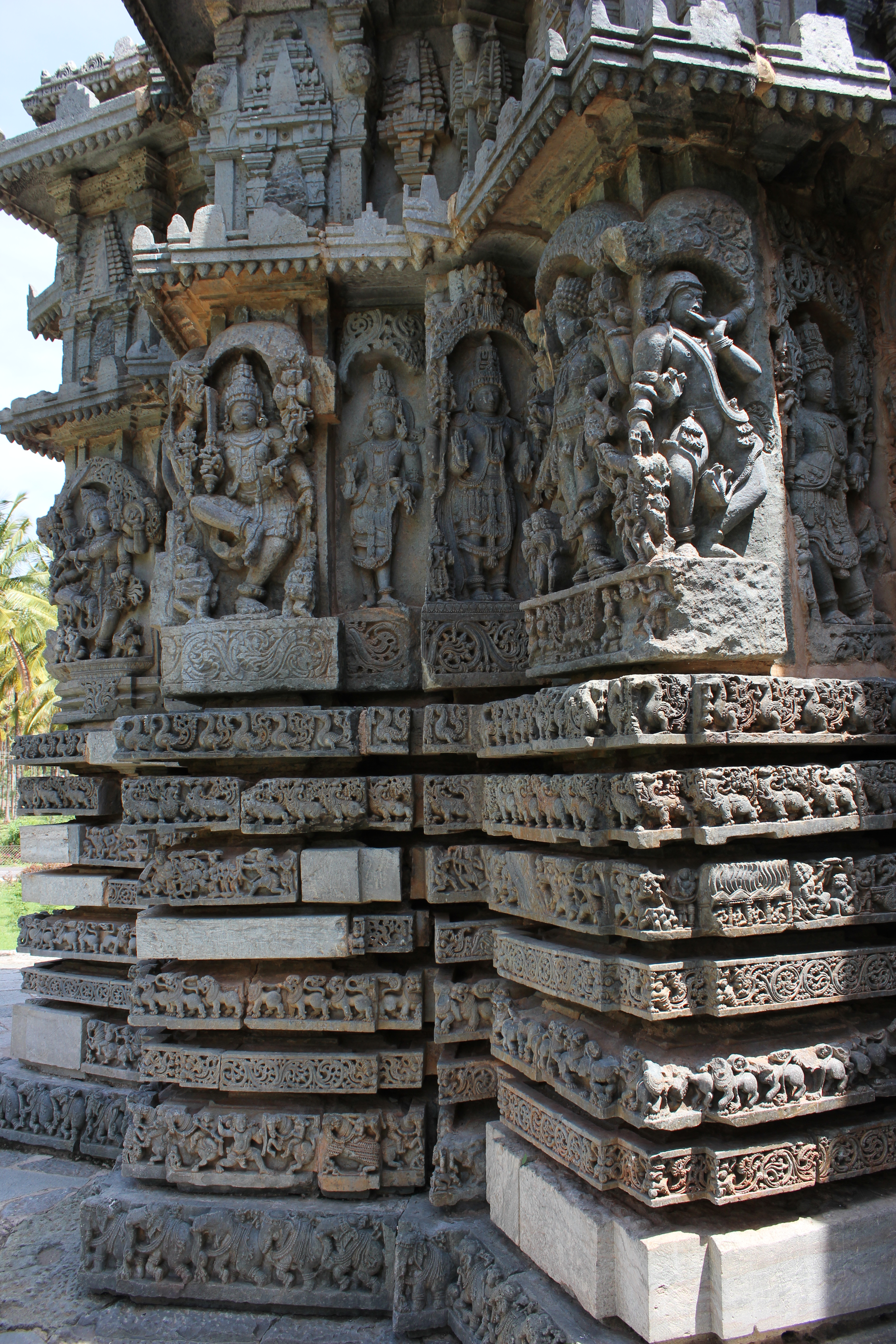
Close up of stellate points showing moulding and wall relief sculpture of Hindu deities in the Kedareshwara temple at Halebidu

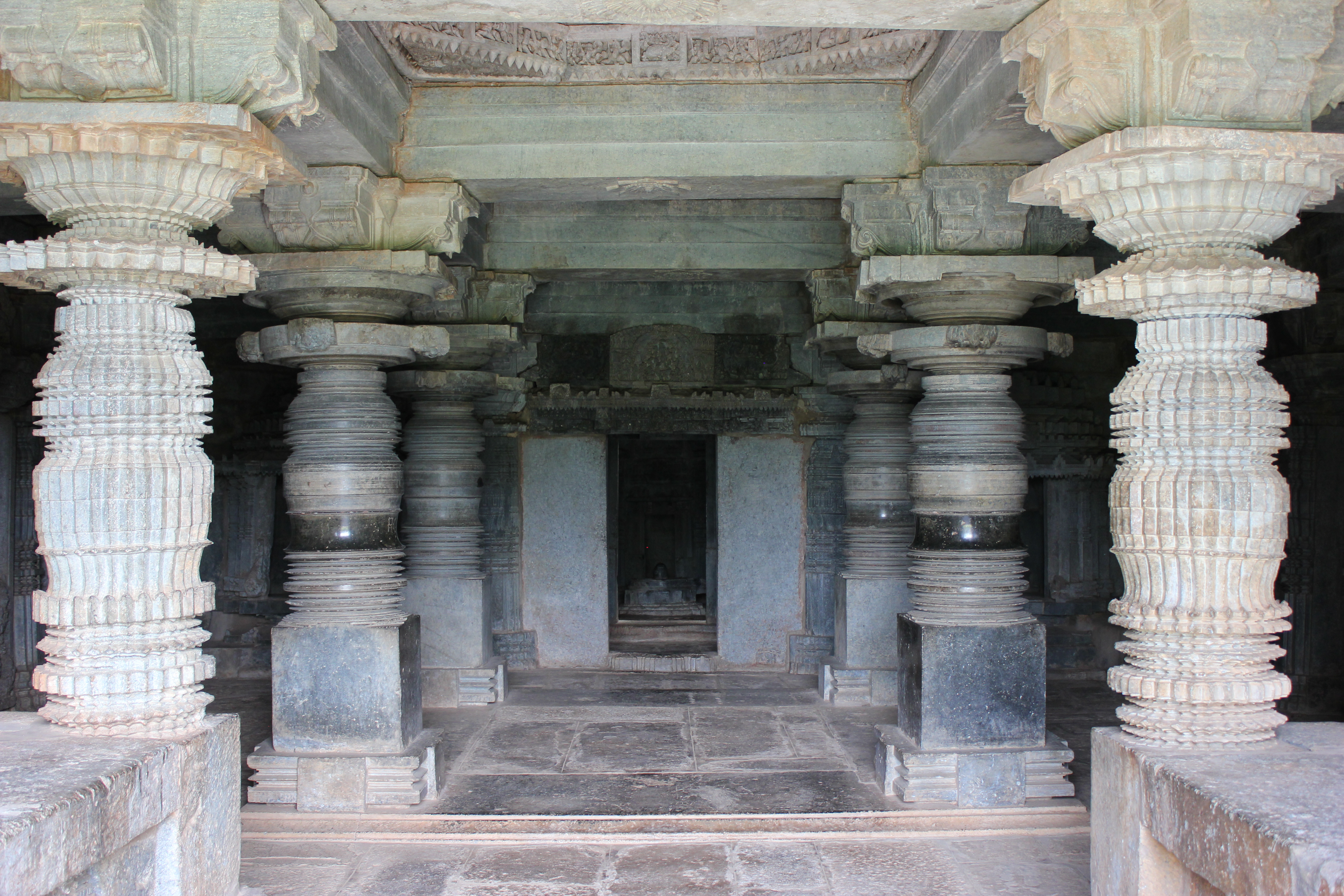
Lathe turned pillars support bay ceiling in the Kedareshwara temple at Halebidu

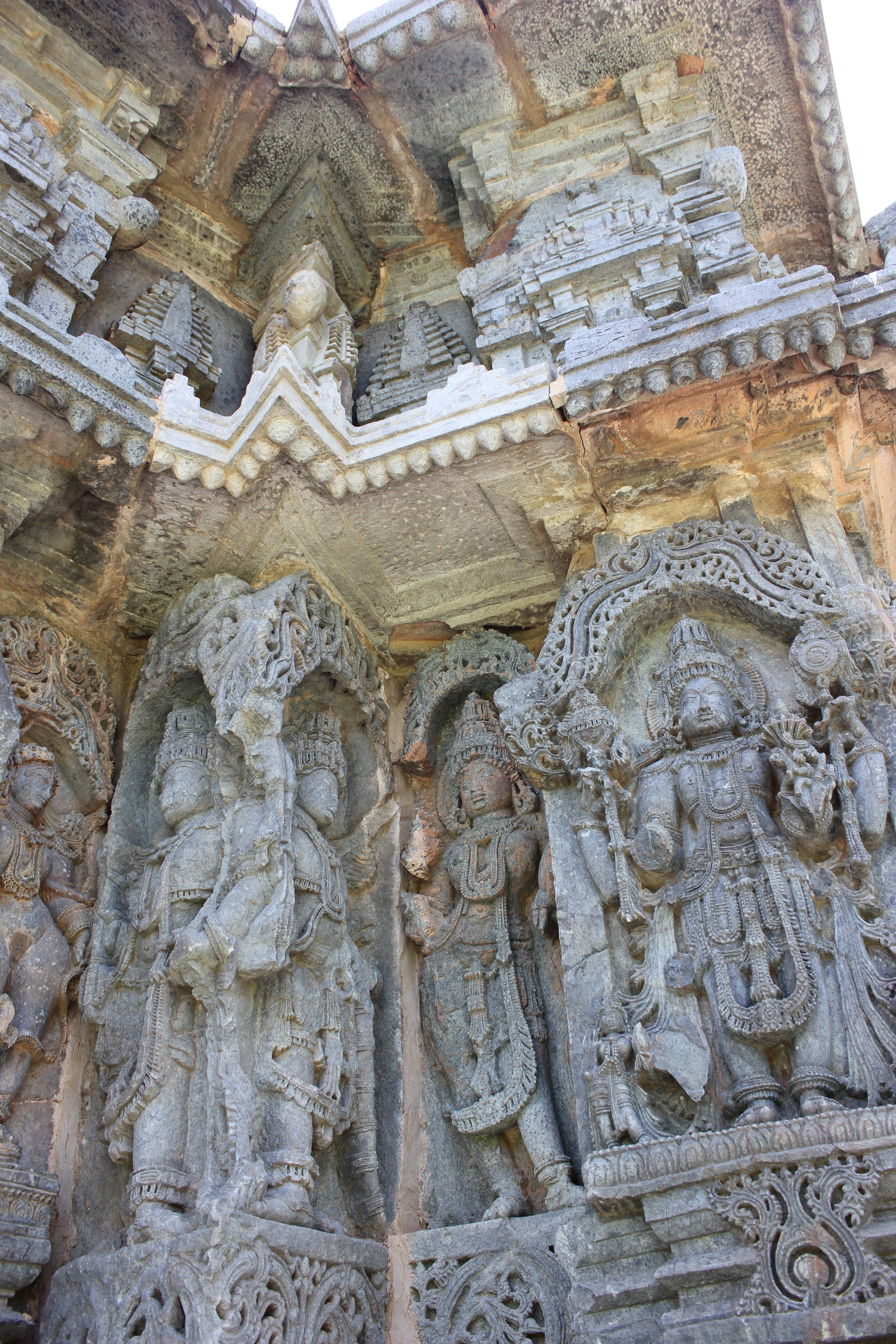
Relief of Hindu deities below lower eve and miniature decorative towers above it (below upper eve) in the Kedareshwara temple at Halebidu

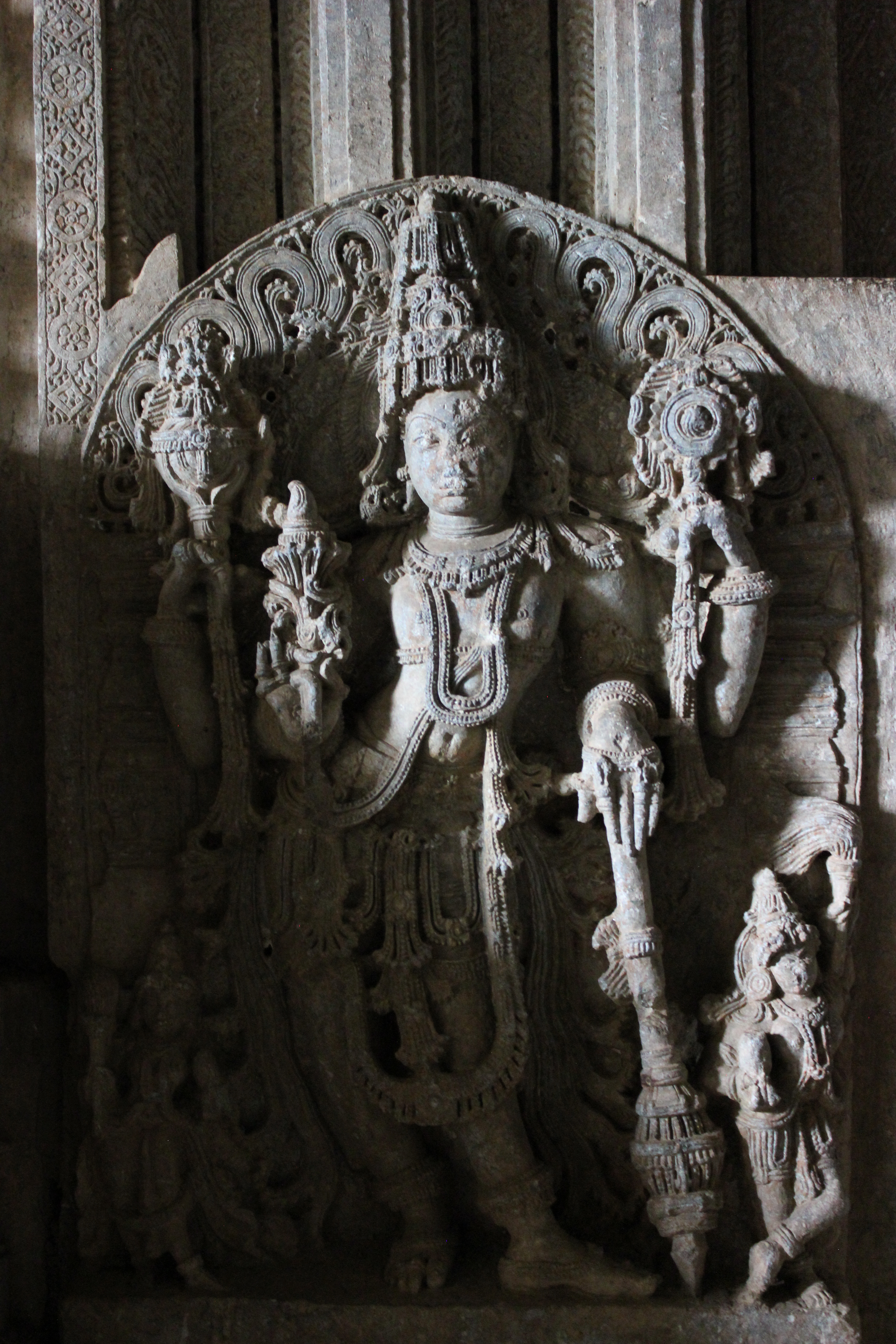
Sculpture of a Hindu deity in the Kedareshwara temple at Halebidu

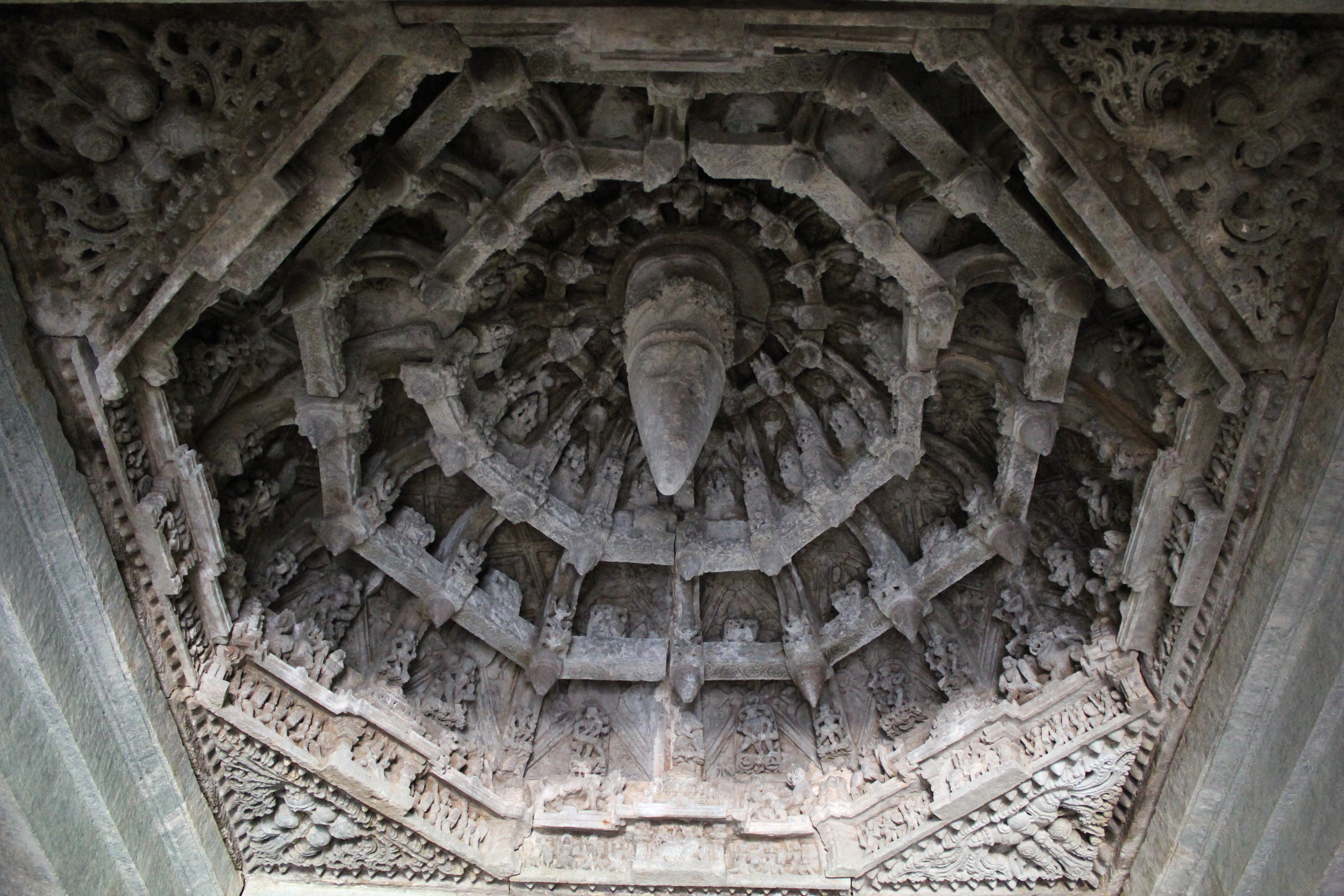
Bay ceiling in the Kedareshwara temple at Halebidu

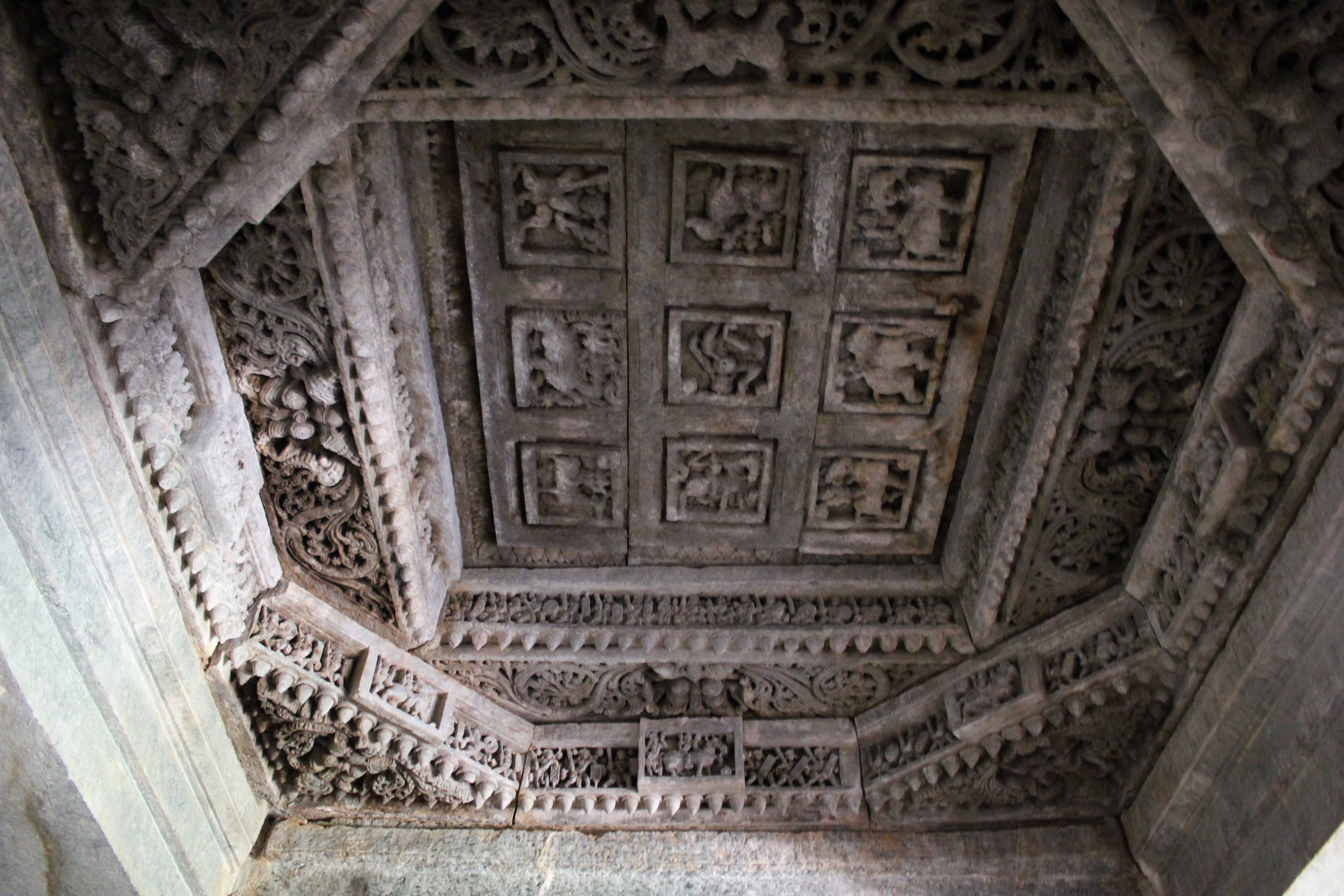
Bay ceiling in the Kedareshwara temple at Halebidu
