= Anegola Kikkeri =

Village in Karnataka state, India

Coordinates: 12°50′36″N 76°23′45″E

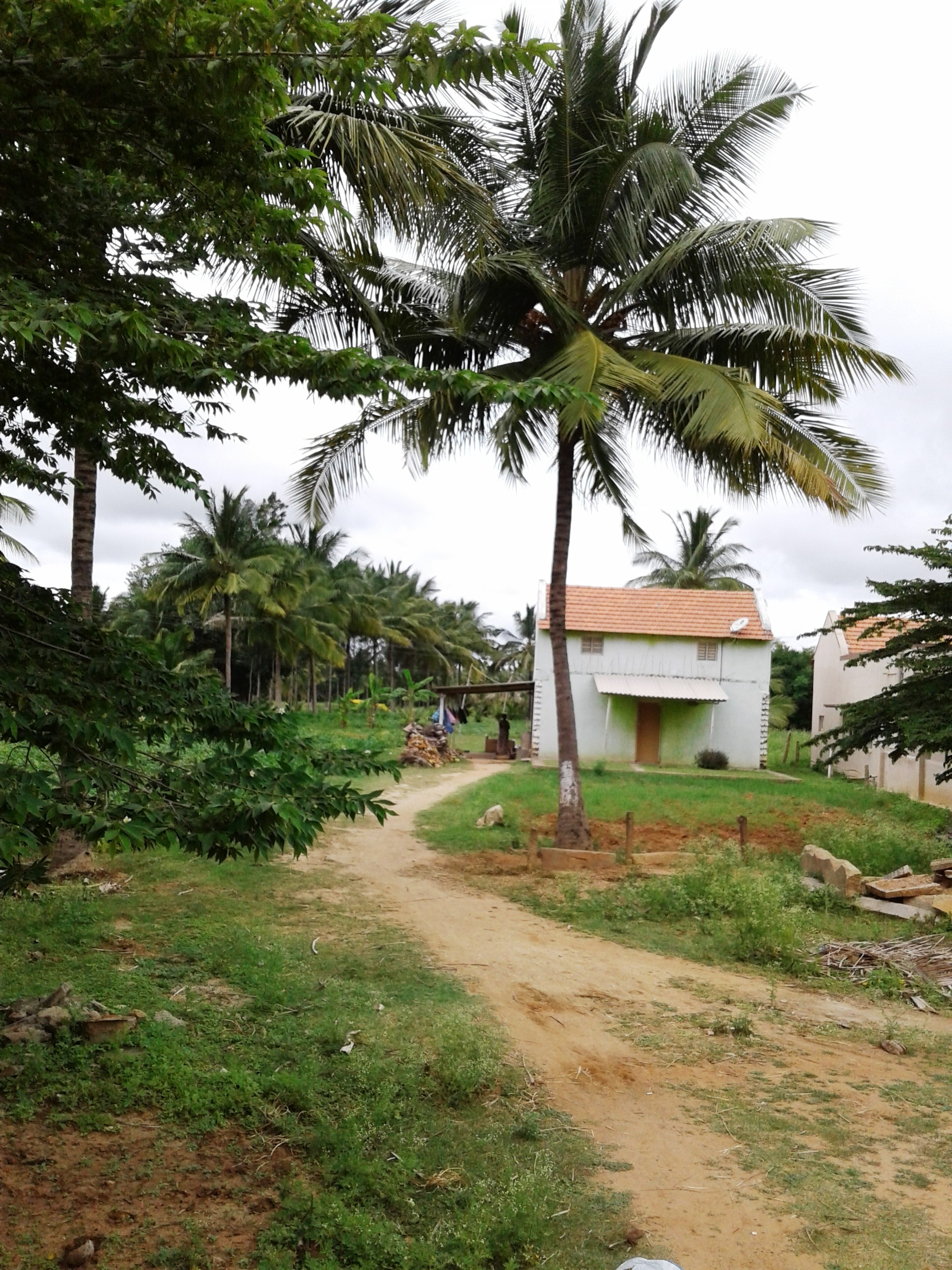
Angola village

Anegola Kikkeri is a small village in Mandya District of Karnataka state, India.

== Location ==
Anegola Kikkeri is located between Kikkeri and Channarayapatna towns on Mysore-Arsikere Road.

== Postal code ==
There is a post office in the village and the Pin Code is 571423.

== Gallery ==
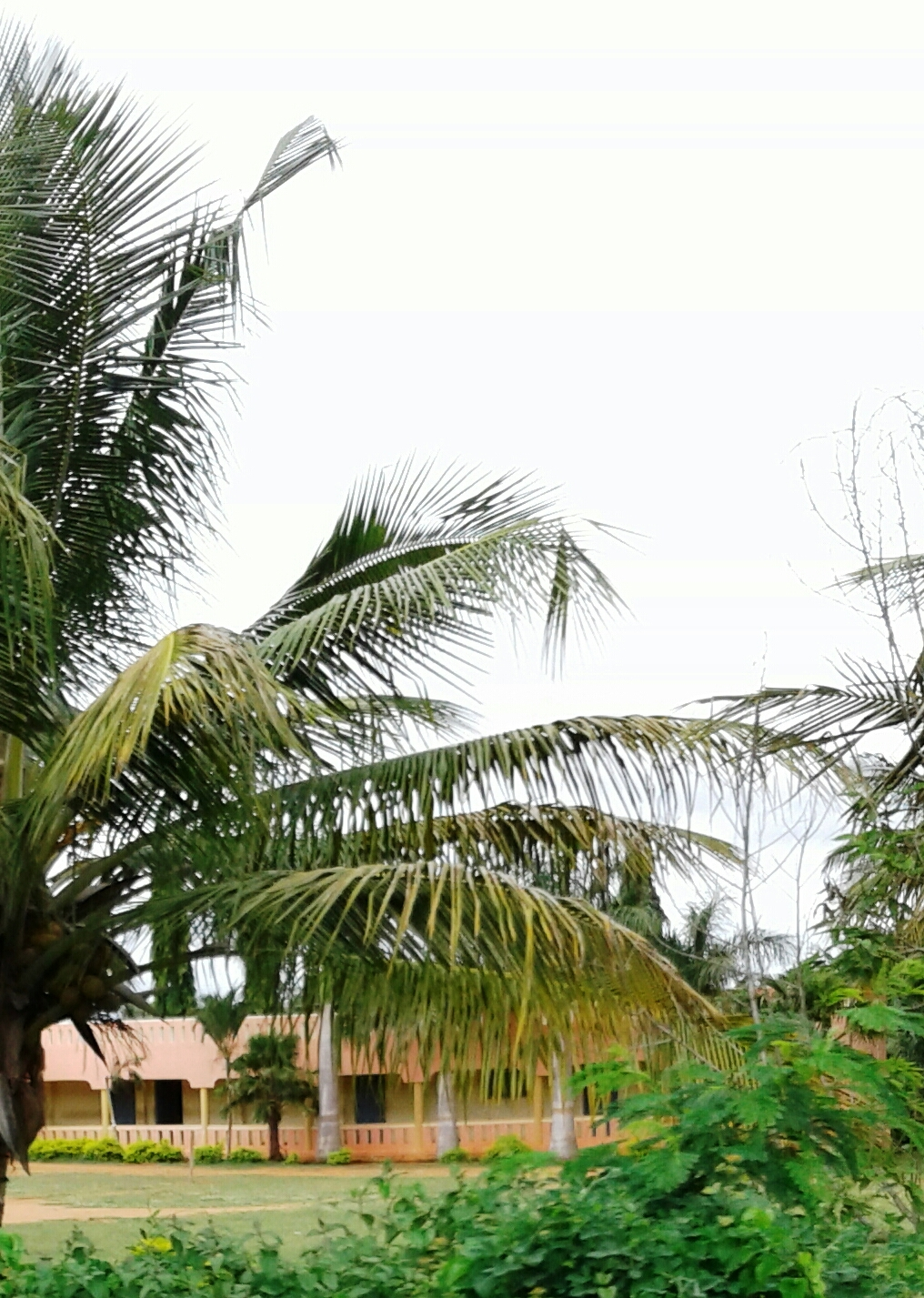
Angola School

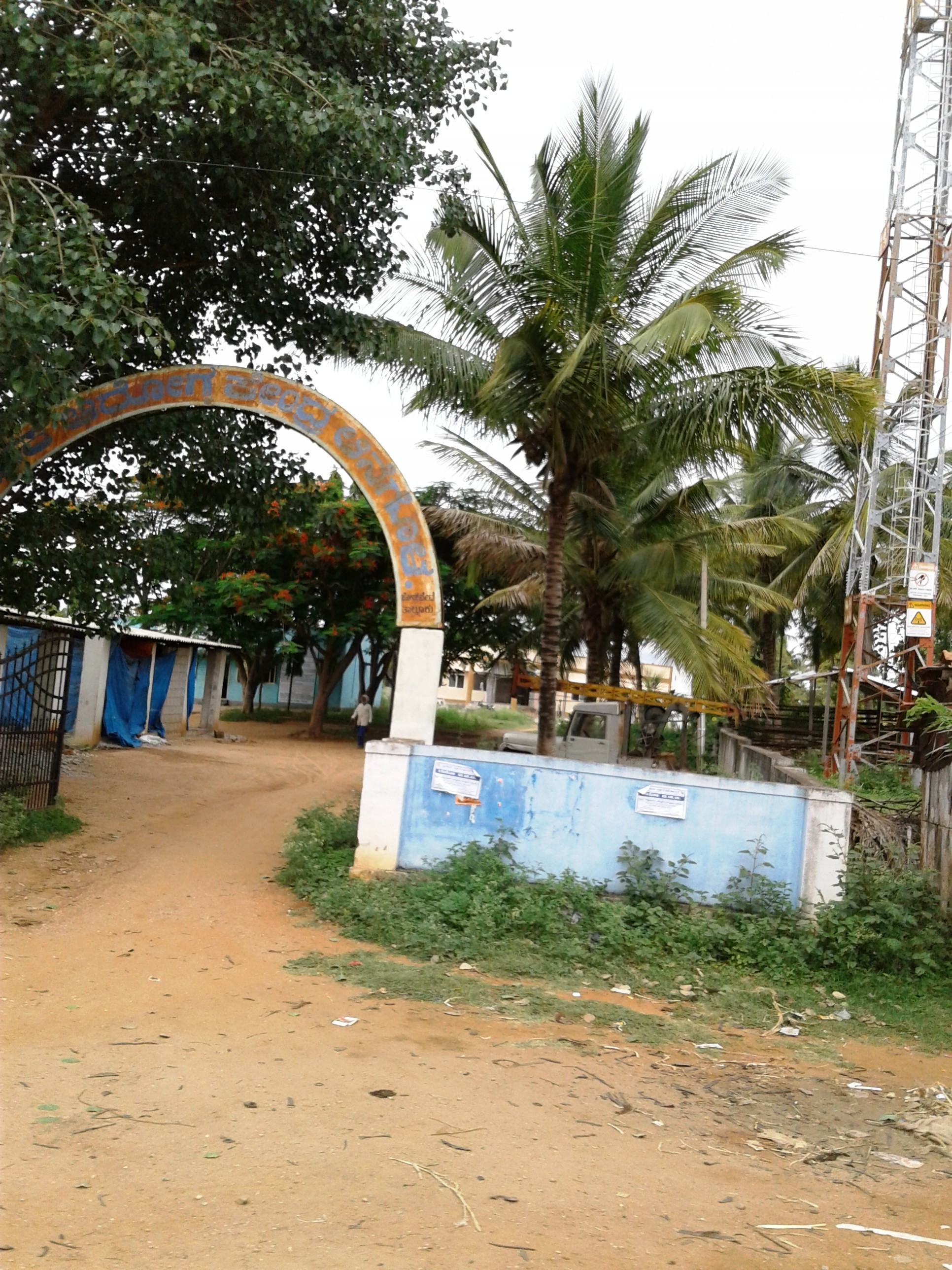
Angola Junction

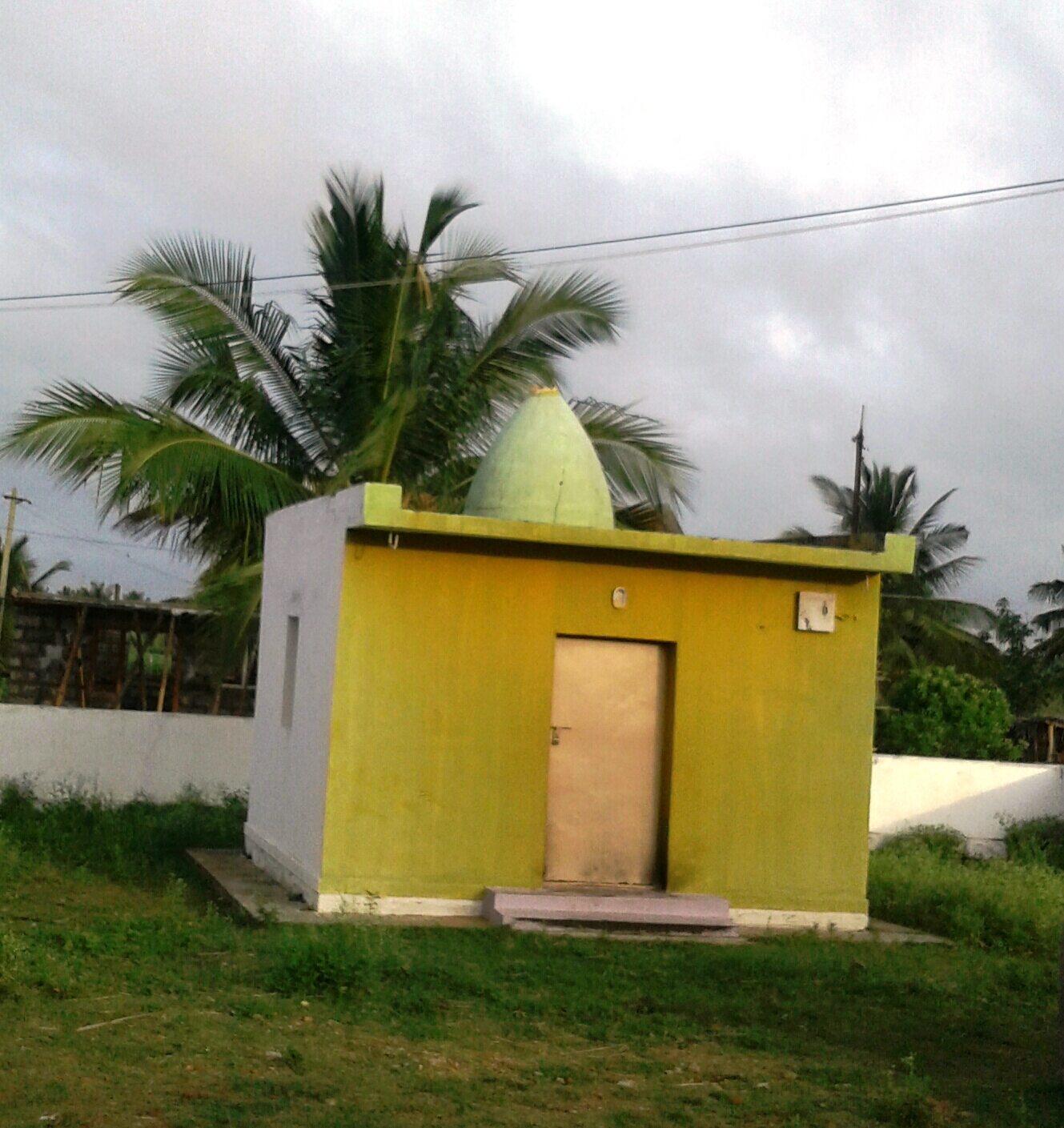
Basavanahalli Temple

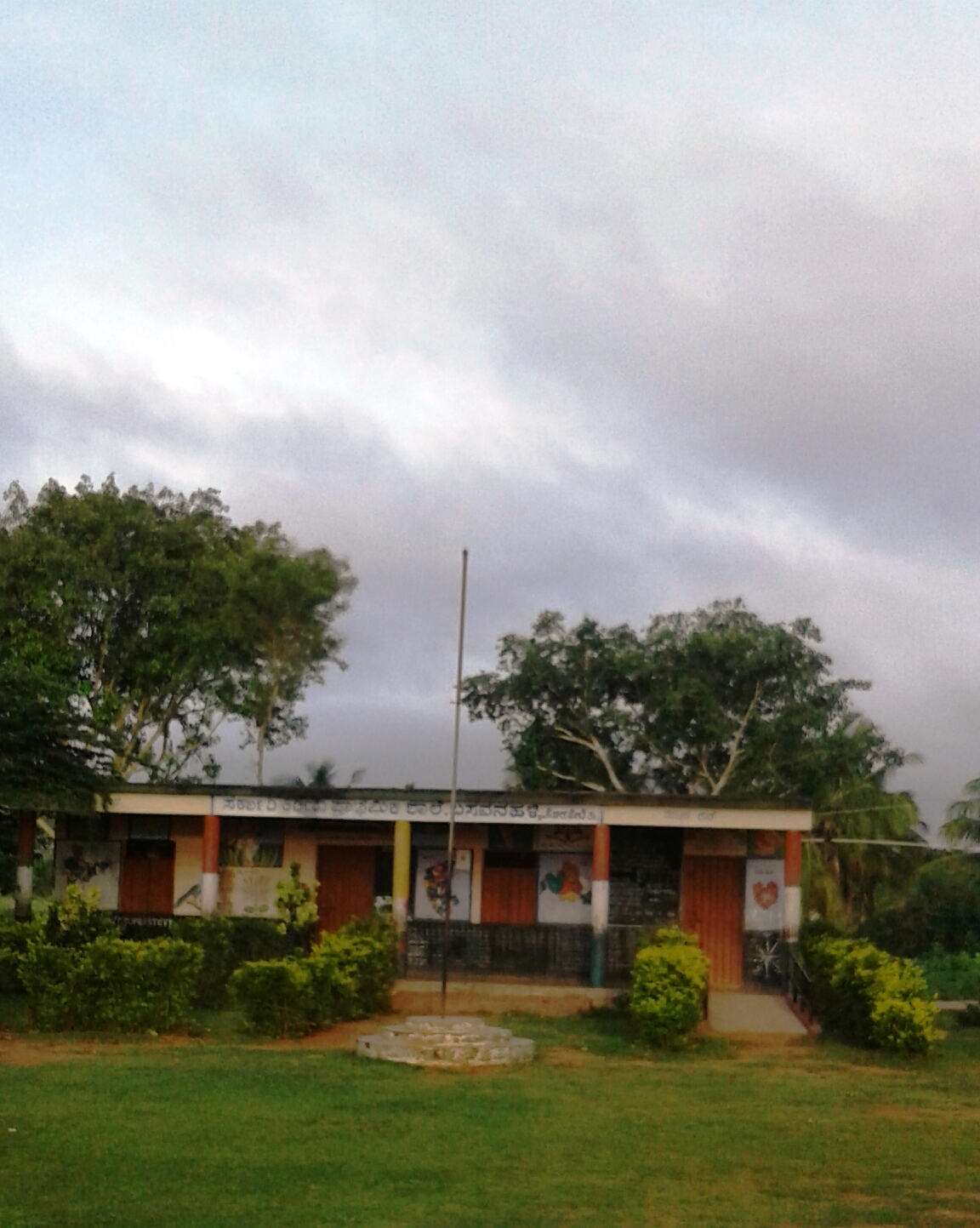
Basavanahalli

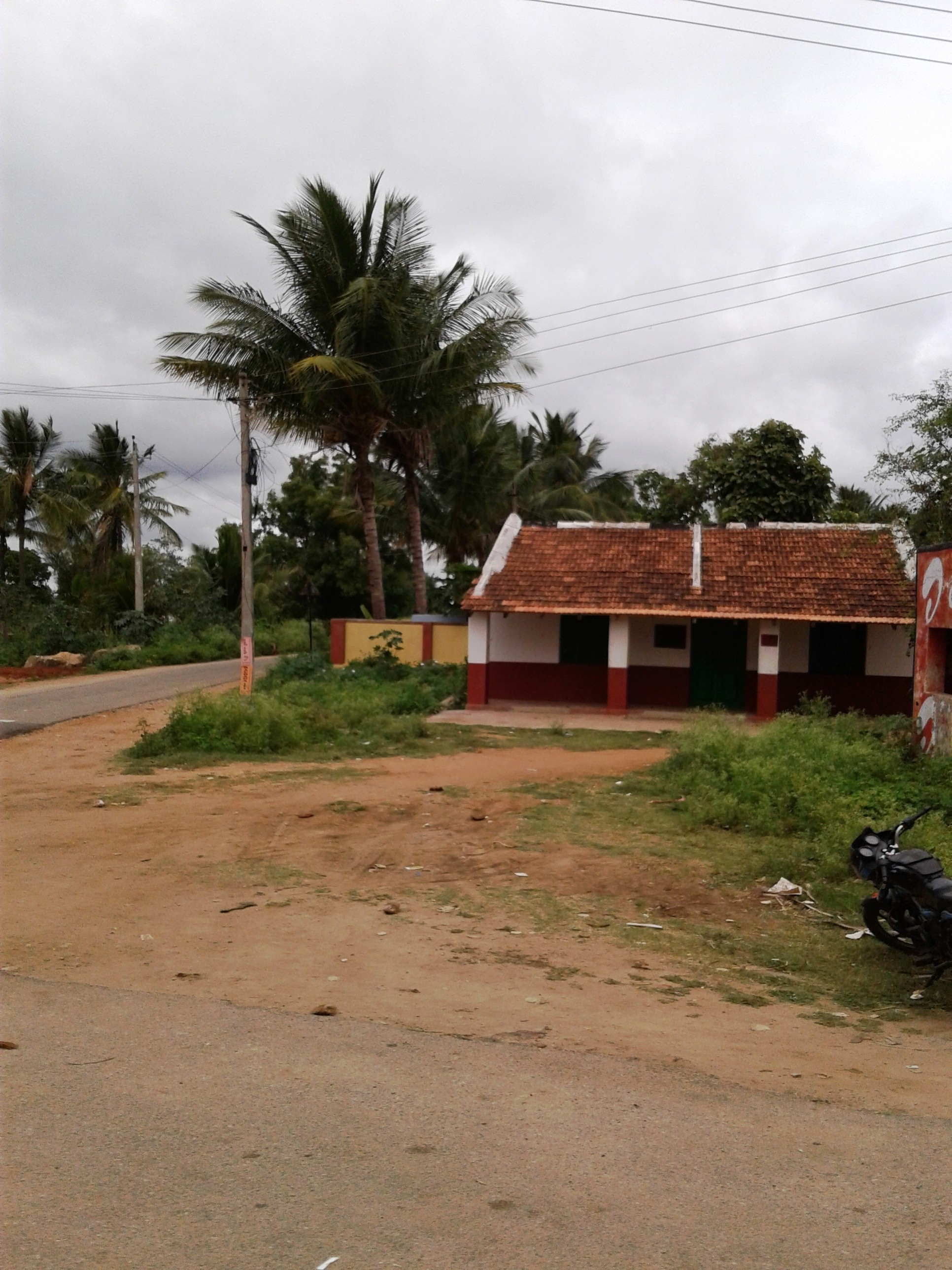
Mandalekanahalli

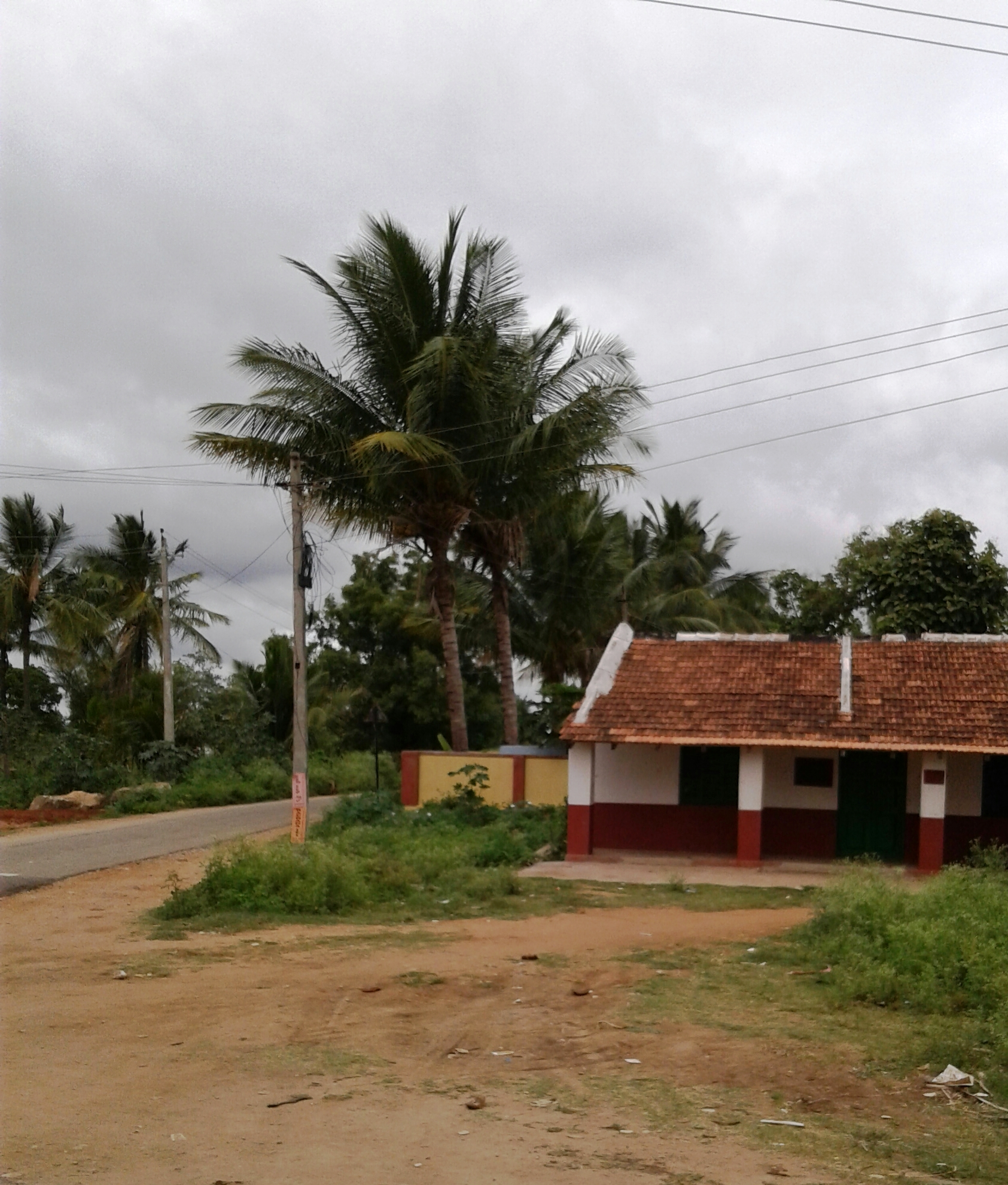
Mandalekanahalli

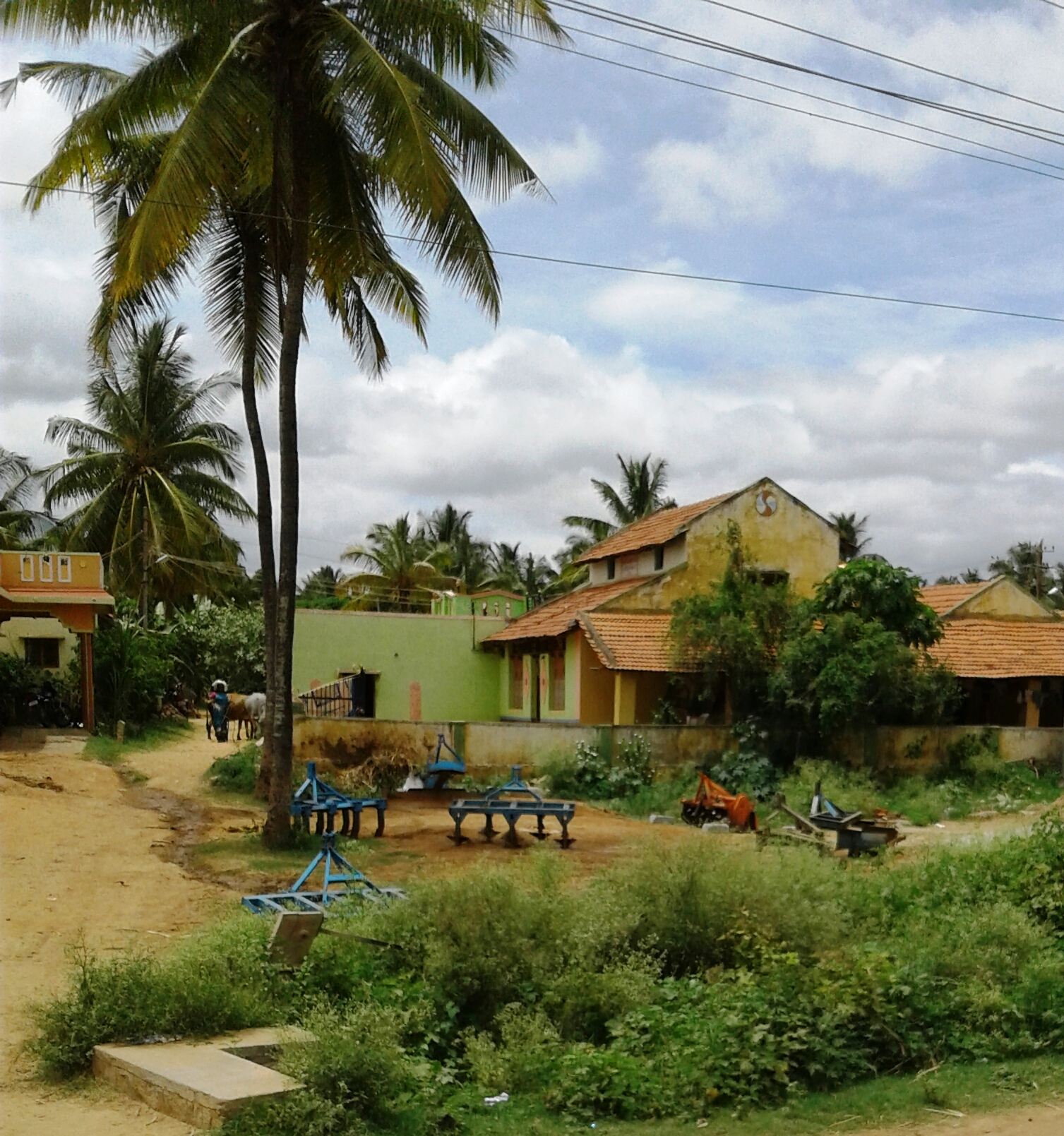
Anegola village
