= Mandagere =

Coordinates: 12.729571°N 76.379523°E

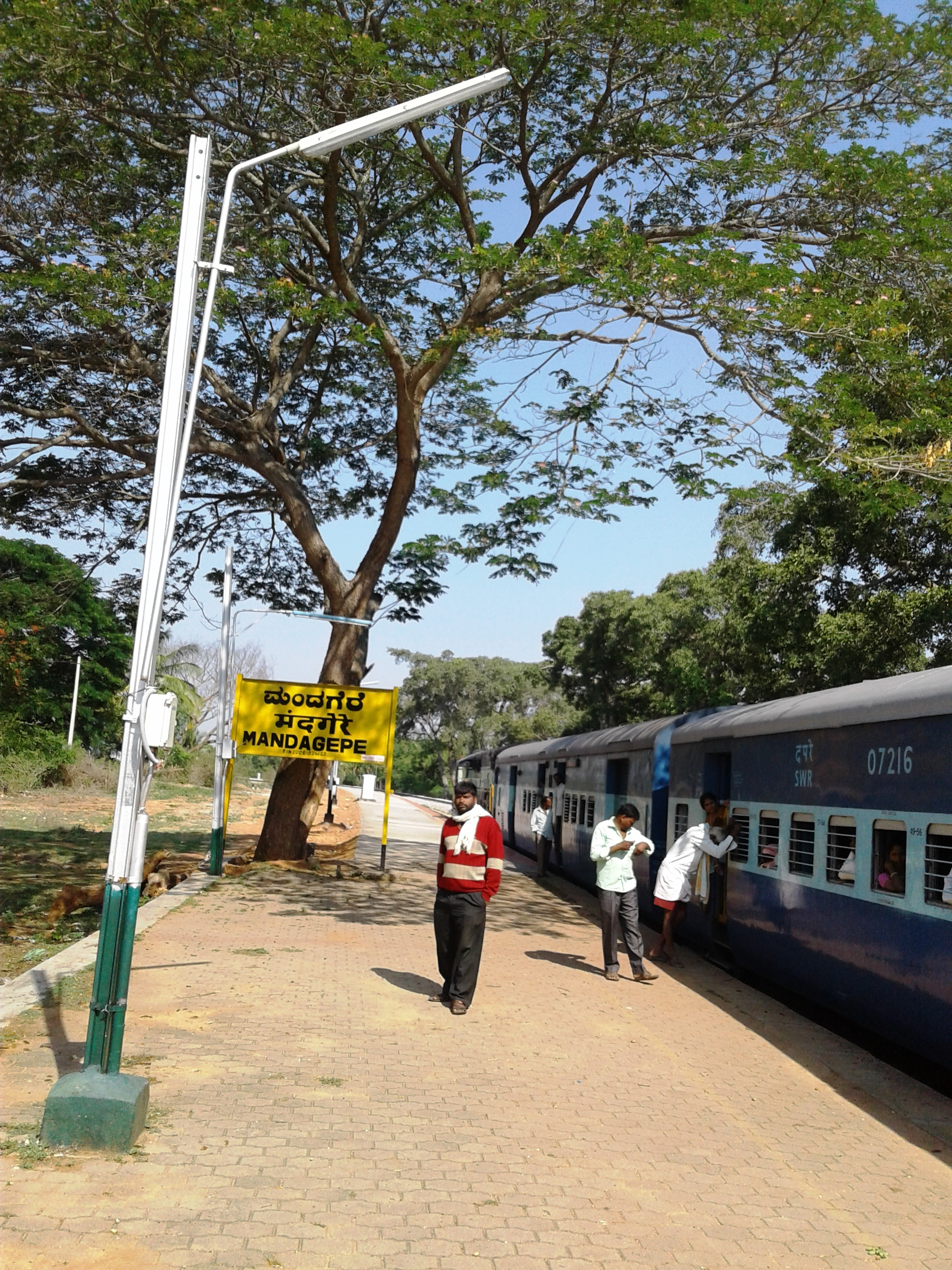
Train from Mysore

Mandagere is a small village in Mandya district of Karnataka state, India.

== Location ==
Mandagere is located on the road from Kikkeri to Holenarasipura.

== Transportation ==
Mandagere Railway Station is a station on the Mysore-Arasikere railway line. Only slow passenger trains stop at the station.

== See also ==
- Kikkeri
- Holenarasipura
- Dabbeghatta

== Image gallery ==
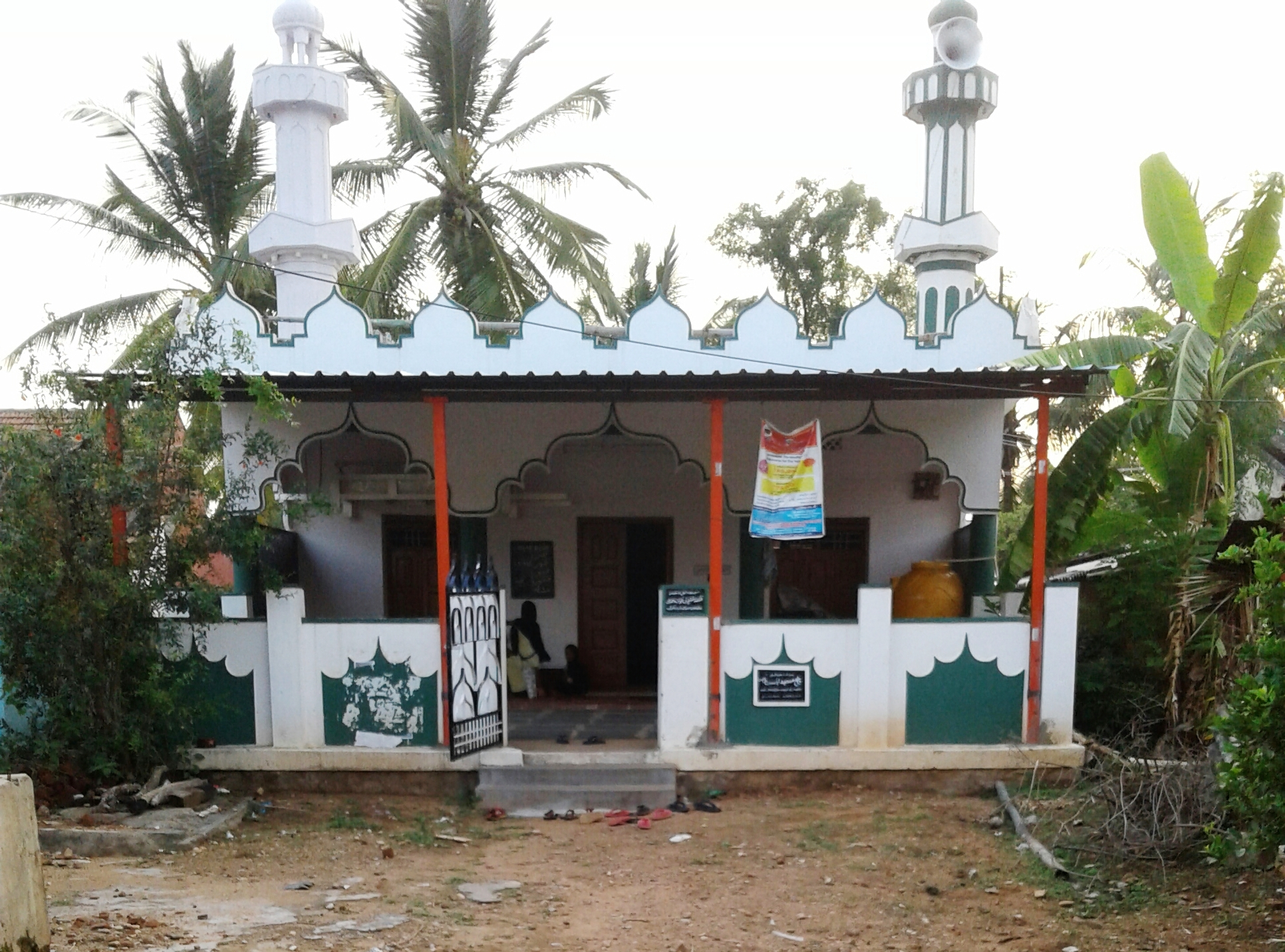
Mandagere Mosque

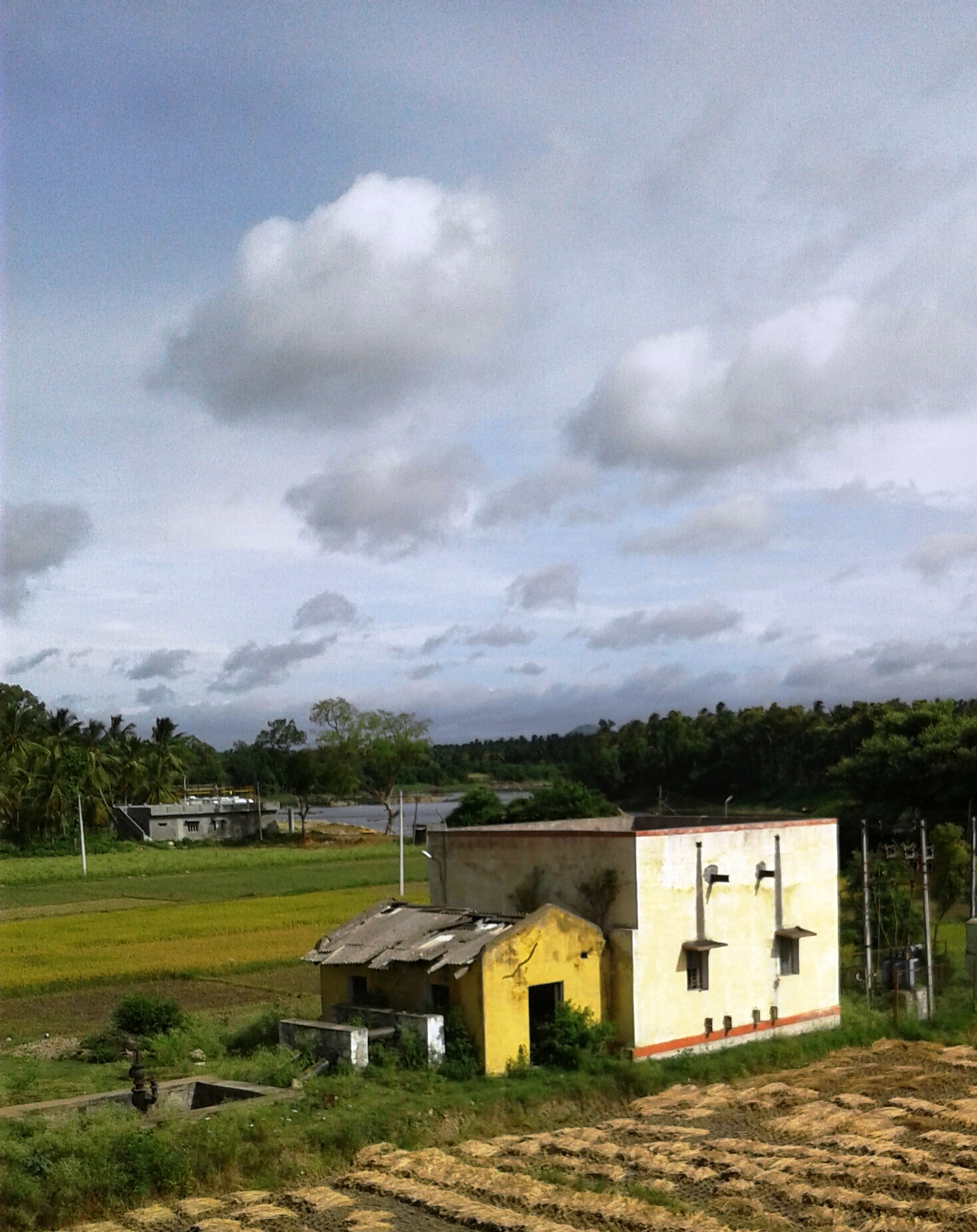
Mandagere Riverside

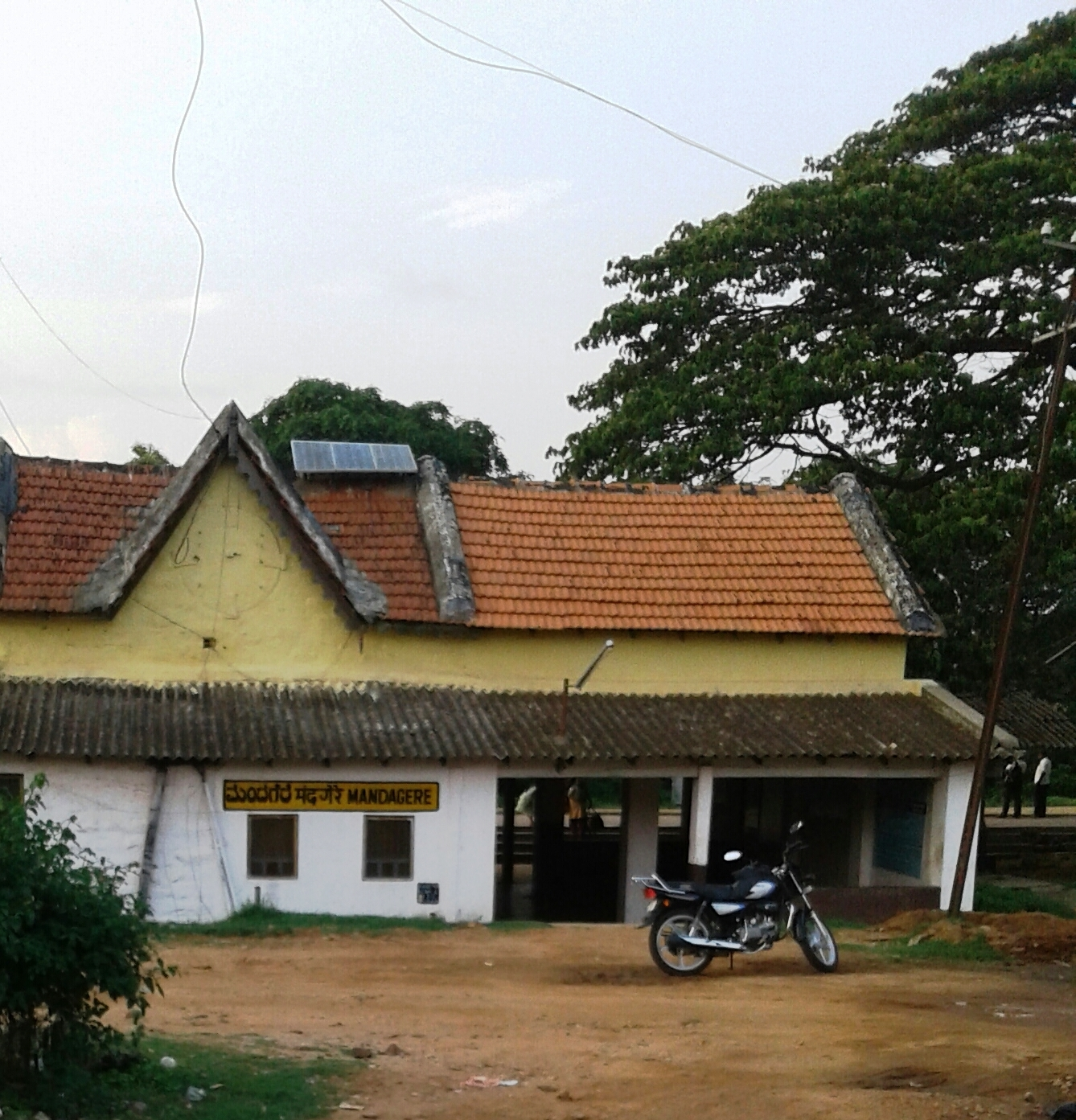
Mandagere Railway Station

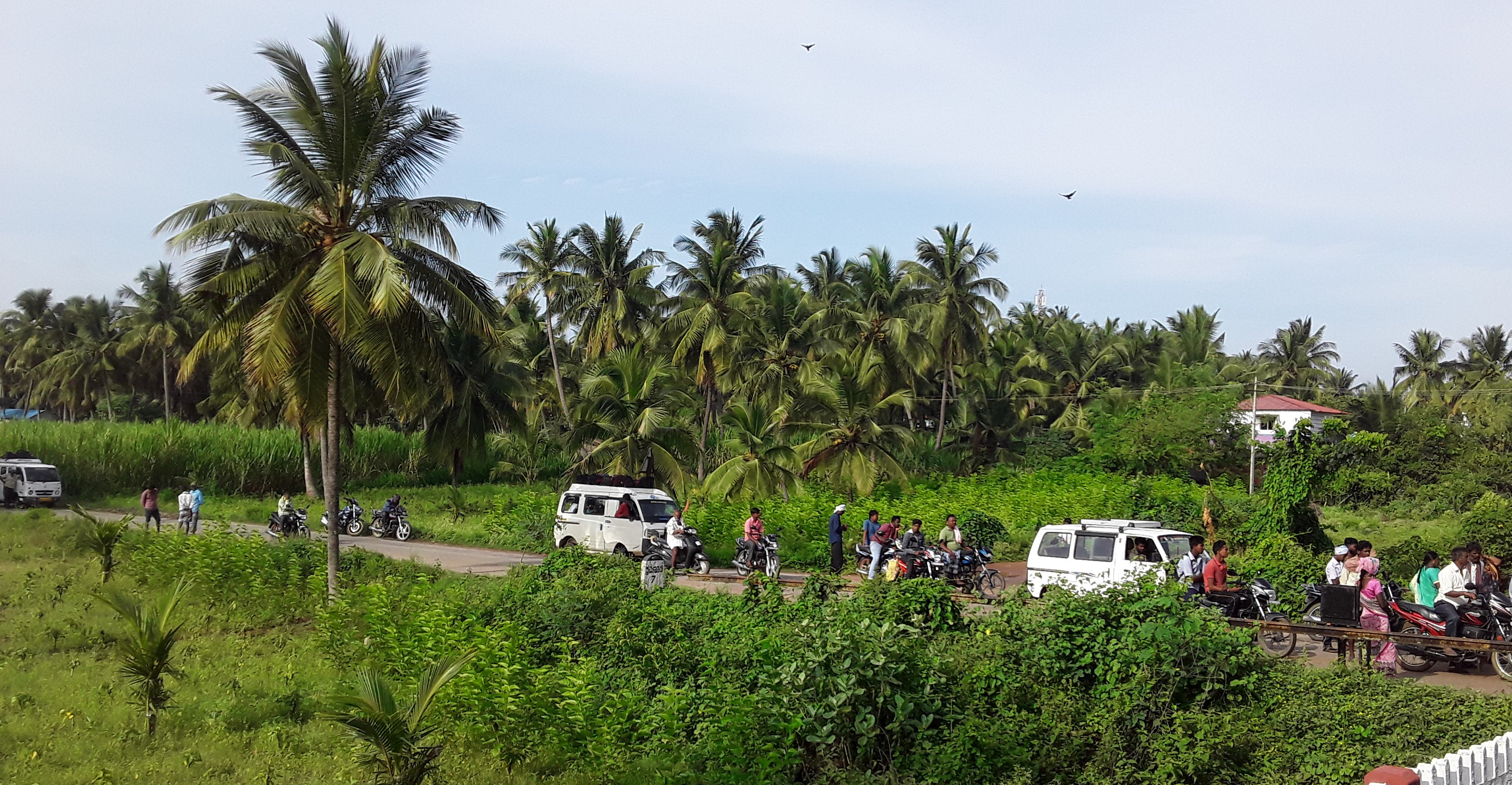
Mandagere Village
