= Brahmeshvara Temple, Kikkeri =

12th-century Hindu temple in Karnataka state, India

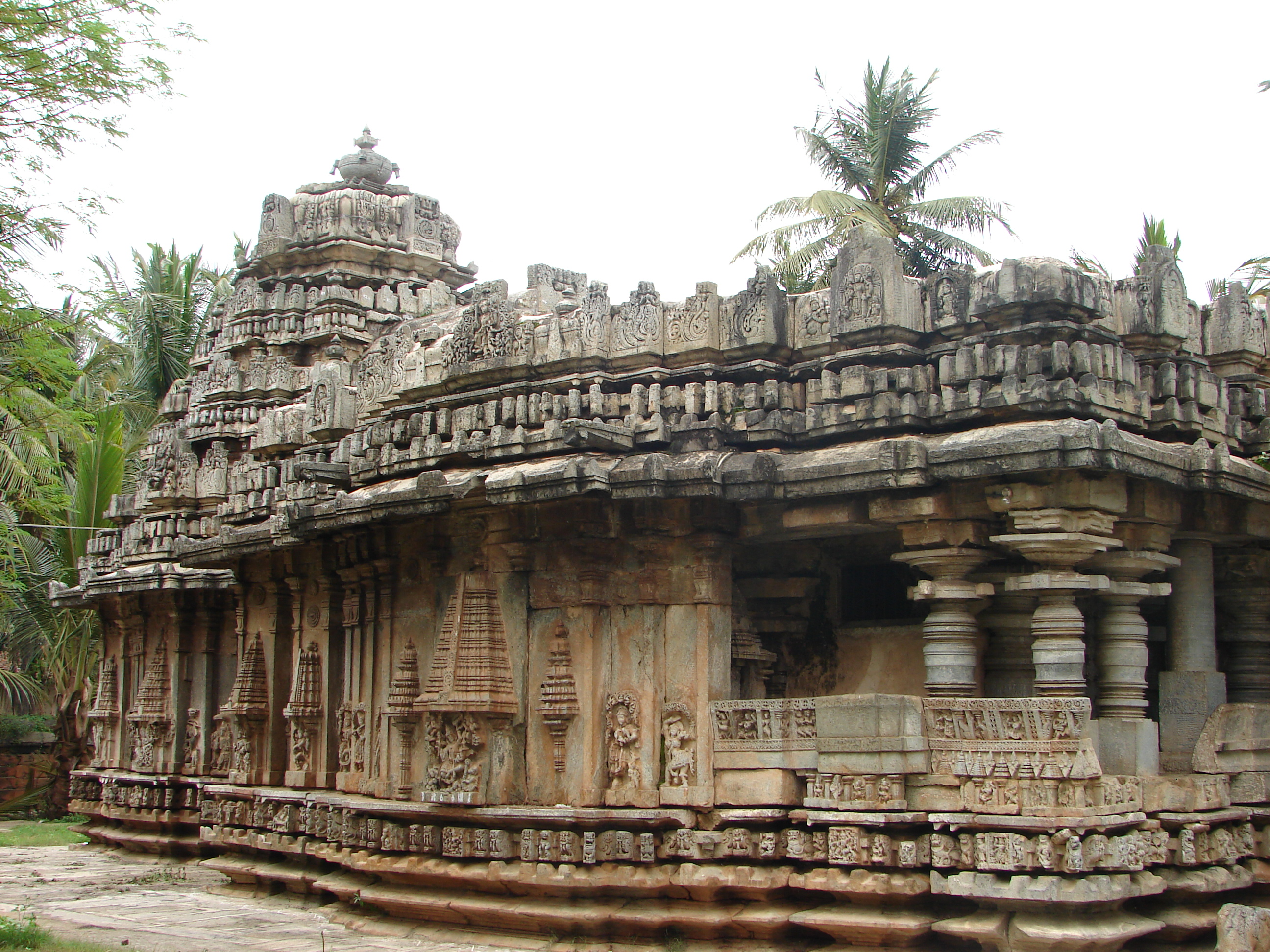
- A 12th-century Hoysala-style temple

- Location of temple in Karnataka Brahmeshvara Temple, Kikkeri (India)

Religion
- Affiliation: Hinduism
- Deity: Shiva

Location
- Location: Kikkeri, Mandya District, Karnataka, India
- Interactive map of Brahmeshvara Temple, Kikkeri
- Coordinates: 12°45′47.0″N 76°25′44.4″E

The Brahmeshvara temple, also referred to as the Brahmeshwara or Brahmesvara temple, is a 12th-century Hindu temple with Hoysala architecture in Kikkeri village, Mandya district of Karnataka state, India. Along with two other major historic temples within the village, the Brahmeshvara temple is one of many major ruined temples with notable artwork in Kikkeri area close to the more famous monuments of Shravanabelagola.

Dedicated to Shiva, the temple is notable for its integration of all major traditions of Hinduism – Shaivism, Vaishnavism and Shaktism, along with Vedic deities. (Note: Numerous large Hindu temples include iconography from all three traditions; the Brahmesvara temple belongs to the smaller subset of these that include all traditions inside and outside with similar emphasis. This may be because of the Chalukyan influence.) The east facing temple has several innovations in the Karnata-tradition of Hindu architecture, such as an ingenious mesa-makara-pattika, the bulging Navaranga mandapa, the sophisticated details in many statues and the classical Indian dance postures as sculpted inside the mandapa. On its outer walls are aedicules illustrating Hindu temple architecture from different parts of India – Nagara (north, west, east), Dravida (south), Vesara (Deccan), Bhumija (central, east) and composite forms. The carvings, state Dhaky and Meister, are of elaborate and high quality.

It was completed in 1171 AD by a woman named Bammave Nayakiti during the rule of Hoysala King Narasimha I. A significant portion of the artwork inside and outside temple is defaced, show signs of deliberate mutilation. Near the main temple, within the same complex is a Devi shrine with notable pilaster artwork. The Devi shrine was likely built a few decades later.

This temple is managed and protected by the Archaeology, Museums and Heritage department of the state of Karnataka (monument S-KA-543).

== Location ==
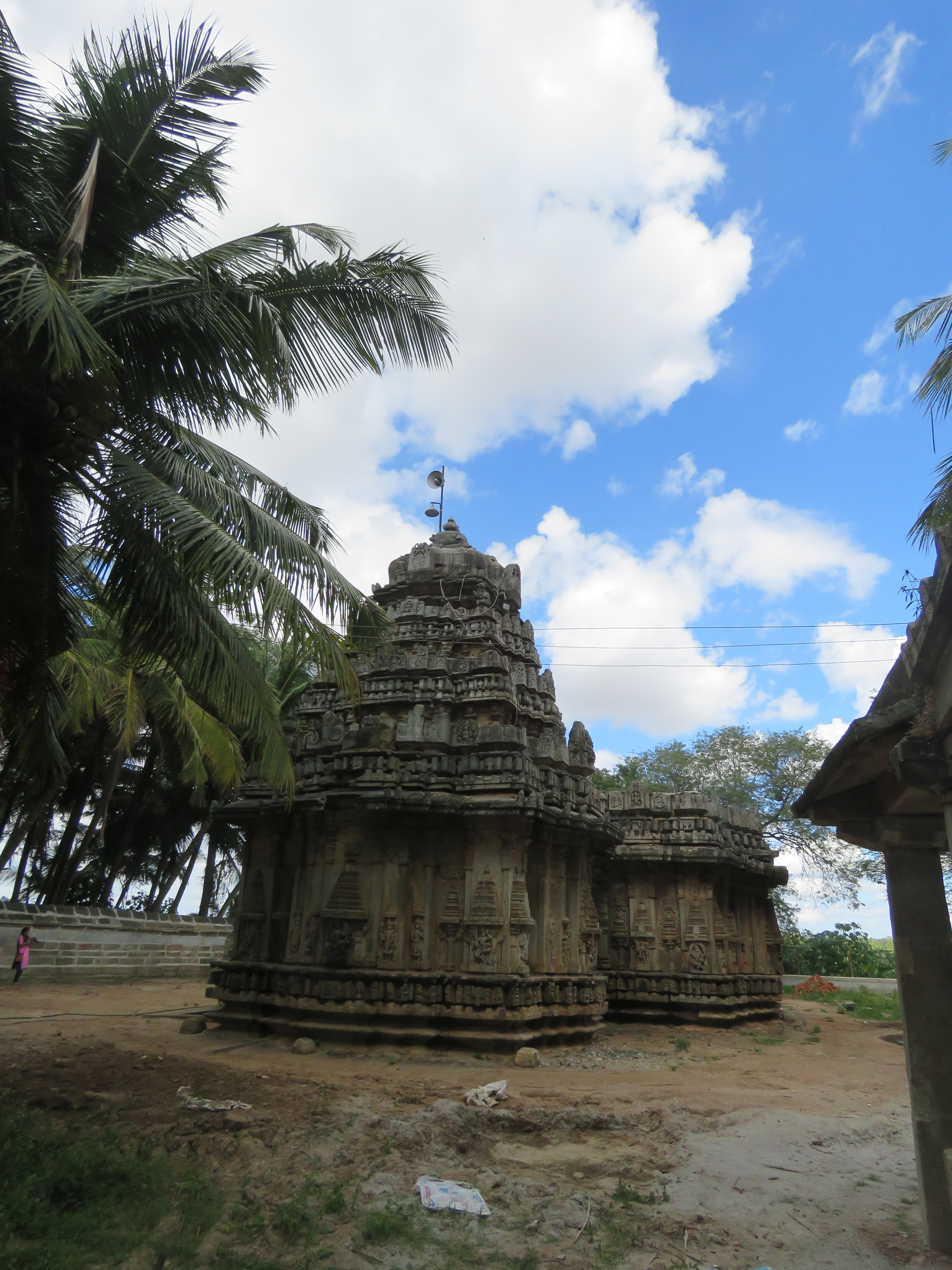
Brahmeshvara Temple compound overlooking the lake in distance.

Kikkeri is a large village with small-town like developed infrastructure in Krishnarajapet taluk. It is between the cities of Mysuru and Hassan on State Highway 7, about 15 kilometres (9.3 mi) southwest from Shravanabelagola which is known for its Digambara Jain monuments. To the east of Kikkeri is a historic man-made reservoir, now called the Kikkeri lake. Along the bank of this lake are the historic ruins of three major Hindu temples (Malleswara temple, Brahmeshvara temple and Janardhana temple). The village is also home to a historic Narasimha Hindu temple (Vaishnavism, Vishnu avatar) that is of a later date and also beautifully sculpted, a Devi temple called Kikkeramma (Shaktism, Durga iconography), and a Basavana temple (Lingyatism). The Brahmesvara temple is located towards the east-northeast side of the village, few hundred feet north of the more mutilated, smaller and neglected Hoysala temple dedicated to Janardhana.

== History ==
The authentic early history of Kikkeri before the 11th century is unknown. A local oral tradition states that there once lived a tribal chief named Keeka, whose tribe was a source of complaints to the king by people of the Shravanabelagola region. He was arrested. When presented before the king, Keeka offered the king "vast treasures" in exchange for a village named after him, with a temple, water tank and a fort where they can all settle down. The king accepted his terms, and the village built came to be known as Kikkeri every since. The temple Keeka asked for was the Malleswara temple, completed in late 11th to early 12th century. This was dedicated to Brahmesvara (Shiva). Over time, the foundations of the Malleswara temple became constantly water logged. So, in the 12th century a woman named Bammave Nayakiti built the more spectacular Brahmesvara temple, where the deity was re-consecrated. A number of inscriptions have been discovered in this village and at the temples, but none authenticate this story. However, these inscriptions confirm that the Malleswara temple with a 16-pillar mandapa and a closed hall is the oldest temple in Kikkeri, and that it has been water logged.

Inscriptions in the 11th century (saka 1017) mention gifts to Brahmesvara in Kikkeri by Hoysala kings who proclaim themselves to be from Yadava-kula and ruling over Ganga-mandala.

The existence of several major historic temples in Kikkeri suggests it was an important prosperous town in pre-14th century Karnataka. This is further corroborated by many more major, intricately carved historic Hindu and Jain temples found within about 15 kilometers of Kikkeri, as well as the numerous inscriptions discovered in this region. Example pre-14th century temples and monuments include those found in Shravanabelagola, Govindanhalli, Hosaholalu and Sasalu.

== Architecture ==
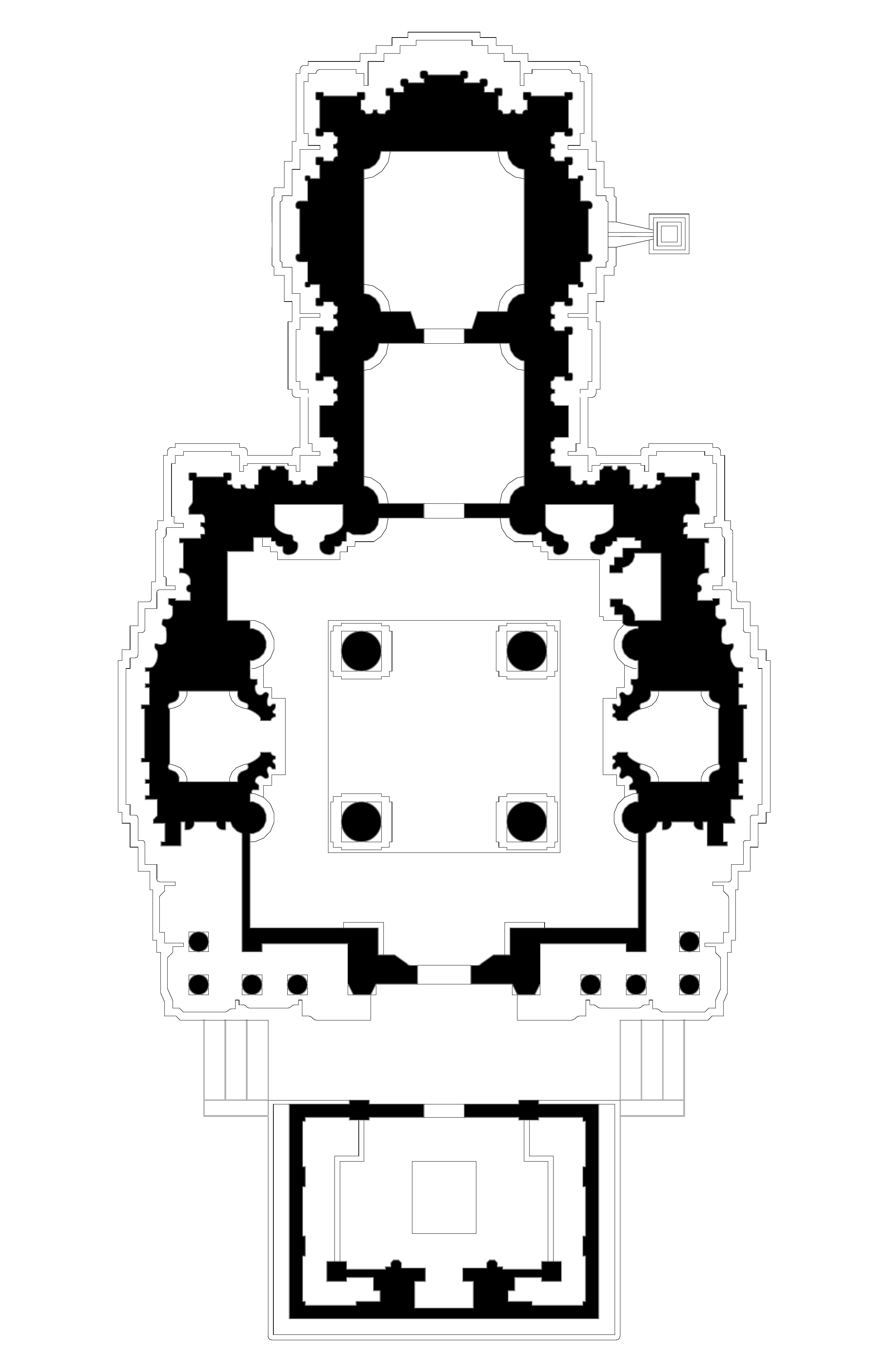
The floor plan of the Brahmesvara temple, Kikkeri Karnataka

The Brahmeshvara temple in within a compound along with a much smaller Devi shrine. It has one sanctum (ekakuta) and it faces east. Unlike other large Hoysala temples which stand on a jagati (platform), this temple is directly set on the ground. It has two entrances, facing each other, from north and south (see attached floor plan). On one side after these entrances is the Nandi-mandapa with Shiva's vahana. The other side enters into Navaranga mandapa (pilgrim's gathering hall), connecting to an antarala (ante-chamber, vestibule), followed by the Garbhagrihya (sanctum, cella). The architecture of each of these sections follow the square and circle principles of Hindu architecture.

Vimana

The vimana superstructure is tritala (three-storeyed). It is integrated with the sukhanasi above the antarala as a low protrusion of the tower over the shrine. The temple has the largest amalaka in a Hoysala temple (called the "helmet") and whose shape usually follows that of the shrine (square or star shape); the kalasa on top of it (the decorative water-pot at the apex of the dome); and the Hoysala crest (emblem of the Hoysala warrior slaying a lion) over the sukhanasi. The Vimana is 22 feet wide.

The kapotabandha adhisthana of the vimana, state Dhaky and Meister, has an ingenious and elaborately carved mesa-makara-pattika. Above the kuta-stambhas and recesses show a remarkable display of major Hindu architectural styles celebrating temple styles found in different parts of India, namely Nagara, Dravida, Vesara, Bhumija and composite forms. The toranas too show variations as if the temple walls are depicting illustrations in a text book on architecture. In the niches of the Vimana, similarly, are reliefs from all major Hindu traditions. For example, there is Nataraja, Dakshinamurti and Ardhanarishvara (half Shiva, half Parvati) of Shaivism; then avatars of Vishnu and Krishna-lila of Vaishnavism; Durga, Lakshmi, Saraswati and Chandi of Shaktism; Brahma, Surya, Chandra of Vedic pantheon; as well composites such as Harihara (half Shiva, half Vishnu). While numerous historic Hindu temples all over India include all three traditions, the Brahmesvara temple at Kikkeri is notable for its balance and details in the artwork. The talas above in the superstructure is relatively simpler. They are well executed, highly decorative and intact tower (shikhara).

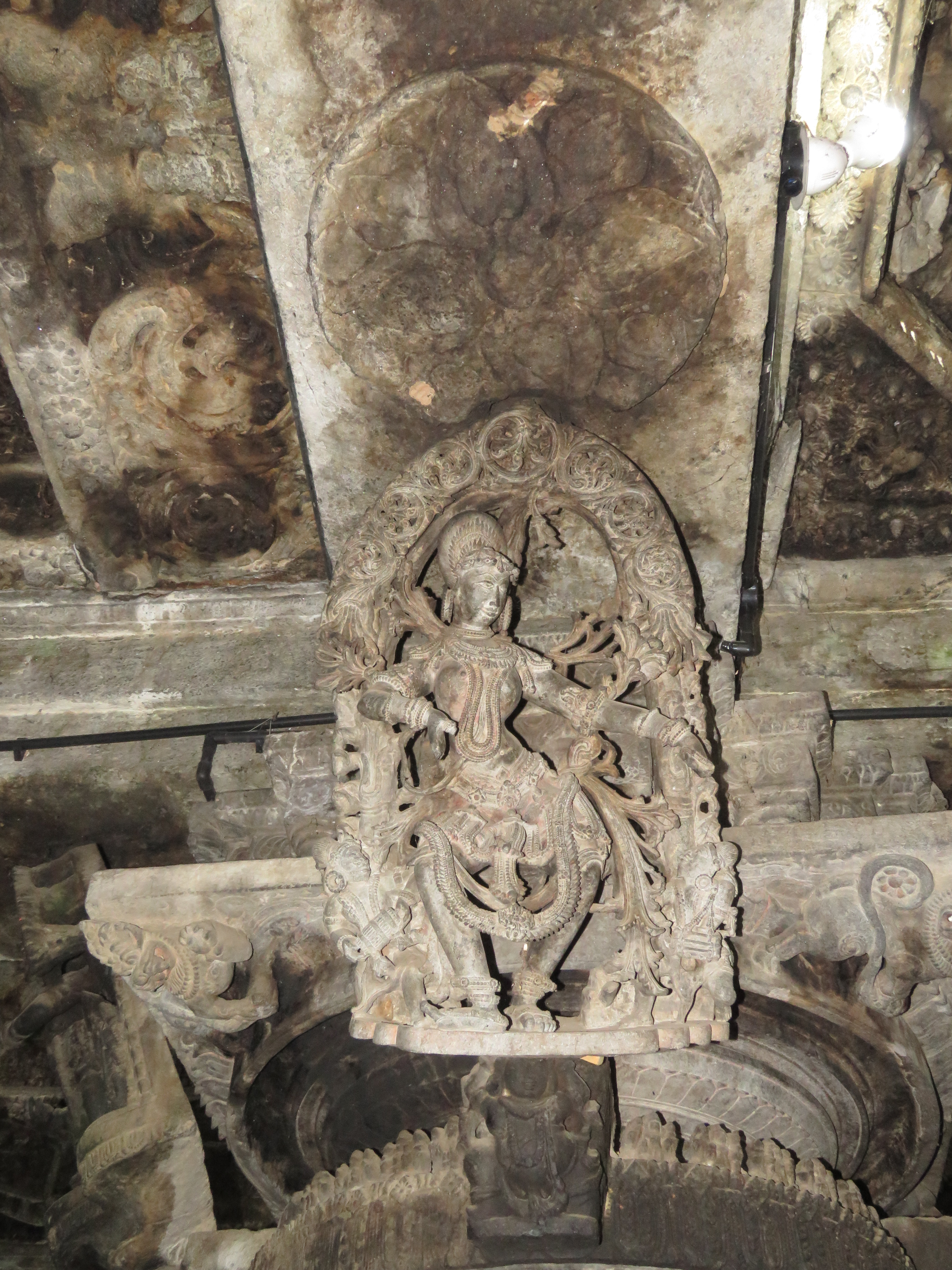
Putrika brackets showing classical dance postures.

Mandapa

The navaranga-mandapa bulges out of its base, giving the temple a convex shape. This fuses a 40-foot-wide gudha-type hall architecture with an rangamandapa-like opening in the front. The architect achieved this by innovatively omitting the upabhadras. The mandapa has four large Srikara-type pillars with putrika type brackets (5 of 16 are broken, others partly mutilated). These girls are elegantly shaped and are modeling South Indian classical dance postures, in a manner that reminds of the salabhanjikas in the Hindu temple at Belur. (Note: This bulge is a Vesara-architecture related innovation of about the 11th-century by the Sudi and Lakkundi schools of Hindu architecture in north Karnataka.)

The ceiling of the mandapa has nine panels. Eight show dikpalas (directional deities), while the central one show a samatala with nine planets in framed boxes – uncommon in temples of Karnataka. There is a smaller Nandi inside the navaranga-mandapa.

Inner artwork

Inside the main mandapa are niches with statues of Shaivism, Vaishnavism and Shaktism. These include:

- Ganesha in the west side khattaka niche flanking the vestibule
- Durga in the west side niche
- Kartikeya (Skanda, Murugan) in the southern side niche flanking the vestibule
- A four feet Shiva and a four feet Vishnu in larger bhadra niches of the navaranga mandapa
- A jeweled Nandi in the Nandi mandapa on the east side of the temple
- Surya near the Nandi, for whom the Nandi mandapa has been stretched (this section of the temple is more damaged, and has been restored with bricks in the modern era)

Some niches are empty, some removed and gifted or sold to major museums of the world during the colonial era. The Keshava image in display at New York's Metropolitan Museum of Art likely came from this temple.

Devi shrine

Completed a bit later than the main temple, in the early 13th century, the intricately cut wall pilasters in this small shrine are notable.

Inscriptions

The temple has fifteen inscriptions in different places (Sanskrit, Kannada), which helps date this temple and suggests the socio-political significance of this temple over 12th to 14th century. Some of these are partly or mostly damaged. The important surviving ones include:

- Foundation inscription on the stone standing to the east of the temple and north of Nandi-mandapa, dated to saka 1093 (1171 CE).
- An older incomplete inscription near the prakara (compound wall) dated to 1134 CE
- A slab on the southern side mentions Shiva and Parvati came to Kikkeri from Kailasha in the Himalayas
- King's inscription: a pillar near the Nandi mentions that the king Narasimhadeva living in capital Dorasamudra made a gift to this temple for a perpetual lamp

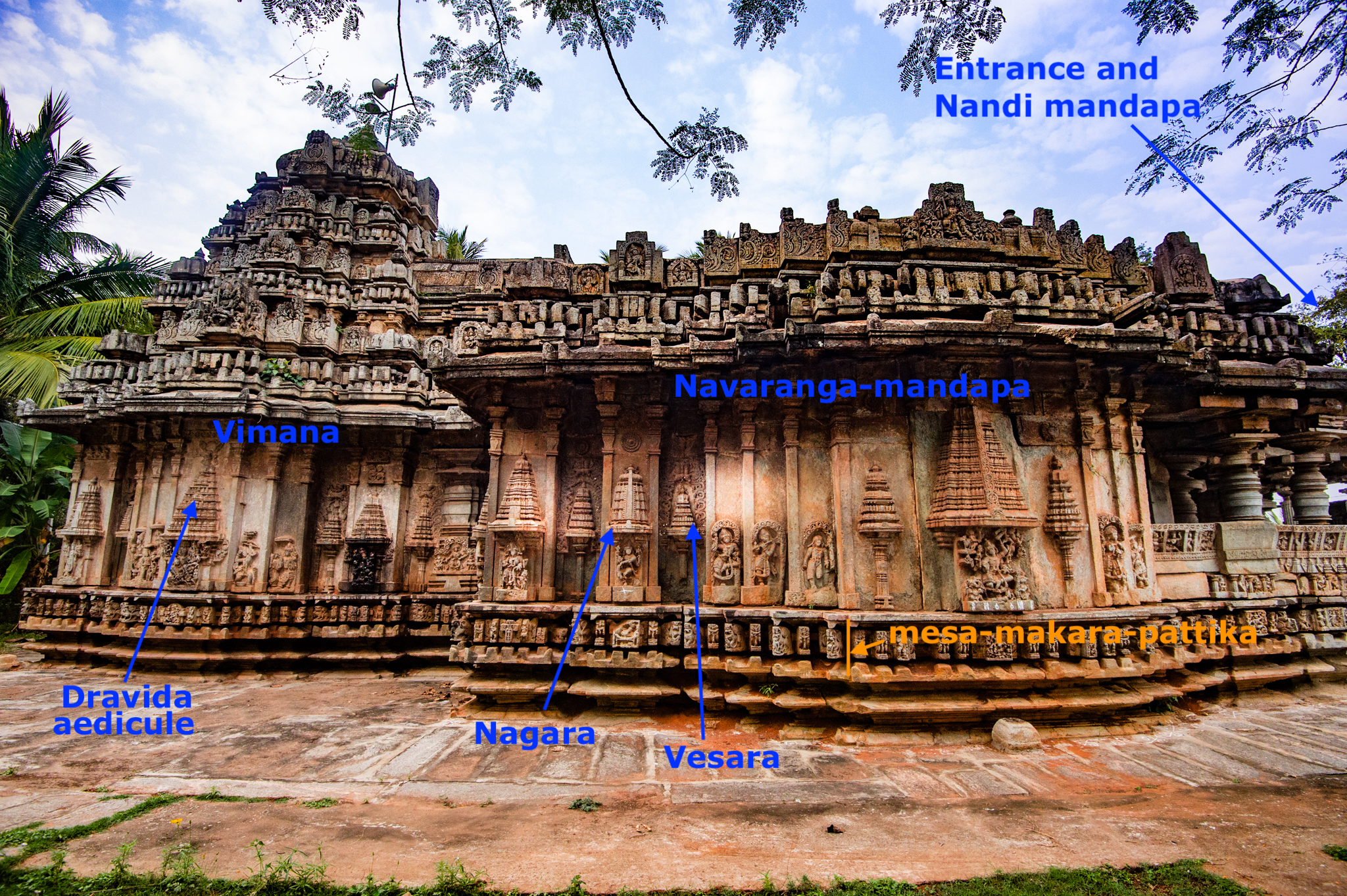

== Nearby monuments ==
Within 5 to 15 kilometers of this temple are the following major sites:

- Shravanabelagola – one of the most important heritage sites of the Digamabara tradition of Jainism
- Panchalingesvara Temple, Govindanahalli – a major temple with five sanctums, early 13th century
- Gopalaswamy temple, Govindanahalli – a smaller, less decorated temple, in neglect, 13th century
- Hunaseshwara Temple, Agrahara Bachahalli (Unasheshwara Swami) temple – a large temple with major stambhas with mounted elephants and many hero stones, early 13th century
- Lakshminarayana Temple, Hosaholalu – a Vishnu temple, ornate Chalukya temple
- Malleswara Temple, Aghalaya – A Shiva three-sanctum temple, simple outside and more ornate inside, Hoysala style

== Gallery ==
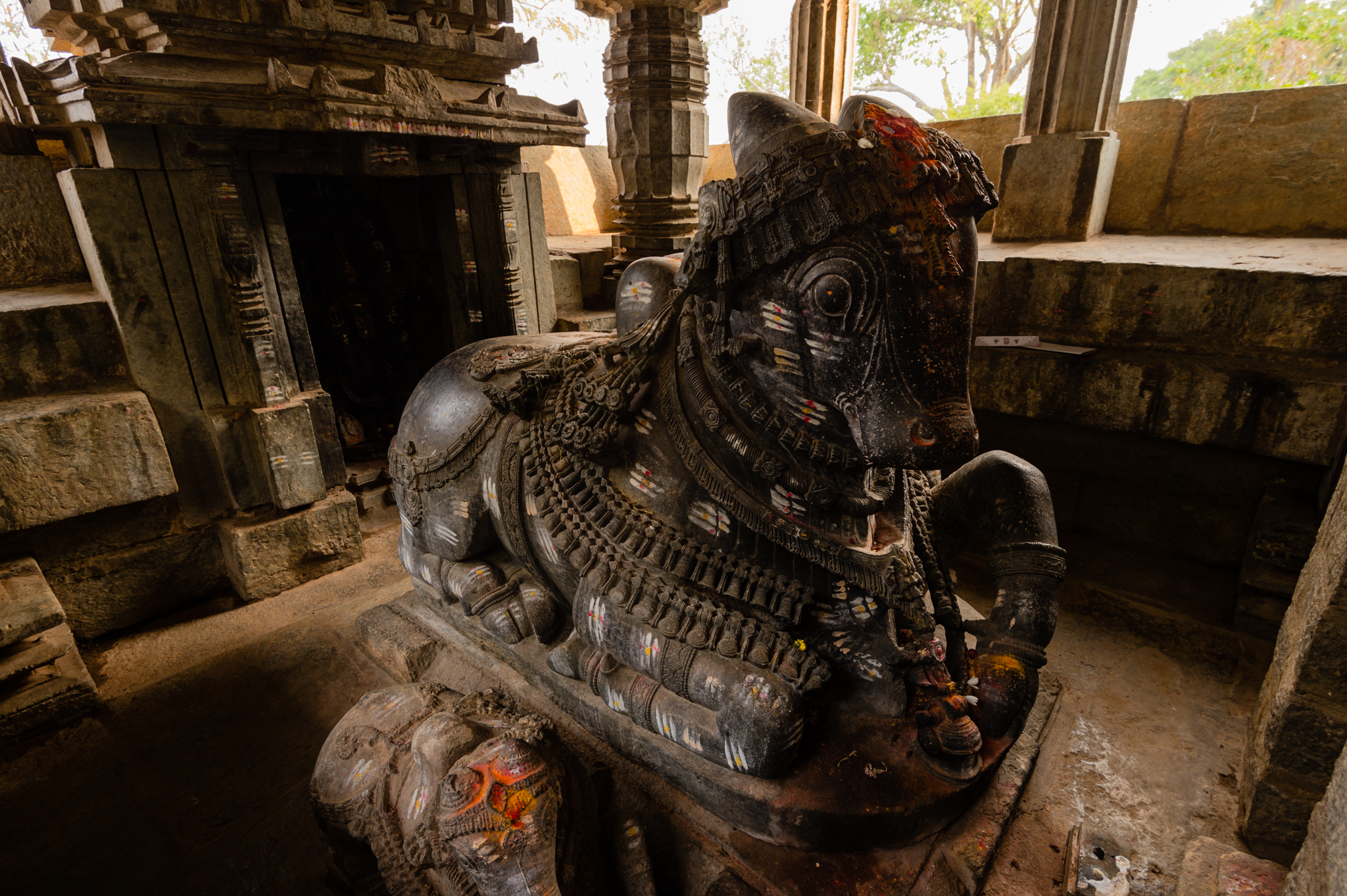
Nandi bull facing the sanctum, in the back is the Surya niche

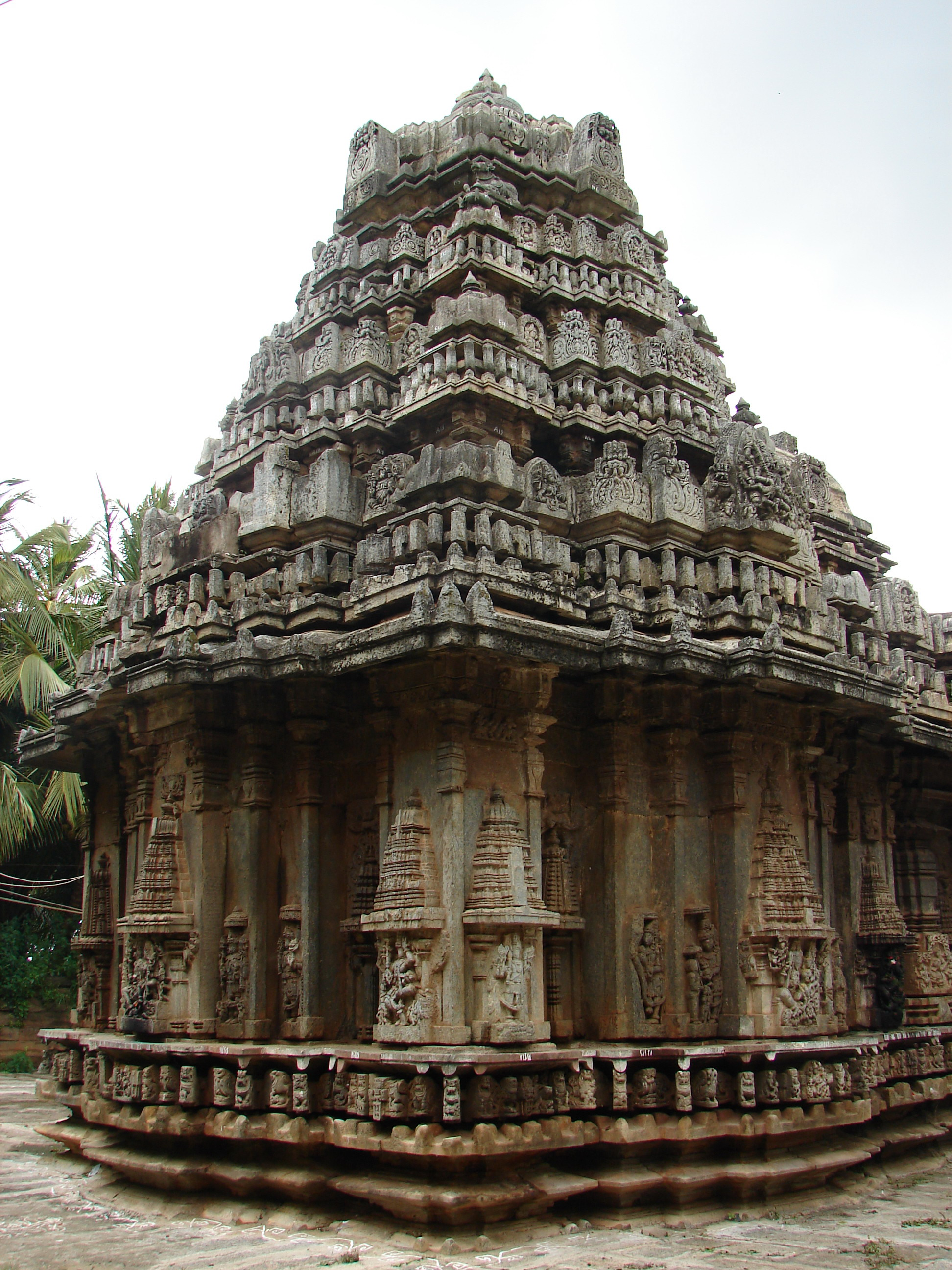
Stellate layout of the shrine in Brahmeshvara temple at Kikkeri

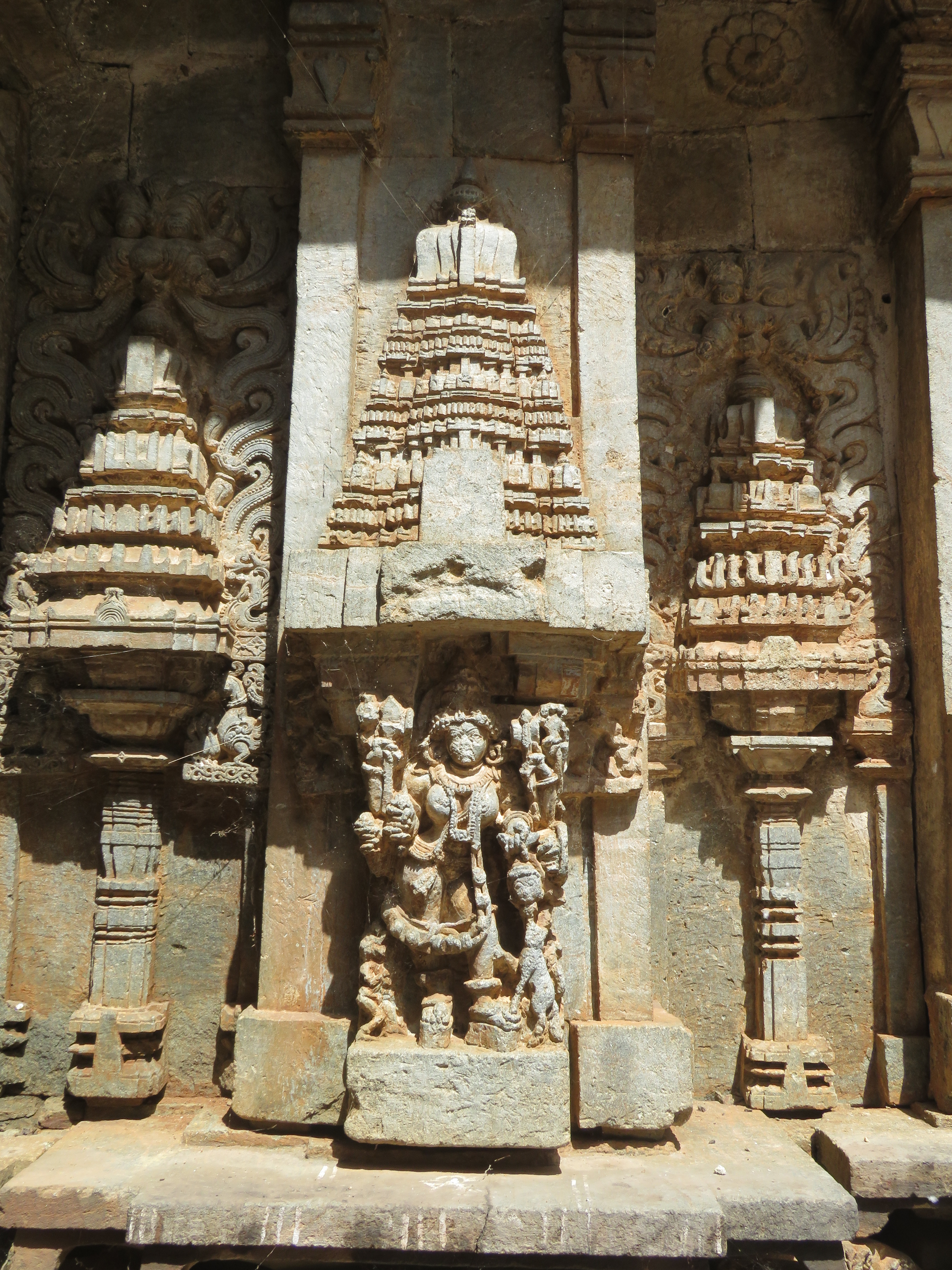
Aedicules (shikhara design) show a variety of Hindu architecture

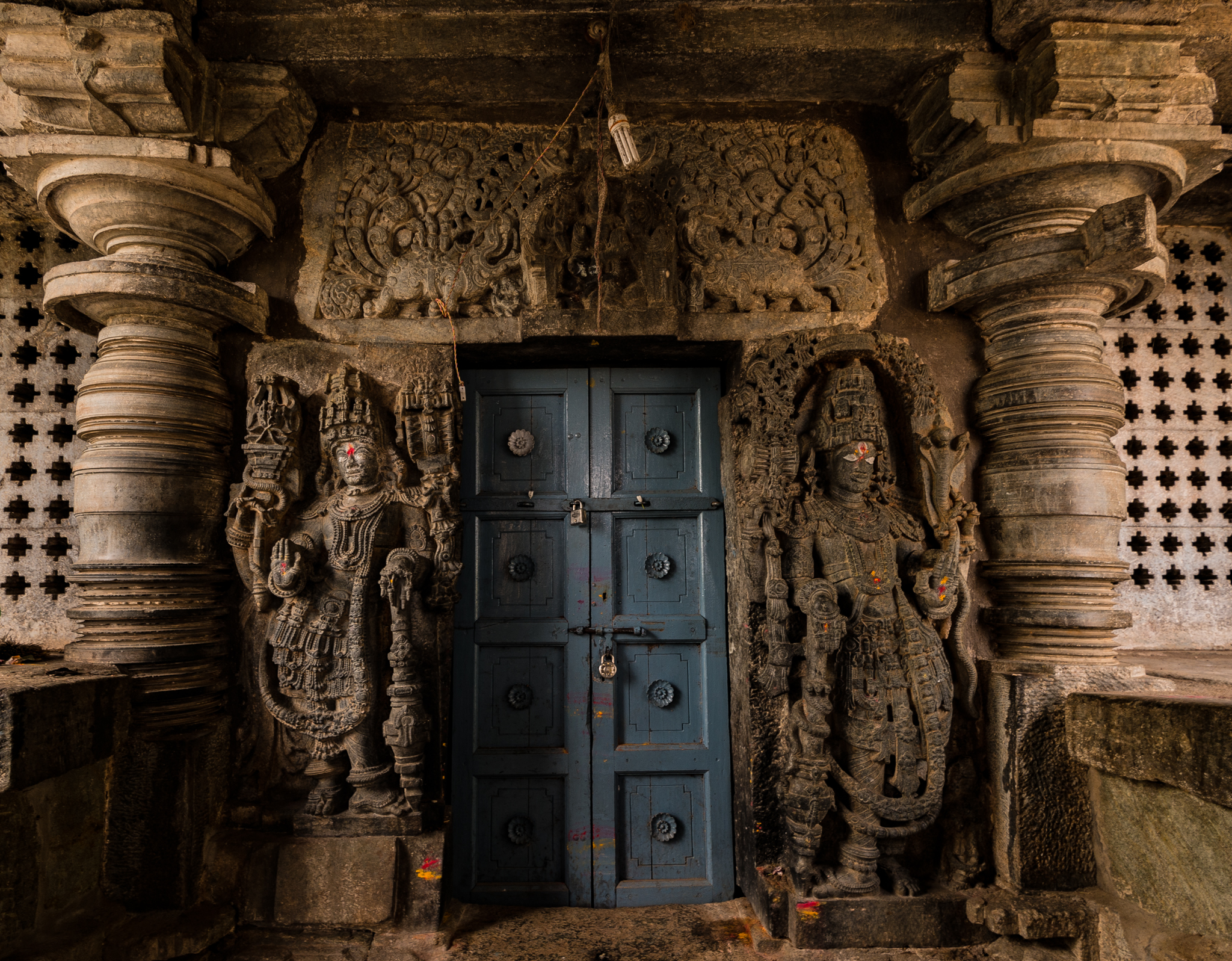
Dvarapalas

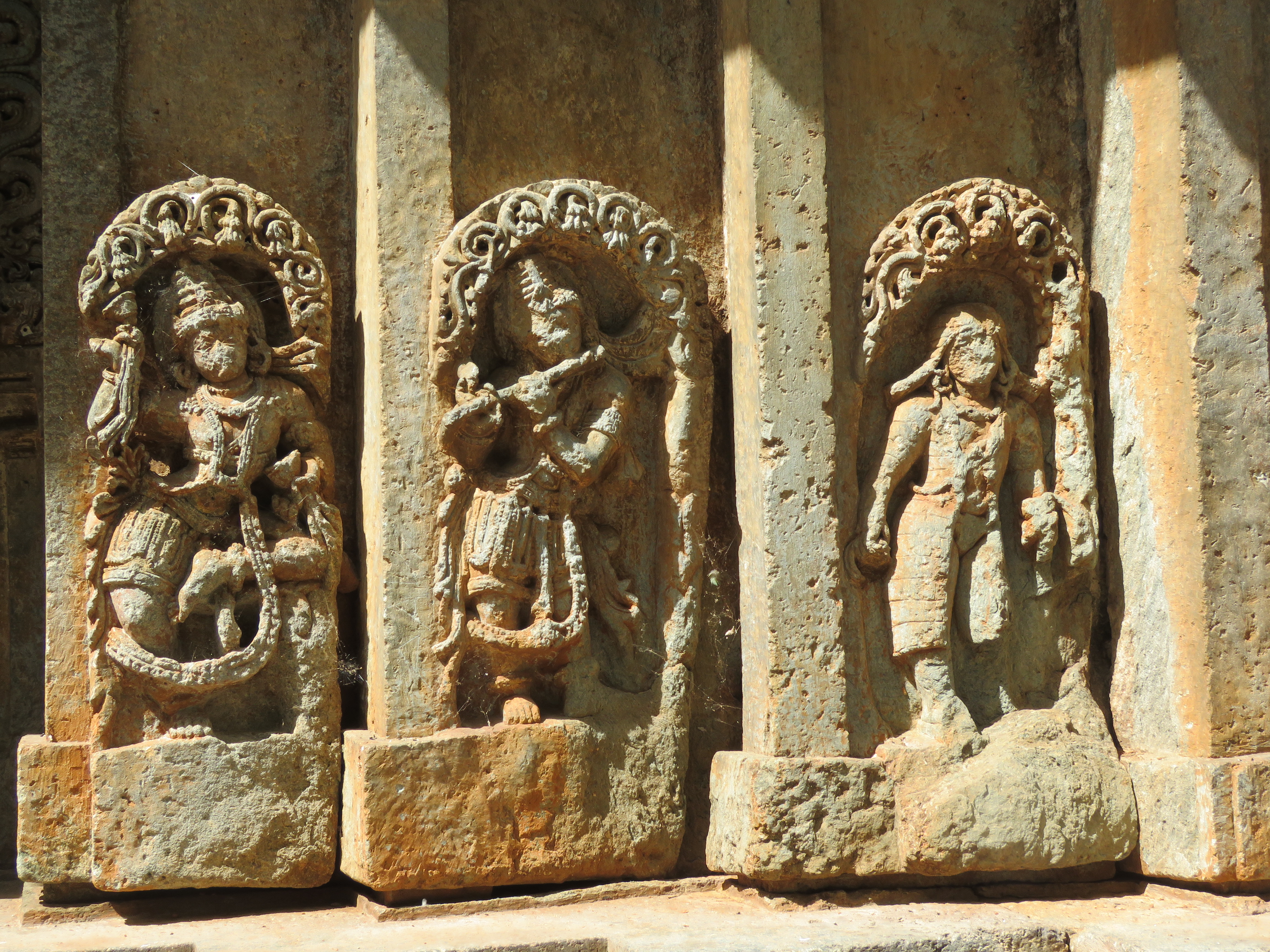
Defaced reliefs on the outer wall, Krishna in the center

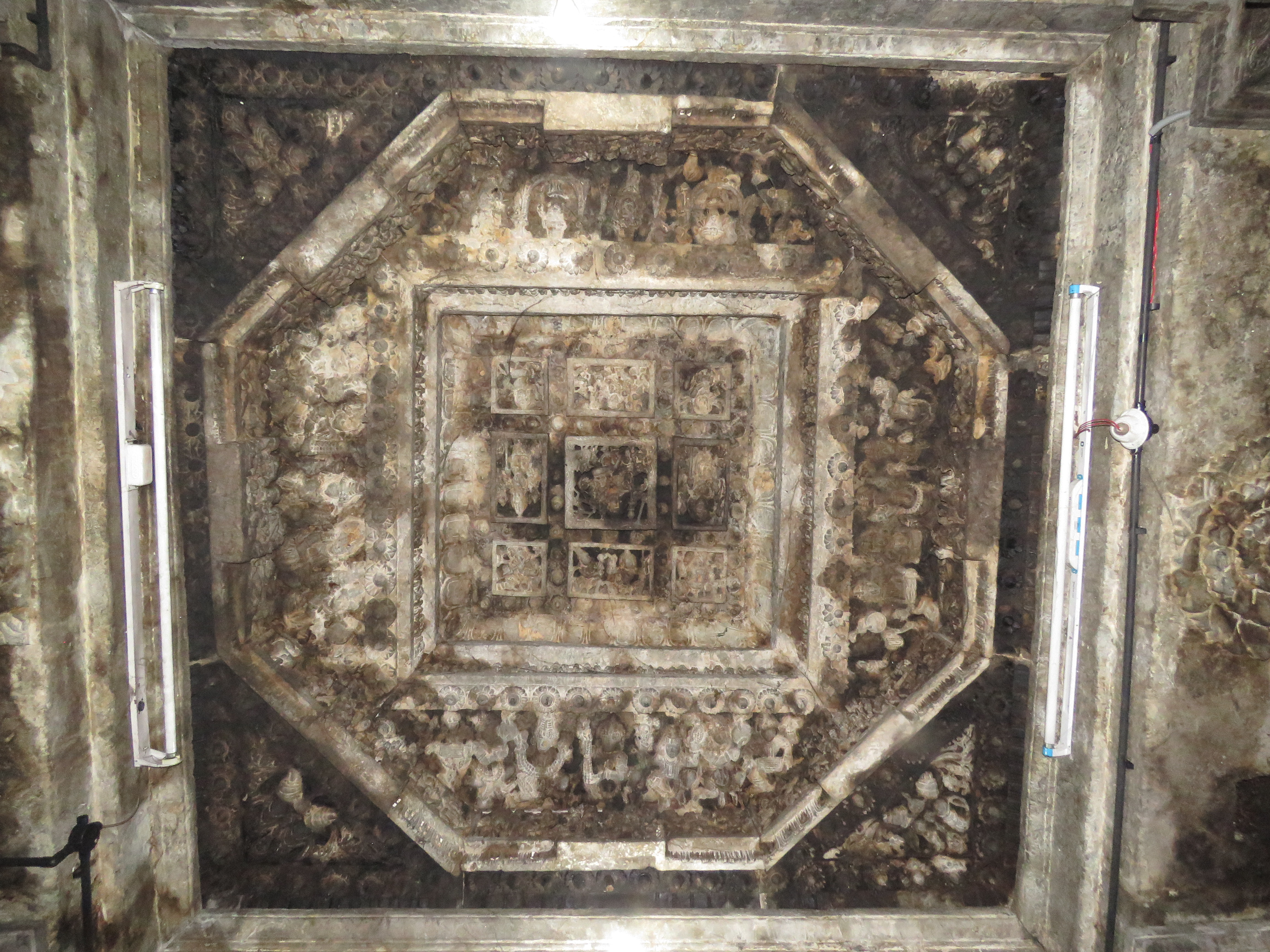
Central panel in the ceiling, navagraha

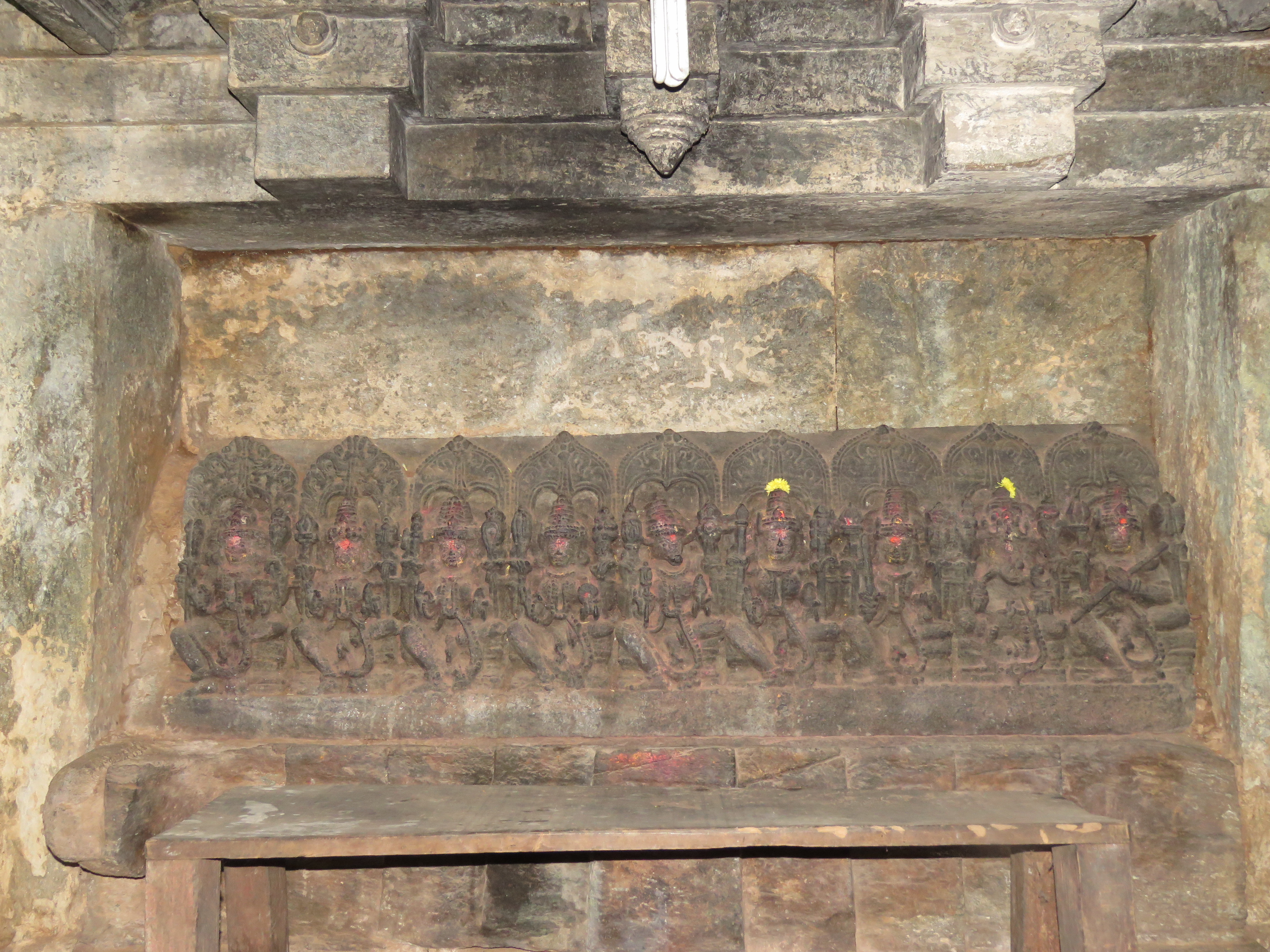
Saptramatrika (mother goddesses)

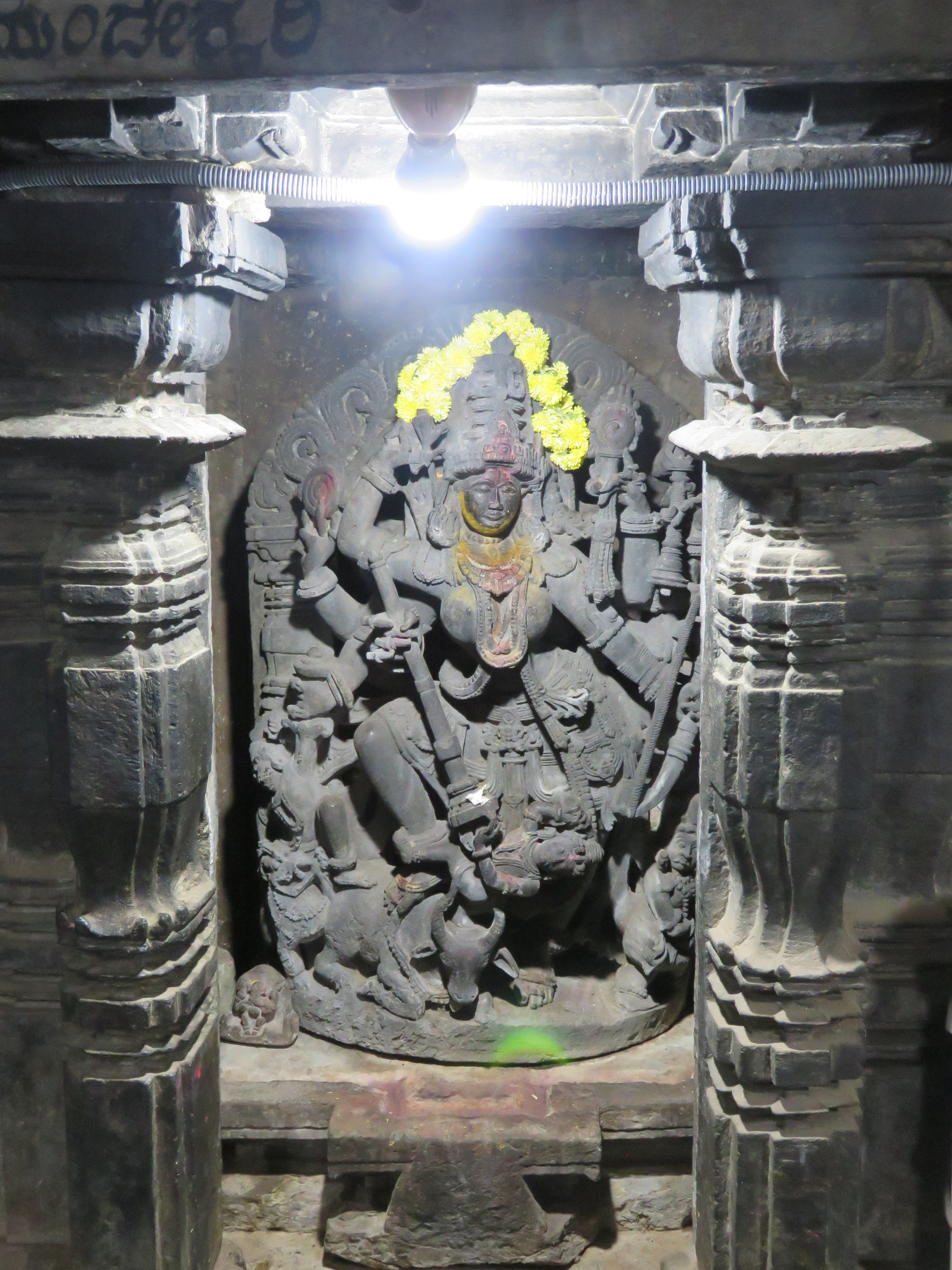
Mahisasuramardini (Durga)

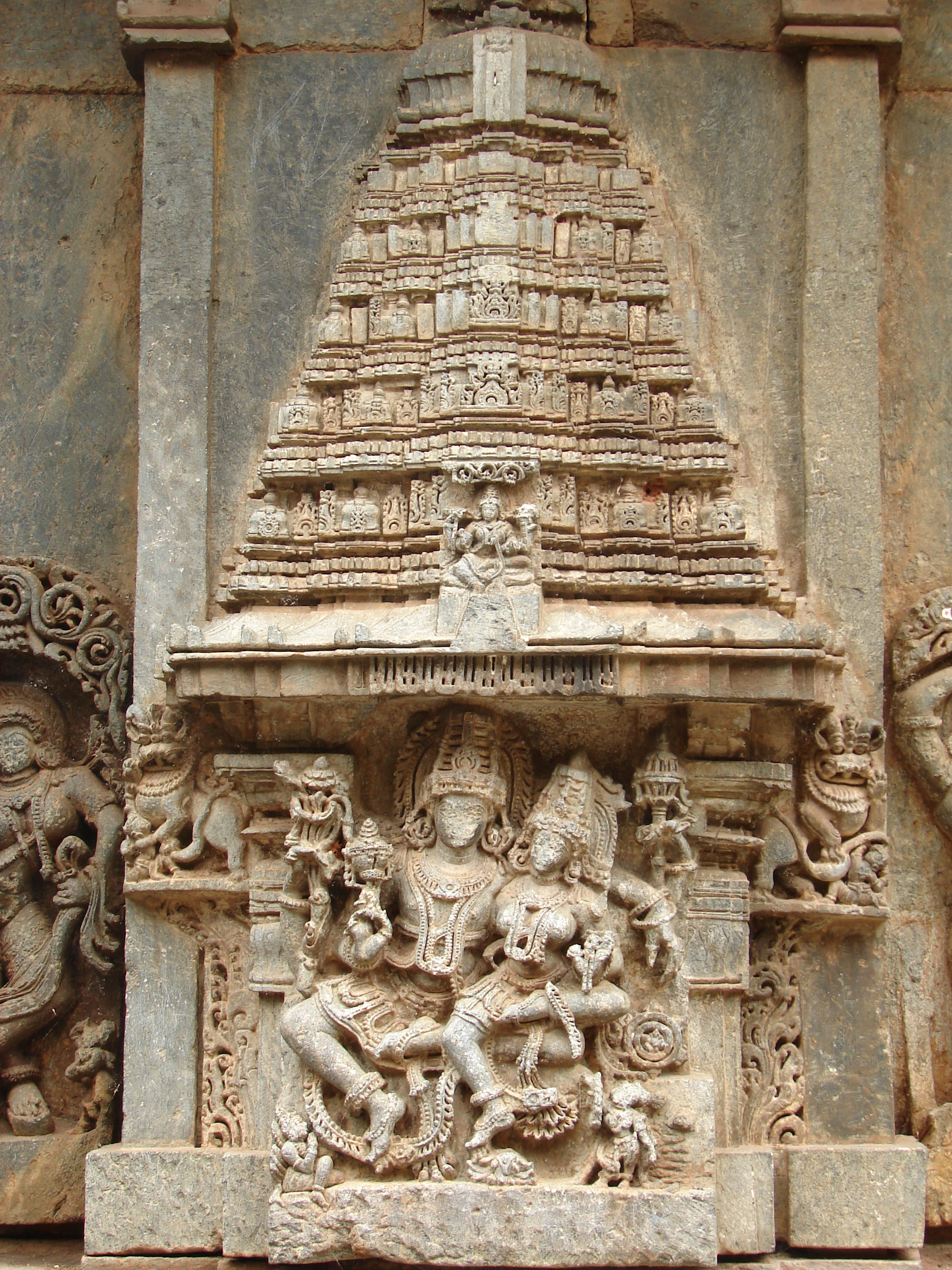
Vishnu and Lakshmi under a Vesara aedicule

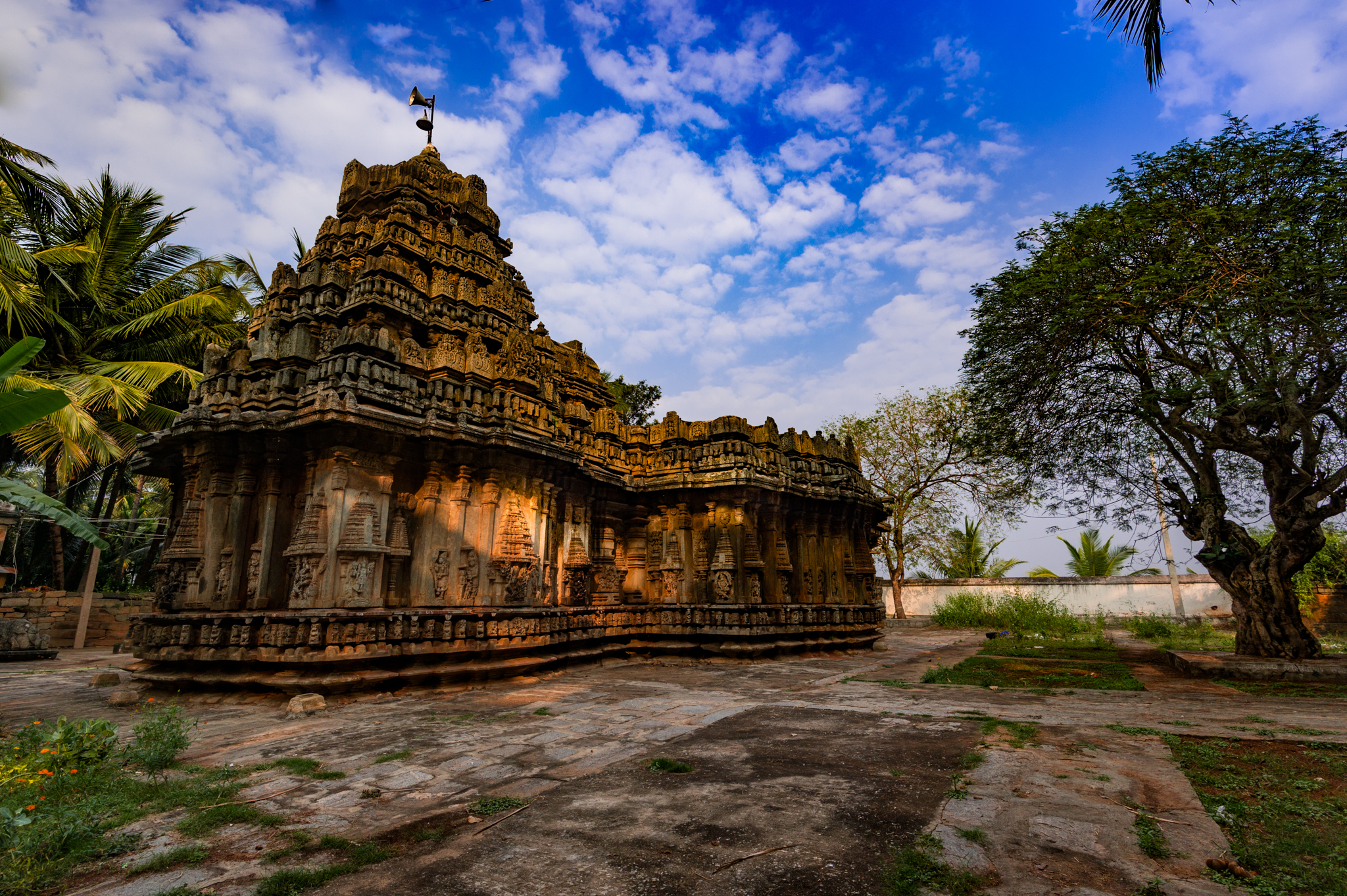
The Brahmeshvara temple - SouthSide View
