= Sasalu, Mandya =

Coordinates: 12.805555°N 76.447635°E

Sasalu is a village in Mandya district, Karnataka, India.

== Location ==
Sasalu location

shree shambulingeshwara and Shree someshwara temple location

Shree Kuduremandamma Temple, Sasalu

Sasalu rode location

== Demographics ==
Sasalu has a population of 1,310 people, according to the 2011 census. There are 285 households in the village. The total area of the village is 304 hectares.

== PIN code ==
There is a post office in the village and the postal code is 571423.

== Major Attractions ==
There are two Shiva temples in Sasalu: Someshwara Temple and Shambhulingeshwara Temple. The Someshwara Temple is at the center of the village, whereas the Shambhulingeshwara Temple is situated around 1 km towards the eastern side of the village. The walkway amidst greenery to the second temple is an experience in itself. There is a school near the second temple. The whole locality is very silent and photogenic.

Other temples in the village include Shree Kuduremandamma Temple, Shree Bairarajeshwar Temple, Shree Basaveshwara Temple, Shree Maramma temple, Shree Kailasa Basava Temple and Shree Singamma Temple.

== Economy ==
The village has an agrarian economy. There is a branch of Vijaya Bank in the village.

== See also ==
- Kikkeri
- Shravanabelagola
