= Dabbeghatta =

Village in Mandya district, Karnataka, India

Coordinates: 12.740222°N 76.385702°E

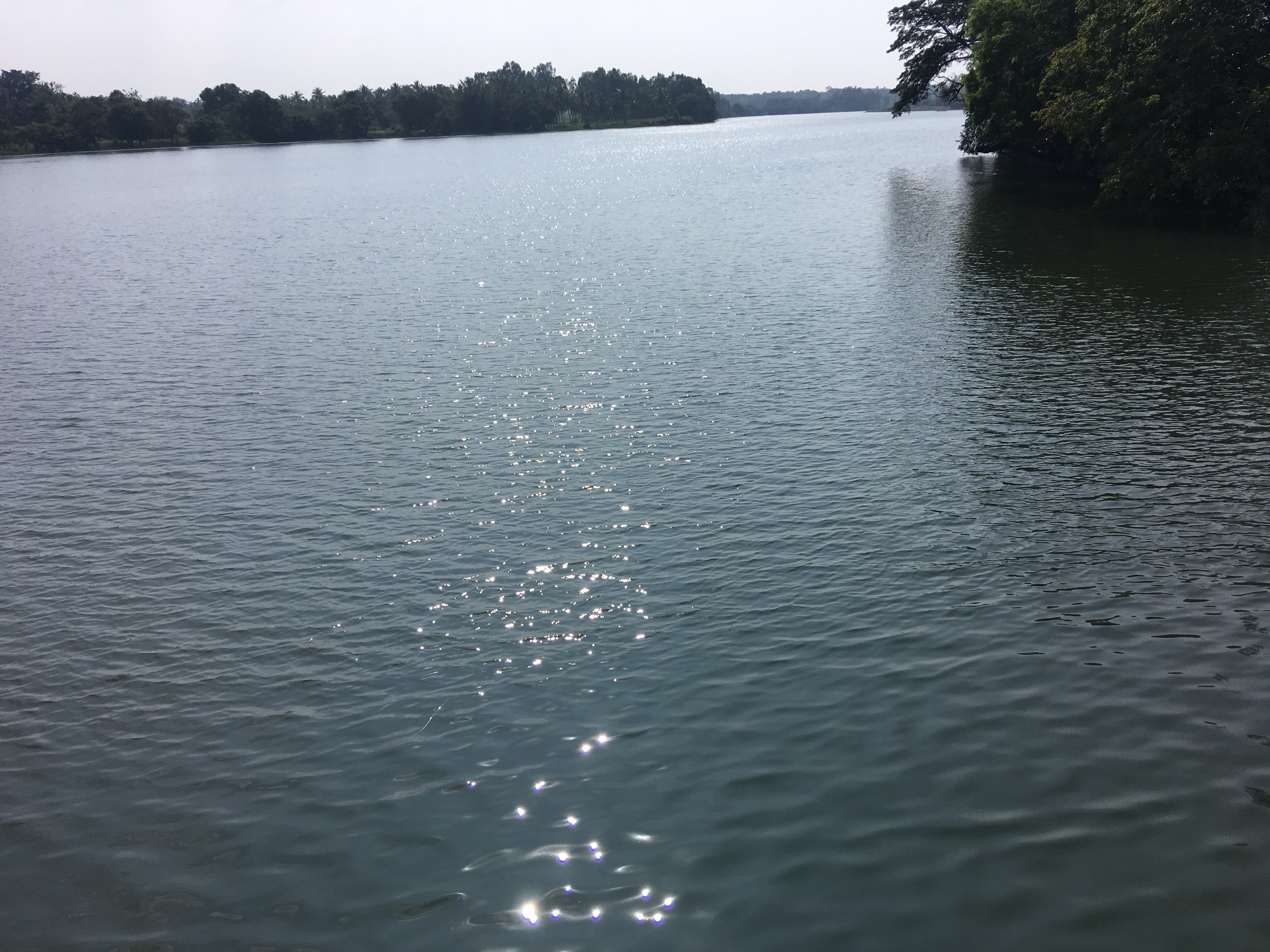
River Hemavathi in Dabbeghatta

Dabbeghatta is a small village in Mandya district of Karnataka state, India.

== Location ==
Dabbeghatta is located on the road between Kikkeri and Holenarasipura. The village has good water resources, and the Hemavati River flows through the village.

== Transportation ==
Mandagere Railway Station is one kilometer away from Dabbeghatta. Passenger trains between Mysore-Hassan-Shivamoga stop here.

== See also ==
- Kikkeri
- Krishnarajapete
- Holenarasipura
- Mandagere

== Gallery ==
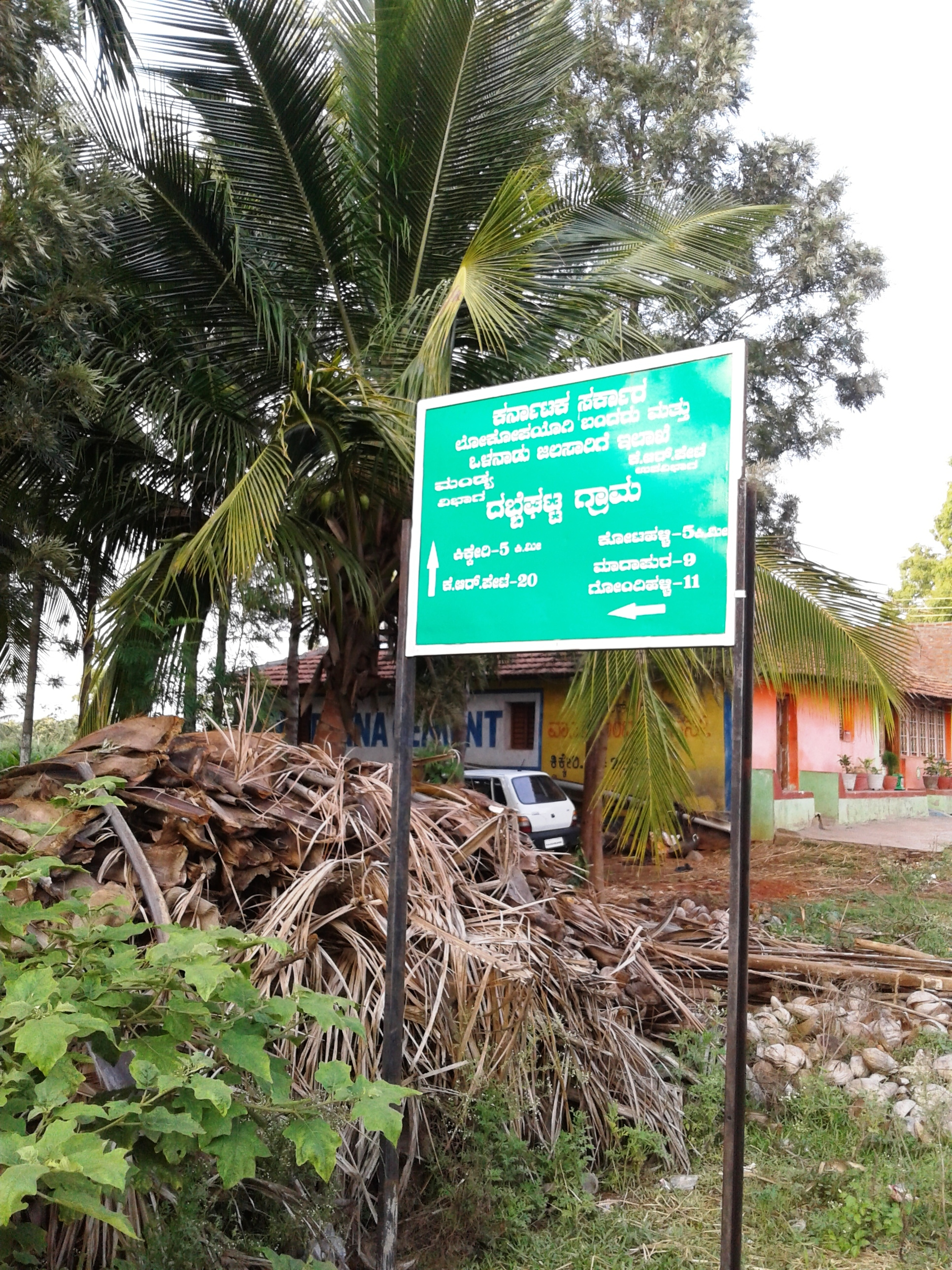
Village Junction

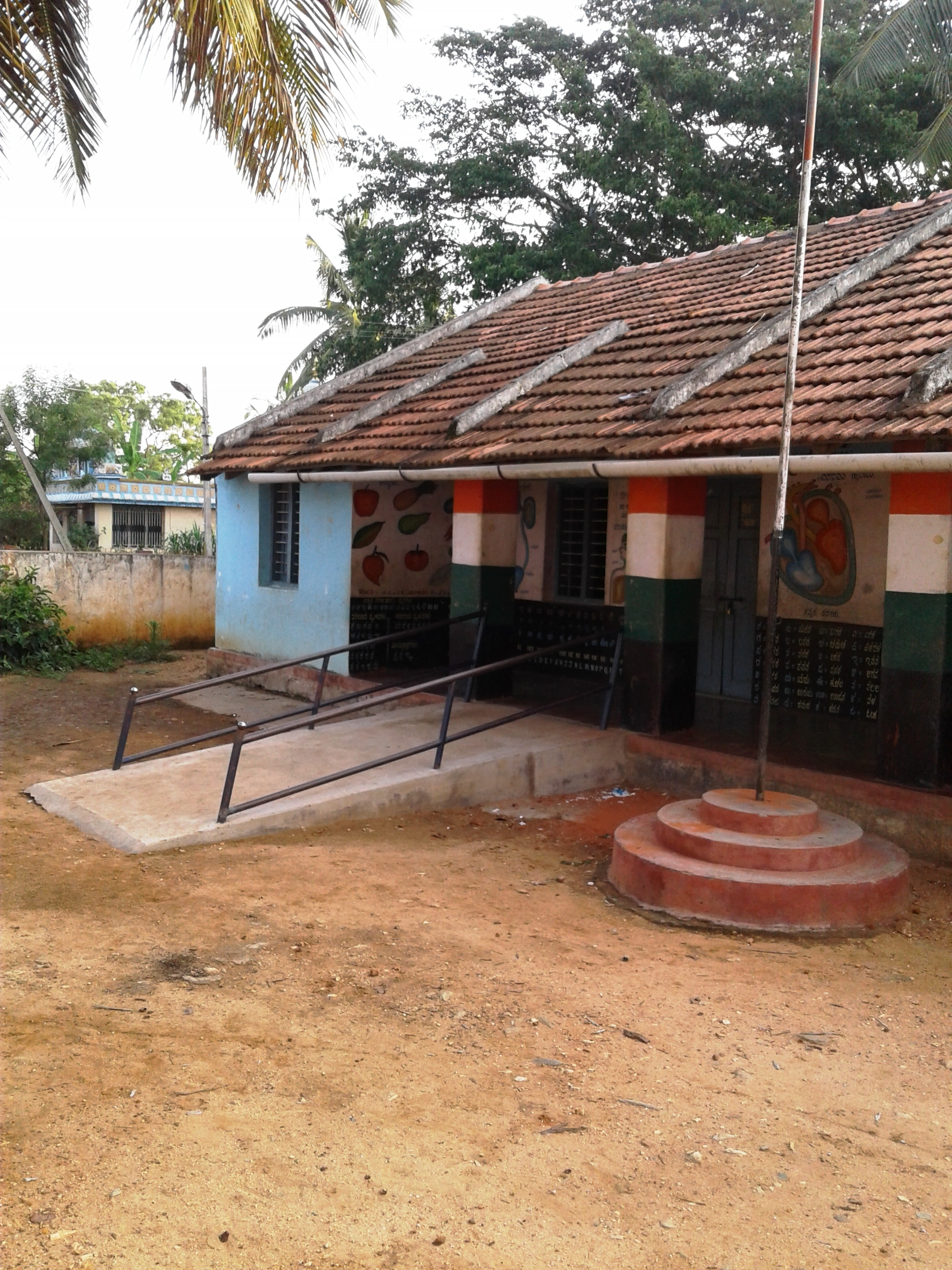
Primary School

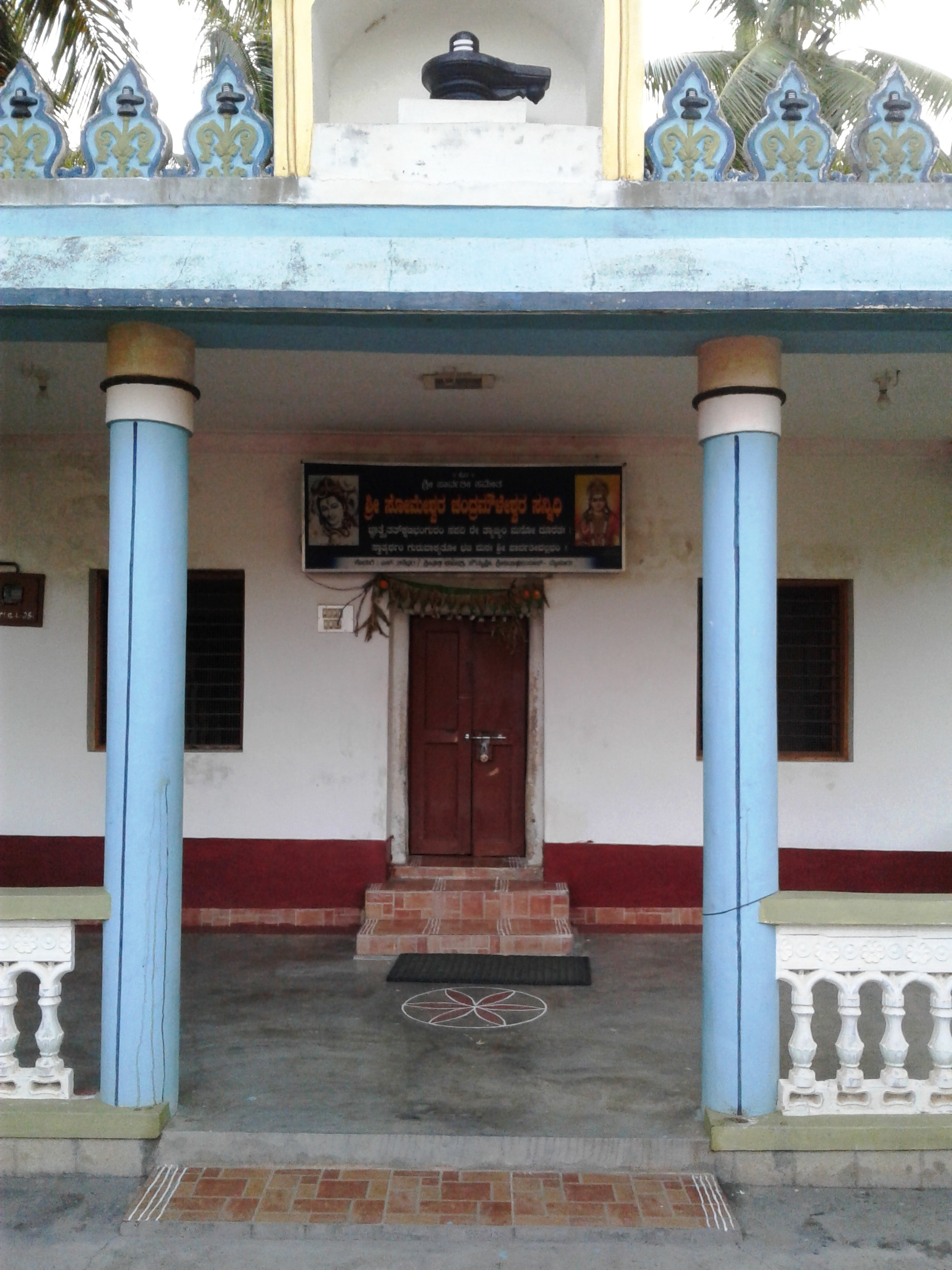
Temple
