= Kikkeri =

Town in Karnataka, India

- Village
- Location in Karnataka, India Kikkeri (India)
- Coordinates: 12.76°N 76.42°E
- Country: India
- State: Karnataka
- District: Mandya
- Talukas: Krishnarajapete

Government
  - Type: Panchayat raj
  - Body: Gram panchayat

Population (2011)
  - Total: 4,051

Languages
  - Official: Kannada
- Time zone: UTC+5:30 (IST)
- Postal code: 571423
- ISO 3166 code: IN-KA
- Vehicle registration: KA-11
- Website: karnataka.gov.in

Kikkeri is a small town in Krishnarajapete, Mandya district of Karnataka state, India.

== Schools in Kikkeri ==
- Karnataka Public School, Kikkeri
- karnataka Public School, Kikkeri

== People from Kikkeri ==
- K. S. Narasimhaswamy, an Indian poet in the Kannada language.
- K. S. L. Swamy, a renowned film maker in the Kannada Film Industry.

== See also ==
- Brahmeshvara Temple, Kikkeri
- Kikkeramma Temple, Kikkeri
- Dabbeghatta
- Govindanahalli
- Holenarasipura
- Mandagere
- Panchalingeshwara Temple, Govindanahalli
- Sasalu, Mandya
