= Hoysaleswara Temple =

12th-century Shiva temple in Halebidu, Karnataka

Hoysaleshwara Temple
- ಹೊಯ್ಸಳೇಶ್ವರ ದೇವಸ್ಥಾನ
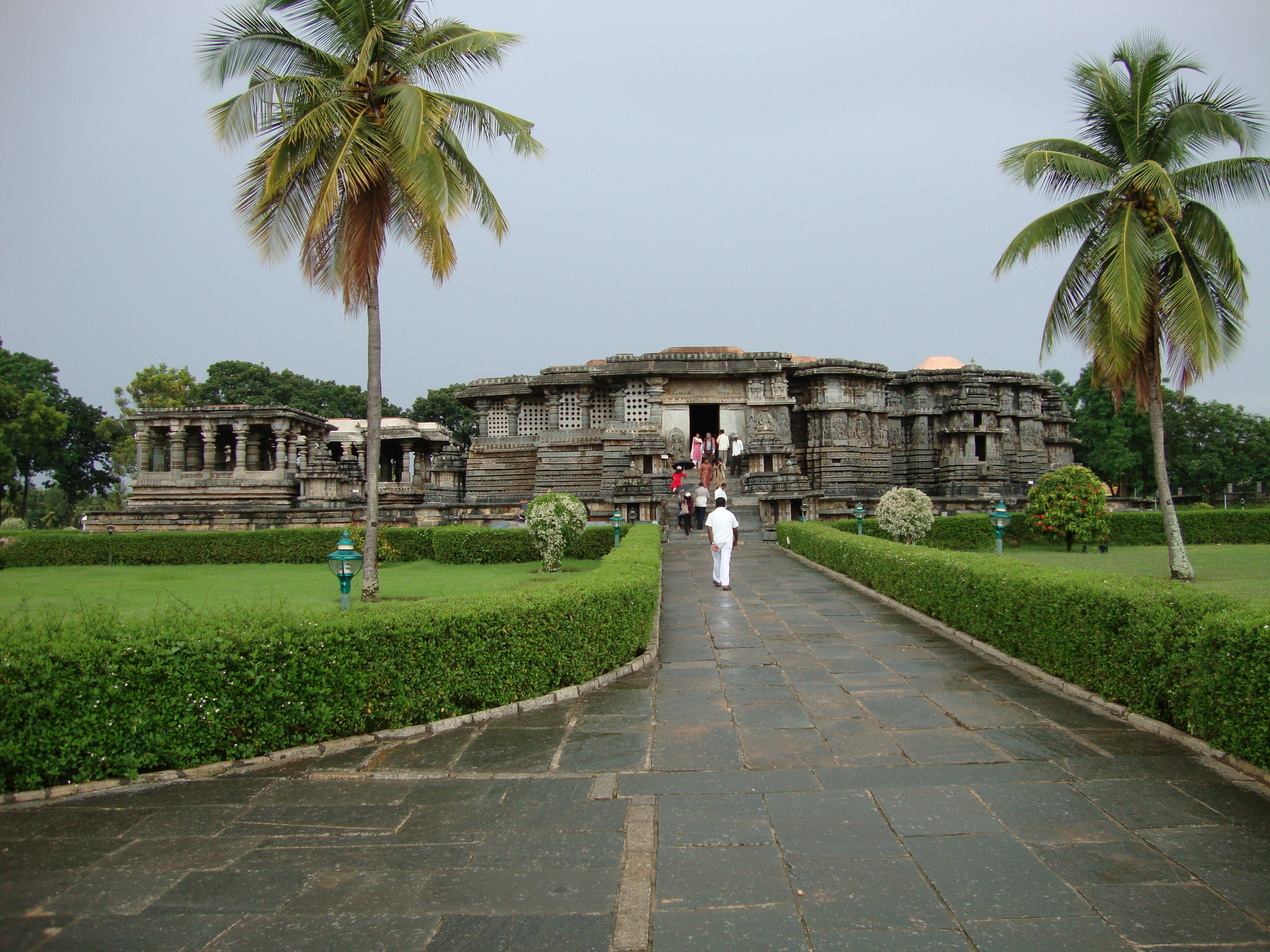
- Hoysaleswara temple at Halebidu

- Location in Karnataka Hoysaleswara Temple (Karnataka)

Religion
- Affiliation: Hinduism
- District: Hassan
- Deity: Shiva

Location
- Location: Halebidu
- State: Karnataka
- Country: India
- Coordinates: 13°12′47.5″N 75°59′42.0″E

Architecture
- Type: Hoysala
- Creator: Ketamalla, Hoysala Vishnuvardhana
- Completed: 12th-century

UNESCO World Heritage Site
- Official name: Sacred Ensembles of the Hoysalas
- Type: Cultural
- Criteria: i, ii, iv
- Designated: 2023 (45th session)
- Reference no.: 1670

Hoysaleshwara temple (also spelled as Hoysaleswara, Hoysaleśvara or Hoywalesvara temple), also referred simply as the Halebidu temple, is a 12th-century Hindu temple dedicated to the god Shiva. It is the largest monument in Halebidu, a town in the state of Karnataka, India, and the former capital of the Hoysala Empire. The temple was built on the banks of a large man-made lake, and sponsored by King Vishnuvardhana of the Hoysala Empire. Its construction started around 1121 CE and was complete in 1160 CE.

During the early 14th century, Halebidu was twice sacked and plundered by the Delhi Sultanate from northern India, and the temple and the capital fell into a state of ruin and neglect. It is 30 kilometres (19 mi) from Hassan city and about 210 kilometres (130 mi) from Bengaluru.

The Hoysaleswara temple is a Shaiva monument, yet reverentially includes many themes from Vaishnavism and Shaktism tradition of Hinduism, as well as images from Jainism.

The Hoysaleswara temple is a twin-temple dedicated to Hoysaleswara and Santaleswara Shiva lingas, named after the masculine and feminine aspects, both equal and joined at their transept. It has two Nandi shrines outside, where each seated Nandi face the respective Shiva linga inside. The temple includes a smaller sanctum for the Hindu Sun god Surya. It once had superstructure towers, but no longer and the temple looks flat. The temple faces east, though the monument is presently visited from the north side. Both the main temples and the Nandi shrines are based on a square plan. The temple was carved from soapstone.

It is notable for its sculptures, intricate reliefs, detailed friezes as well its history, iconography, inscriptions in North Indian and South Indian scripts. The temple artwork provides a pictorial window into the life and culture in the 12th century South India. About 340 large reliefs depict the Hindu theology and associated legends. Numerous smaller friezes narrate Hindu texts such as the Ramayana, the Mahabharata and the Bhagavata Purana. Some friezes below large reliefs portray its narrative episodes.

The artwork in Hoysaleswara temple is damaged but largely intact. Within a few kilometers of the temple are numerous ruins of Hoysala architecture, including the Jain Basadi complex and the Kedareshwara temple.

The Hoysaleswara Temple, along with the nearby Chennakeshava Temple at Belur and the Keshava Temple at Somanathapura was declared a World Heritage Site by UNESCO in 2023 as part of the Sacred Ensembles of the Hoysalas.

== Location ==
The Hoysaleswara Temple is in Halebidu, also called Halebeedu, Halebid, Dorasamudra. Halebidu is a town in Hassan district of the Indian state of Karnataka. It is about 30 kilometres (19 mi) northwest of Hassan. The temple is about 16 kilometres (9.9 mi) from Belur, Karnataka temples. Halebidu has no nearby airport, and is about 210 kilometres (130 mi) west of Bengaluru (IATA Code: BLR), about 4 hours drive accessible with a four lane NH75 highway through Hassan. Halebidu is connected by railway network at Hassan to major cities of Karnataka.

== History ==
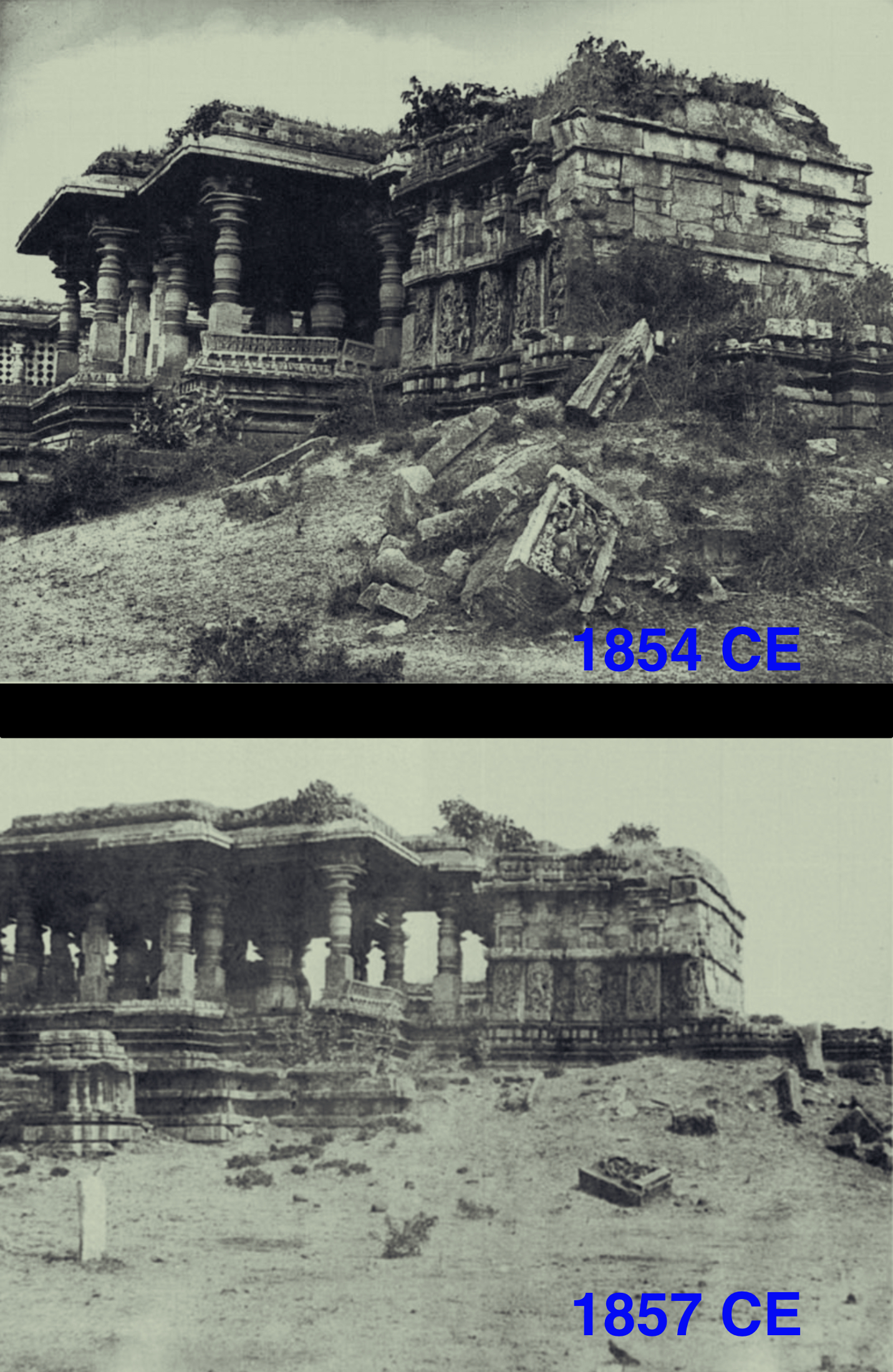
The Hoysalesvara temple was one of the first to be properly surveyed in Karnataka between 1801 and 1806. After the invention of photography, it was one of the earliest to be photographed in British India. These show neglect and scattered ruins.

The Hoysala period of South Indian history began about 1000 CE and continued through 1346 CE. In this period, they built around 1,500 temples in 958 centres. Halebidu was sanskritized as Dorasamudra in its inscriptions, possibly derived from Dvarasamudra (Sanskrit words "Dvara" (gateway, door) and Samudra (ocean, sea, large water body)). The capital used to be Belur, Karnataka, but Dorasamudra became the established capital under king Vishnuvardhana and served as the capital of the Hoyasala Empire for nearly 300 years.

Unlike other Hoysala temples that have survived into the modern age, and despite numerous inscriptions in the temple premises, the Hoysaleswara Temple lacks a dedication inscription. It is likely lost, along with the many other features of the original temple. An inscription found about five kilometers from the temple site, near the Kallesvara temple ruins in Ghattadahalli, states that Ketamalla – officer in the employ of king Vishnuvardhana constructed this temple. It also notes that the king made grant of lands to support the construction, the operation and the maintenance of the Shiva temple in Saka 1043, or 1121 CE. It was not the only temple built in that era. The inscriptions suggest that the capital consisted of numerous other temples, both of Hinduism and Jainism traditions, along with stepwells, ponds and mantapas (mandapas, public halls) in the vicinity of the large Dorasamudhra lake. It is the largest temple built by the Hoysalas that is dedicated to the Hindu god Shiva in South India.

The Hoysala Empire and its capital Dorasamudra was invaded, plundered and destroyed in early 14th century by the Delhi Sultanate armies of Alauddin Khilji, with Belur and Halebidu becoming the target of plunder and destruction in 1326 CE by another Delhi Sultanate army of Sultan Muhammad bin Tughlaq. The territory was taken over by the Vijayanagara Empire. The Hoysala kingdom, states James C. Harle, came to an end in mid 14th century, when King Ballala III was killed in a war with the Muslim army of Madurai Sultanate. Dorasamudra and its temples became ruins, the capital abandoned and the site became known as "Halebidu" (literally, "old camp or capital"). About 300 of the original Hoysala Empire temples survive in different states of damage, scattered around Karnataka. Of these, states Hardy, about 70 had been studied to varying degrees of detail by 1995.

With the defeat of Tipu Sultan in 1799, Mysore came under the influence of the colonial British rule and scholarship. The Hoysaleswara temple ruins were among the earliest surveyed, then earliest photographed in the 1850s, and the subject of several rounds of good will repairs and restoration that lacked thorough documentation. Ruin panels from other temples were reused here to cover the Nandi mandapa, parts of friezes used to repair the plinth. Thus, the Hoysaleswara temple as it is survives in the contemporary era is a composite of the original Hindu temple architecture and design that was open, to which stone screens with outer walls and doors were added by the 14th-century, whose crowning towers (shikhara) have been lost, and whose ruins were repaired and restored many times in the 19th and 20th-century. The temple was brought under the protection of the Archaeological Survey of India. Subsequent conservation work has included structural stabilization, chemical cleaning and restoration of sculptural elements.

== Description ==
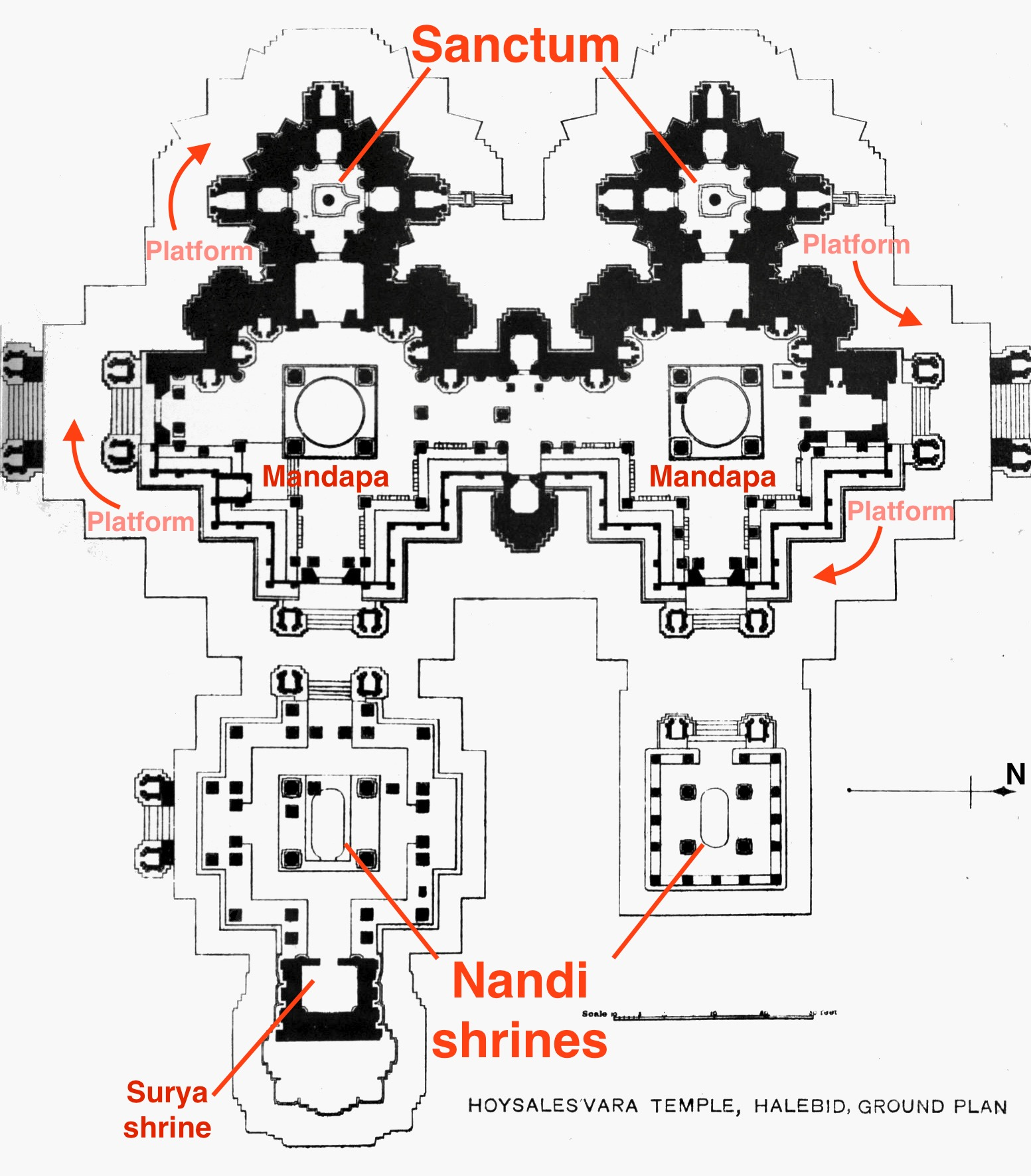
12th century Halebid Shiva temple plan annotated

The Hoysaleswara temple is a twin-temple, or dvikuta vimana (plan with two shrines and two superstructures). The two temples are of the same size, and their sanctums open to the east, facing sunrise. The sanctum of the "Hoysaleswara" (the king) and the other for "Shantaleswara" (the queen, Shantala Devi) both have a Shiva linga. Outside on the east side of the main temples are two smaller shrines, each with seated Nandi. To the east of the southern Nandi shrine is a smaller attached Surya shrine, where there is a 7 feet (2.1 m) tall Surya statue facing the Nandi and the sanctum. Historians such as Adam Hardy state that the Hoysaleswara temple shows evidence of other shrines but these are now missing, lost to history.

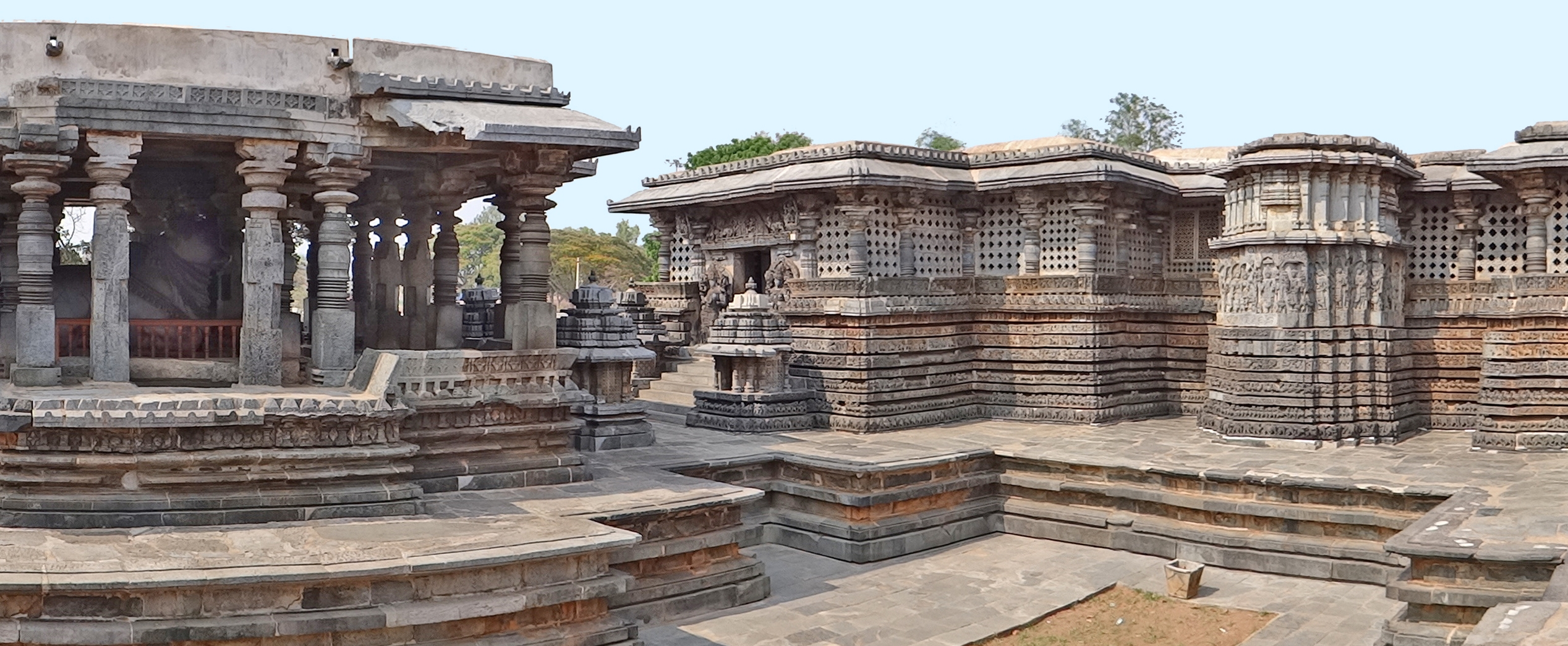
A Nandi shrine (left) facing the sanctum of the main temple

The temple complex as a whole is placed on a jagati (literally, worldly platform). The platform is 15 feet wide around the outer walls of the temple, meant for the visitor to walk on and view the artwork clockwise while completing the circumambulation of the sanctums. It is called the pradakshina-patha (path for circumambulation). The smaller shrines share the same jagati as the main temple, connected by stone stairs. The two sanctums are next to each other in a north–south alignment, both face east, and each have in front a mandapa (also spelled mantapa, community hall). The two mandapas are connected giving a view of a large, open navaranga for family and public gatherings.

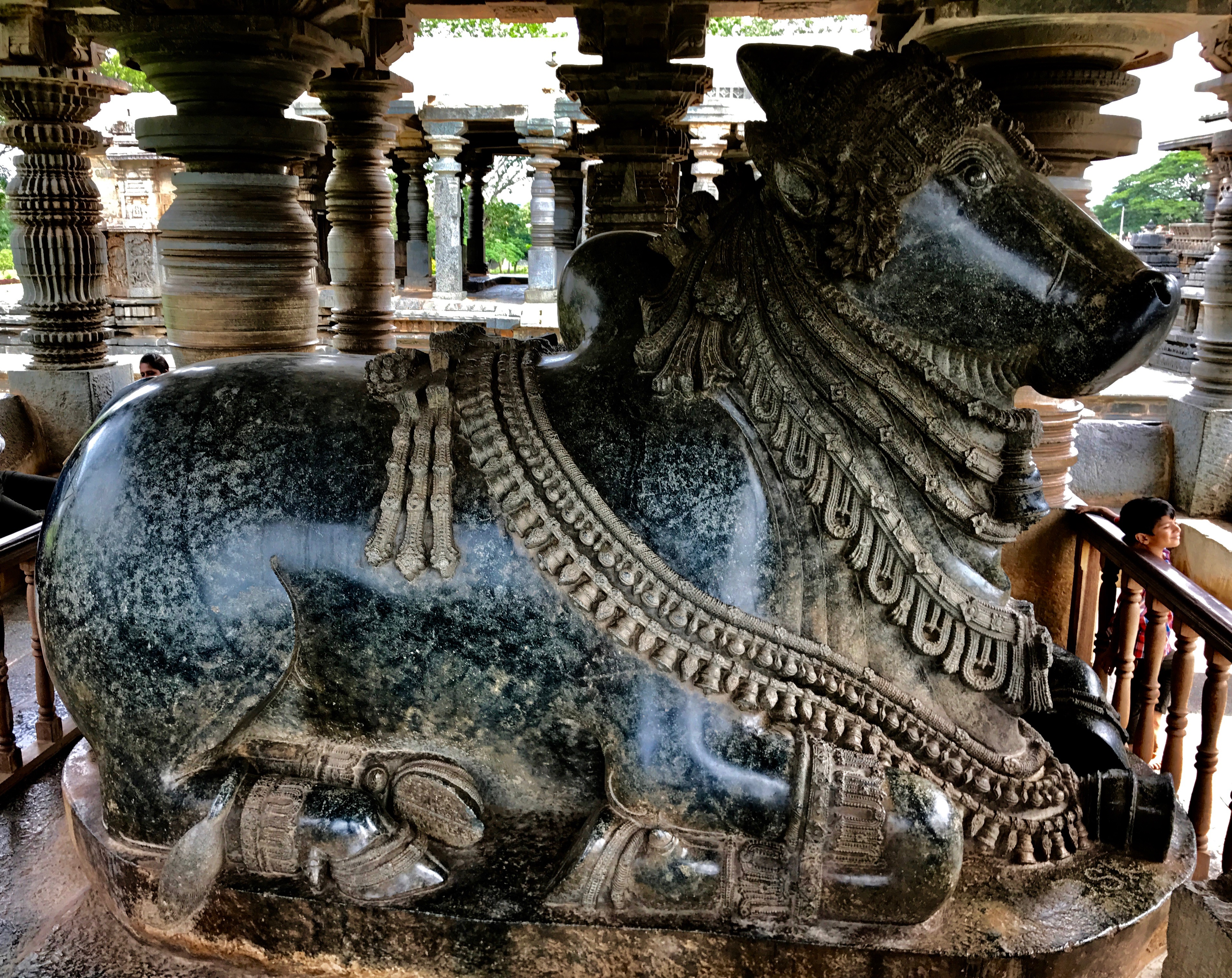
North Nandi shrine

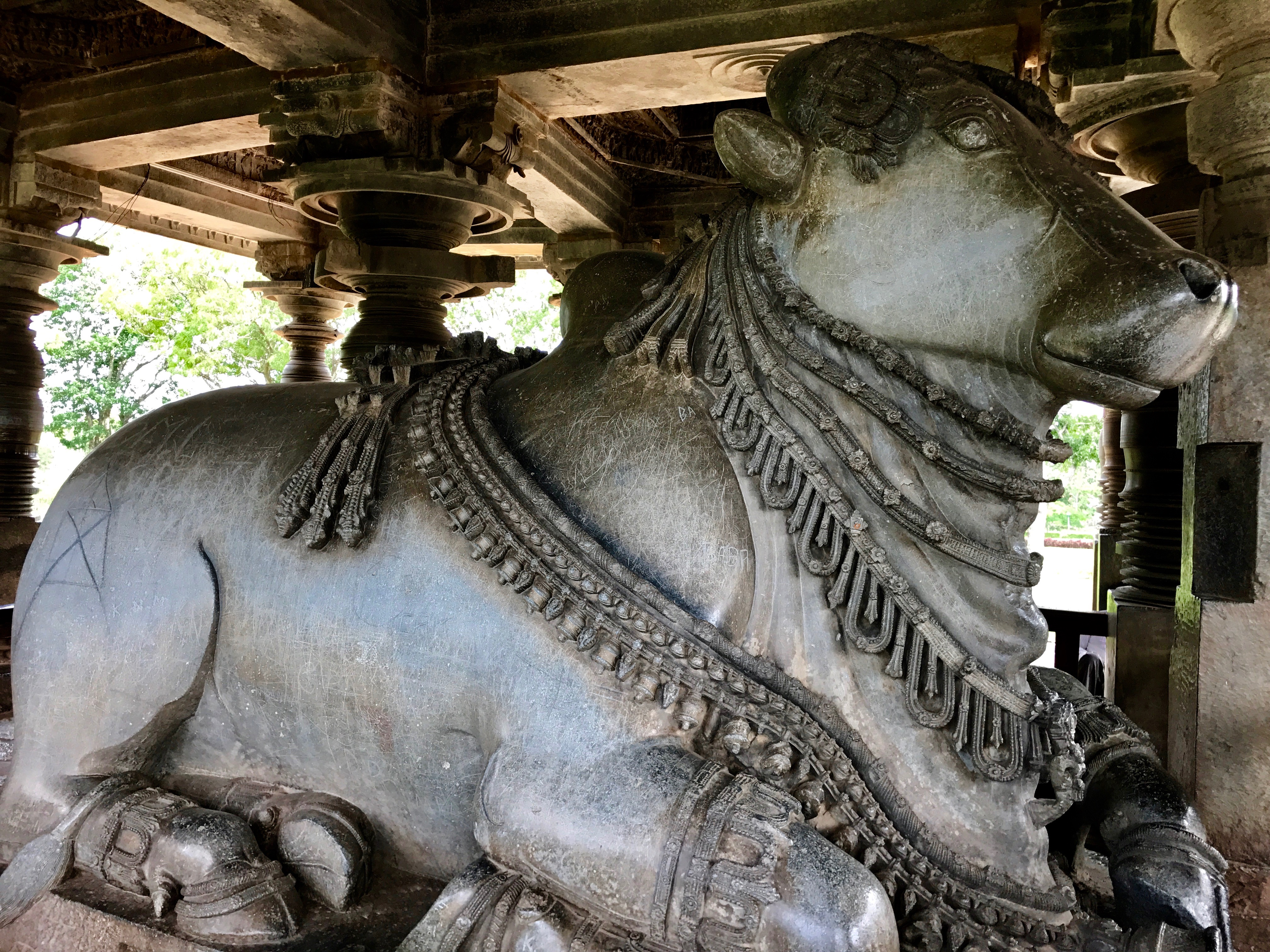
South Nandi shrine

The temple had towers on top of each sanctum, but they are now missing. According to Foekema, these towers must have followed the star shape of the shrine, because Hoyasala temples that are better preserved have them. The superstructure over the vestibule which connects the shrine to the mantapa, called sukanasi (a low tower that looks like an extension of the main tower) is also missing. Similar the row of decorated miniature roofs, the eastern perimeter walls and other shrines with the main temple are all gone.

The temple was built with chloritic schist, more commonly known as greenschist or soapstone. The soapstone is soft when quarried and easier to carve into intricate shapes, but hardens over time when exposed to air.

=== Outer walls ===
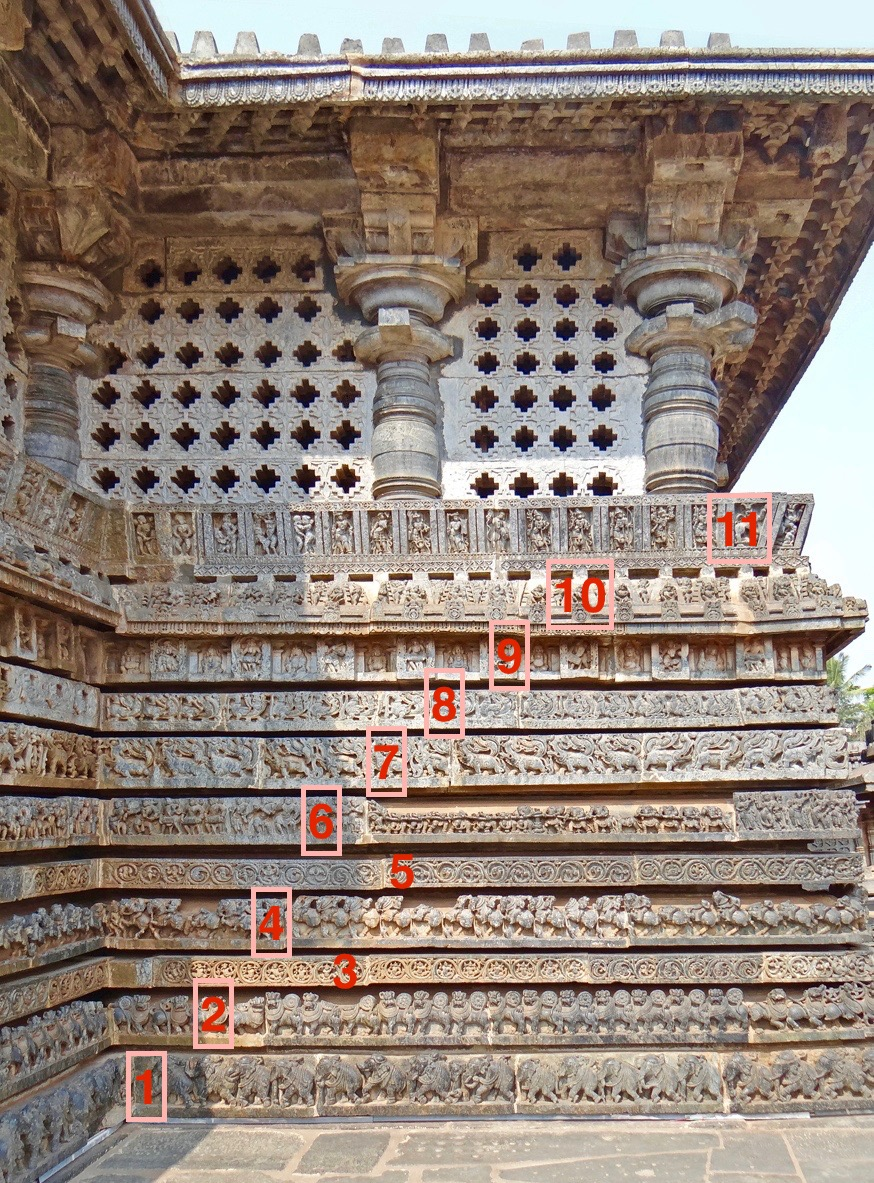
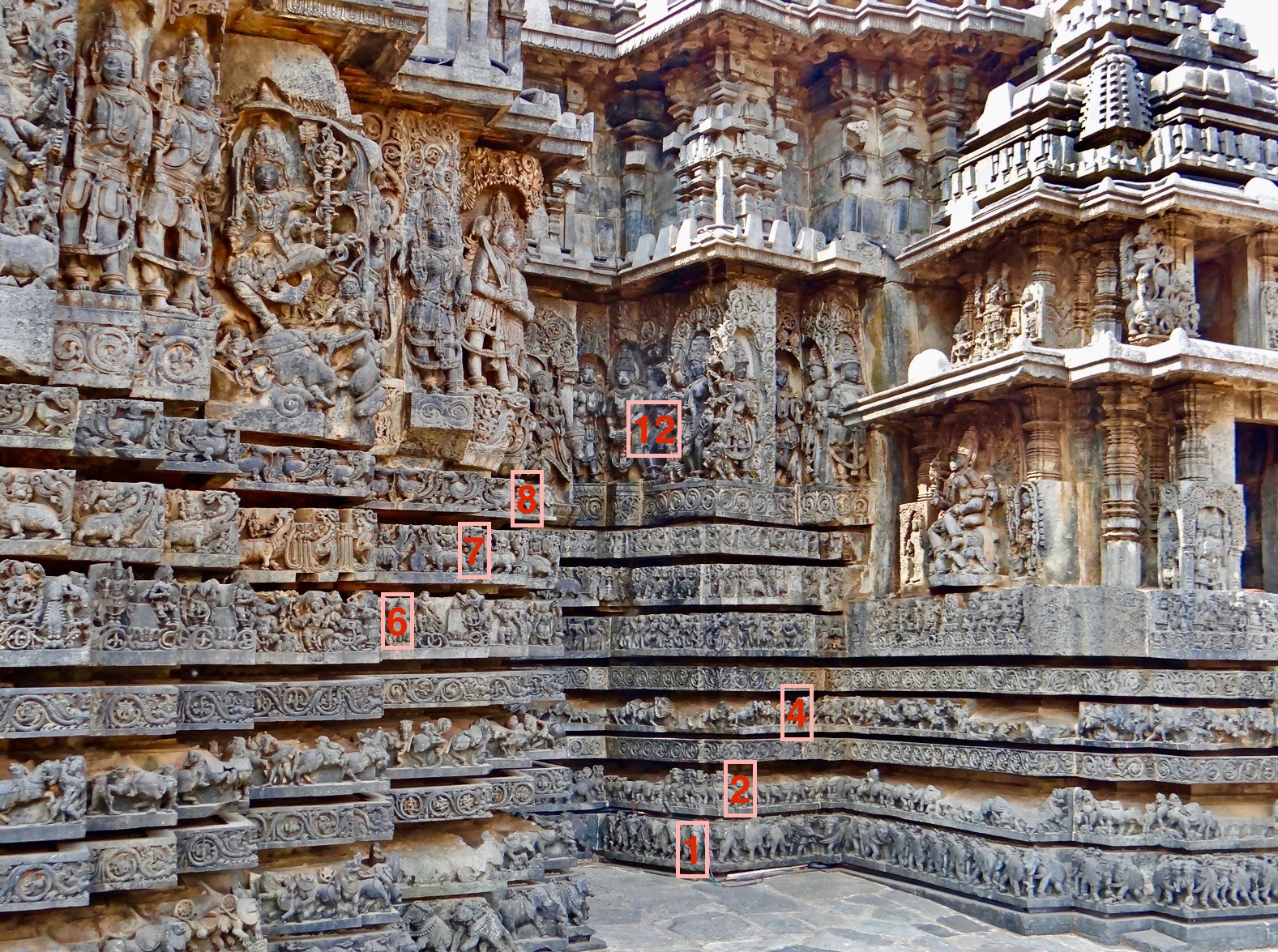
Artwork on the outer walls of the temple are in bands. 1: marching playful elephants; 2: lions; 3: thin miniature scroll; 4: horsemen in different postures; 5: thin miniature scroll; 6: friezes narrating legends from the Hindu texts; 7: makaras; 8: hamsa and peacocks; 9: professionals, daily life of people alternately standing and sitting; 10: mythical creatures, festivals, ceremonies; 11: artha, kama, dharma scenes including courtship and mithuna (eroticism, sex), various occupations, some mythical scenes; 12: large image panels (deities, spiritual stories from Hindu texts).

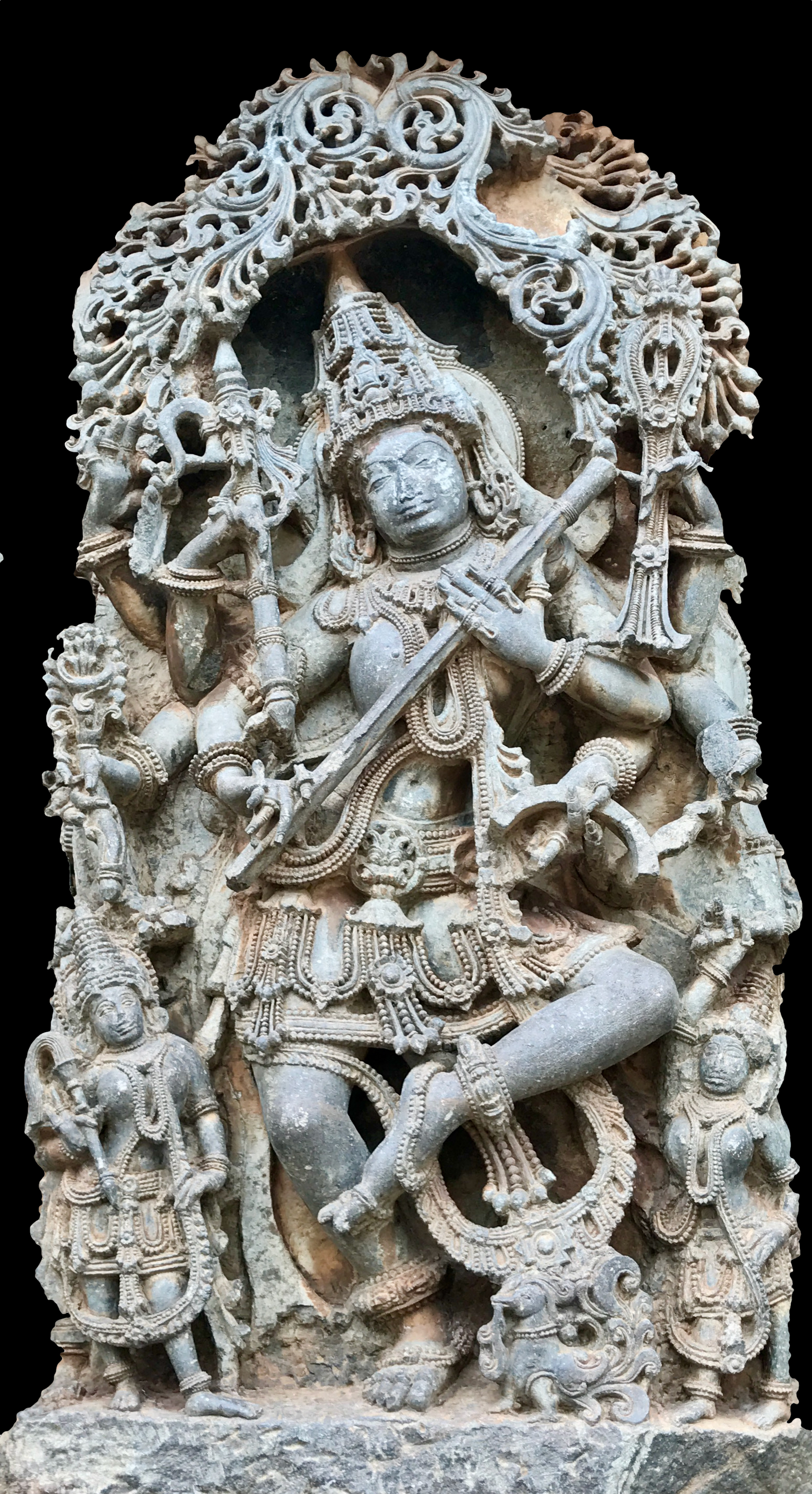
Dancing Saraswati holding a manuscript, pen, the alapini vina and other symbols of knowledge and arts.

The temple outer walls is intricately carved. Its lowest layers consist of bands with friezes that consist of (from bottom to top) elephants, lions, scrolls with nature and miniature dancers, horses, scrolls, scenes from Hindu texts, mythical beasts (makara) and swans. According to Shadakshari Settar, the artwork shows details as "no two lions are alike in the entire span that covers more than a furlong (200 metres)", the artists "captured the Ramayana and the Mahabharata, and the main episodes of the Bhagavata". The temple's outer wall is a pictorial narration of Hindu epics, and its middle portion has large panels where "the entire pantheon of Hindu divinities are presented, it is a manual of Hindu iconography", states Settar. According to Foekema and other art historians, the quality and quantity of the epics-related "friezes are amazing", but the panel series do not complete the story in a stretch, rather after a stretch, another text is intermingled in for a while. The outer walls of the Hoysaleswara temple shrines feature 340 large reliefs.

The friezes and wall images on the outer wall predominantly narrate the Ramayana, the Mahabharata, the Bhagavata Purana, the other major Shaiva and Vaishnava Puranas. Some main displays include (clockwise):

- On the north-east outer wall of the northern Shiva temple: Court scene, Bhairava, Bharavi, Samudra manthan, musicians with 12th century musical instruments, Sukracharya, Kacha-Devayani legend, Lakshmi, Umamahesvara, Vamana-Bali-Trivikrama legend, Indra legend, Virabhadra, Shiva in yoga.
- On the south-east outer wall of the northern Shiva temple: Dancers, Bhairava, Bhairavi, Umamahesvara.
- On the north-east outer wall of the southern Shiva temple: Krishna's lila from Bhagavata, Vasudeva in prison followed by carrying newborn Krishna across Yamuna legend, Krishna slaying Putani and other asuri, Krishna stealing butter, Krishna playing flute with humans and animals dancing, Krishna and Pradyumna legend, Krishna lifts the goverdhana, Yudhisthira and Sakuni playing dice, Kichaka molests Draupadi and Bhima meets Kichaka dressed up as a woman to return justice.

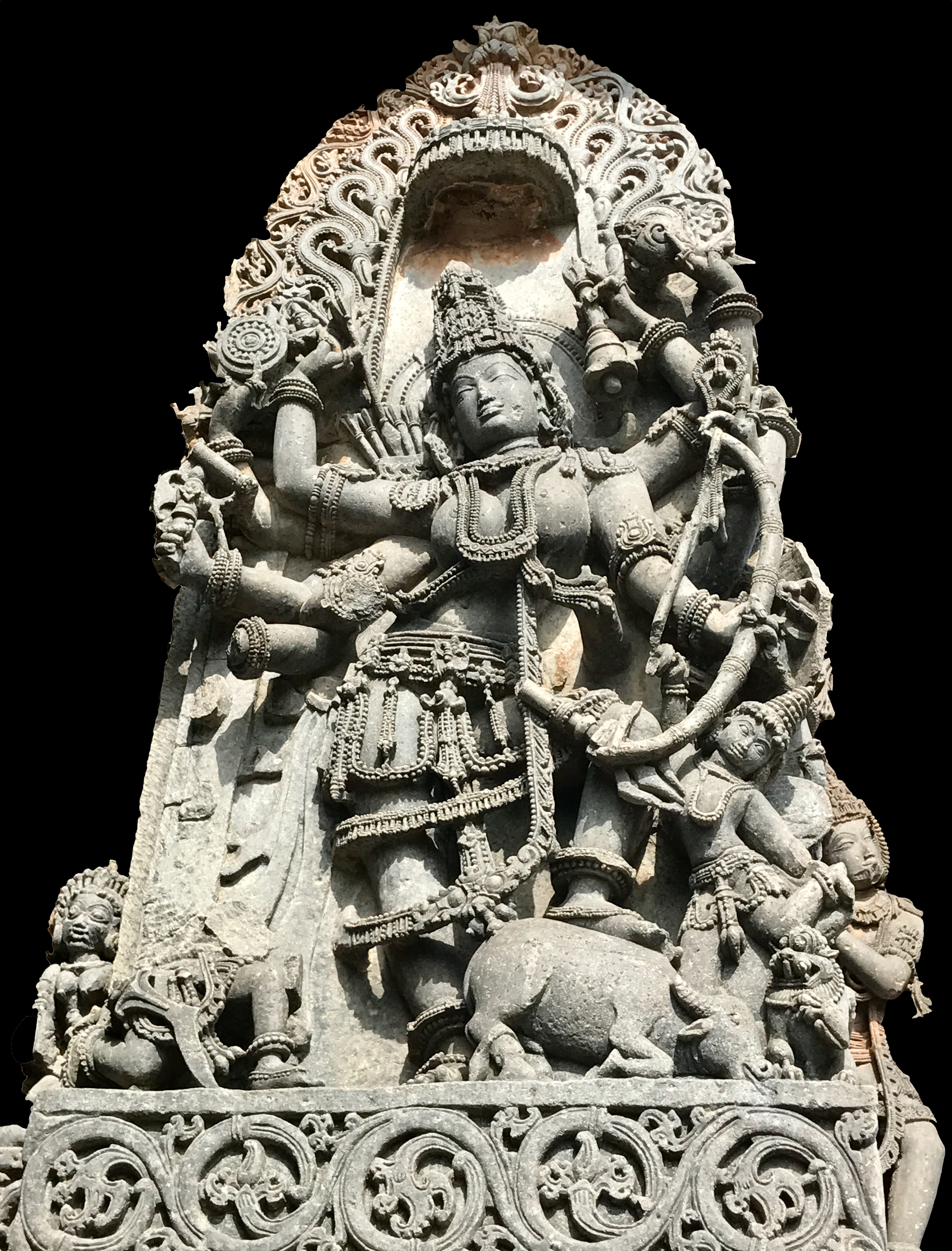
Durga as Mahishasuramardini killing buffalo demon.

- On the south-east outer wall of the southern Shiva temple: Bhisma parva and Drona parva of the Mahabharata; Vishnu standing, dancers and musicians celebrating the victory of Arjuna over Drona.
- On the south-west outer wall of the southern Shiva temple: Arjuna with Krishna episodes in the Mahabharata; dancers festively celebrating the victory of Pandavas; the Mohini legends in the Vedas; Dakshinamurti, Umamahesvara, Tandavesvara, Vishnu; Arjuna meets Shiva legends; Aranya parva of the Mahabharata; Bhima and Bhagadatta legend; Bhairava, Ganesha, Vishnu and Vamana; Dancers and musicians at the marriage of Parvati and Shiva; Vishnu-Shiva-Brahma together; Shanmukha and Tarakasura legend; Tandavesvara; three face Brahma on a swan; Shiva with Ganesha and Kartikeya; Narasimha doing yoga; Durga as Mahishasuramardini; Mohini dancing.

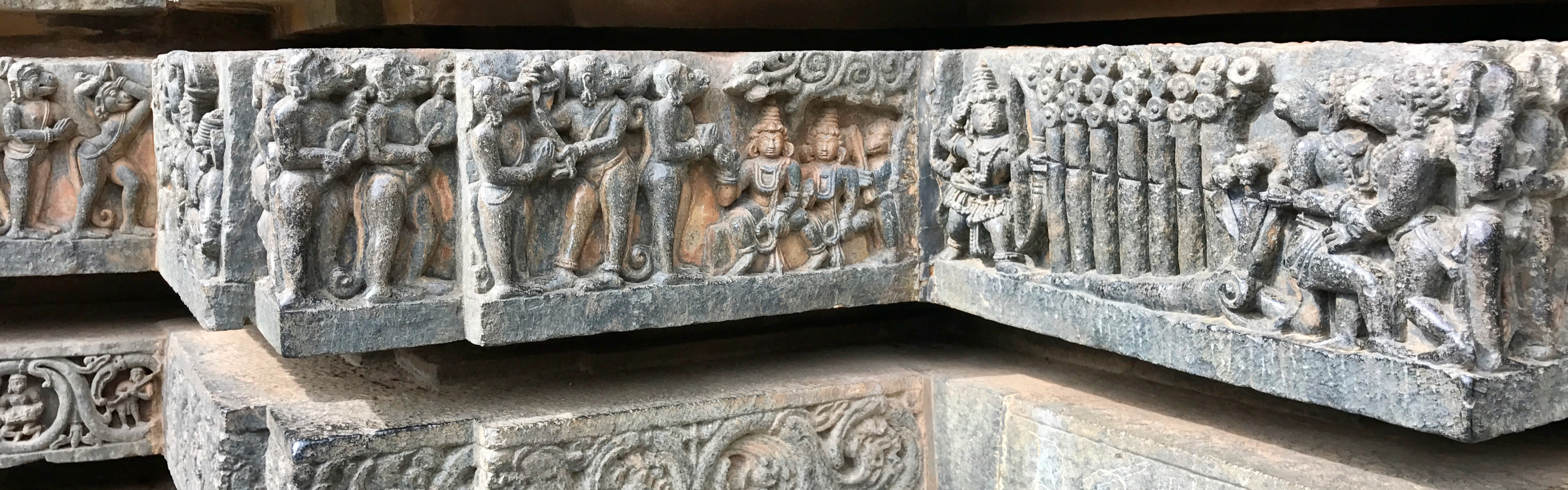
A Ramayana frieze, outer wall.

- On the north-west outer wall of the southern Shiva temple: Reclining Vishnu with all gods and goddesses in reverence; Prahlada-Hiranyakasipu-Narasimha legend from the Bhagavata Purana; Mohini as Bhairavi with Bhairava; Rama fighting Ravana from the Ramayana; Indra seated; Brahma with Saraswati; Karna-Arjuna and Bhina-Dussasana legends from the Mahabharata; Umamaheshvara, Ganesha; a kissing scene between a man and woman; musicians, dancers; Mohini stories; more courtship and kissing scenes; Kali Shakti legends; Arjuna legends.
- On the south-west outer wall of the northern Shiva temple: standing images of Brahma, Shiva, Vishnu, Durga, Saraswati, Kama and Rati, Parvati, Indrakila legend; Parvati doing yoga; Shiva is infatuated by Mohini; Ramayana stories including the golden deer, the first meeting with Hanuman and Sugriva, Rama shooting an arrow through seven palms, Hanuman giving Rama's ring to Sita; Mohini legends; reclining Vishnu on Sesha giving birth to the cosmic cycle; Vamana legend; avatars of Vishnu; Shiva and Ganesha dancing together; twelve Adityas from the Vedas; Arjuna-Bhisma legends; Shiva and Vishnu's female avatar Mohini dancing together.
- On the north-west outer wall of the northern Shiva temple: Nataraja in Tandava dance; Durga and the Saptamatrika; legends of Abhimanyu, Drona, Krishna with Arjuna in Mahabharata; Nataraja; eight forms of Rudra; Mohini dancing; Bharavi; Sarasvati dancing, Shiva and Ganesha dancing, angry Narasimha, various forms of Vishnu, dancing Ganesha with Gajasuramardana Shiva; Kartikeya; Parvati; dancers and musicians.

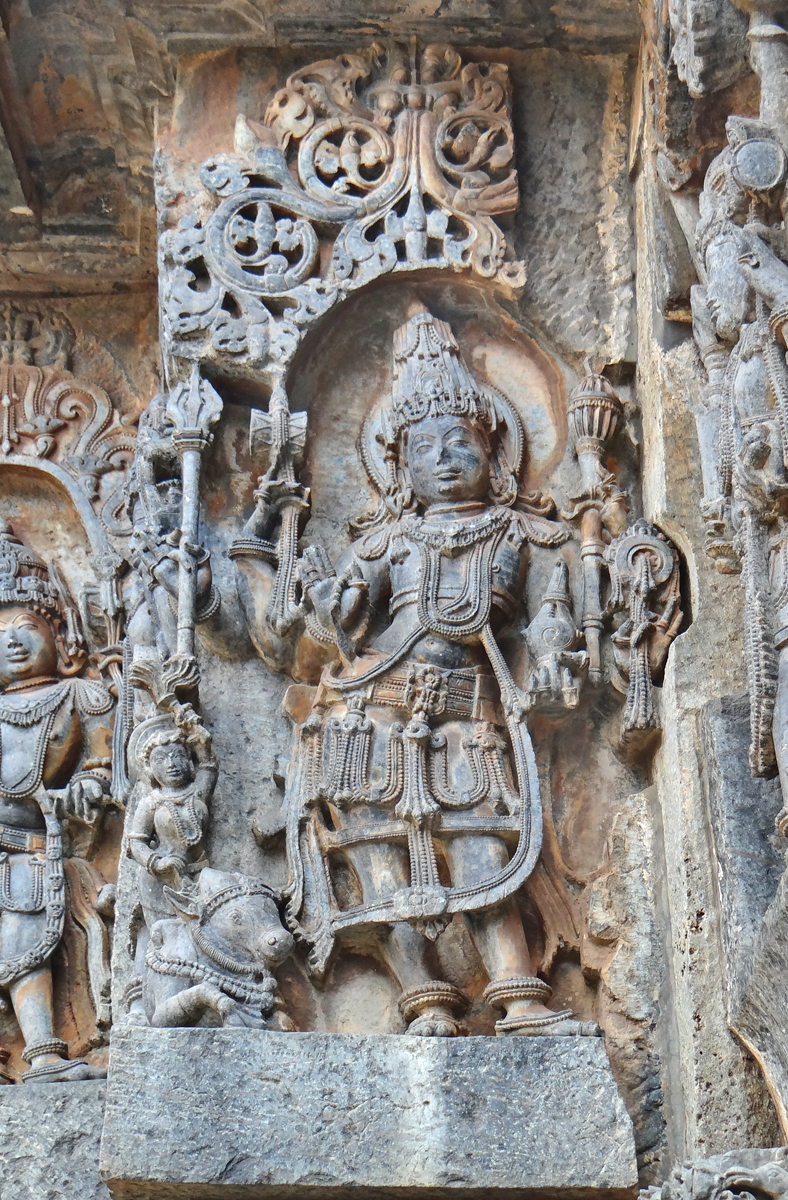
Harihara (left half Shiva, right Vishnu) at Hoysaleshwara

In terms of theology from different Hindu traditions, the large images on the outer walls of the west side present the following frequencies (excluding small panels and miniature friezes):

- Shiva: as Umamahesvara (8), as Nataraja and destroyer of various demons (25), Dakshinamurti (1), as nude Bhairava (6)
- Shakti: as Parvati forms of Durga, Mahishasuramardini, Kali and others (18)
- Vishnu: seated or standing (15), Krishna as Venogopala (12), Varaha (2), Narasimha (4), Vamana (1), Trivikrama (1)
- Harihara (half Vishnu, Half Shiva) (1)
- Ganesha: seated or standing (4)
- Kartikeya: on peacock (1), under seven-hooded serpent (2)
- Brahma (4)
- Saraswati: seated or standing (9)
- Vedic deities: Indra, Surya and others (4)
- Others: Vishnu in his female avatar Mohini clothed and nude, Shiva with Mohini, Arjuna and others (not counted)

The walls on the other side have more large images.

=== Doorways and mantapa ===
The temple has four entrances. The one normally used by visitors as main entry nowadays is the northern entrance closest to the parking lot. There is one entry on the south side and two on the east side, facing two large detached open pavilions whose ceiling is supported by lathe turned pillars.

The temple originally had an open navaranga, wherein the mandapa pavilions were visible from outside shrines and the outside was visible to those in the mandapa. In the era of Hoysala king Narasimha I, the mantapa was closed, doors were added and perforated stone screens placed, according to an inscription found in the temple. Along with the four doors, the later artists added dvarapalas and decorations as follows:

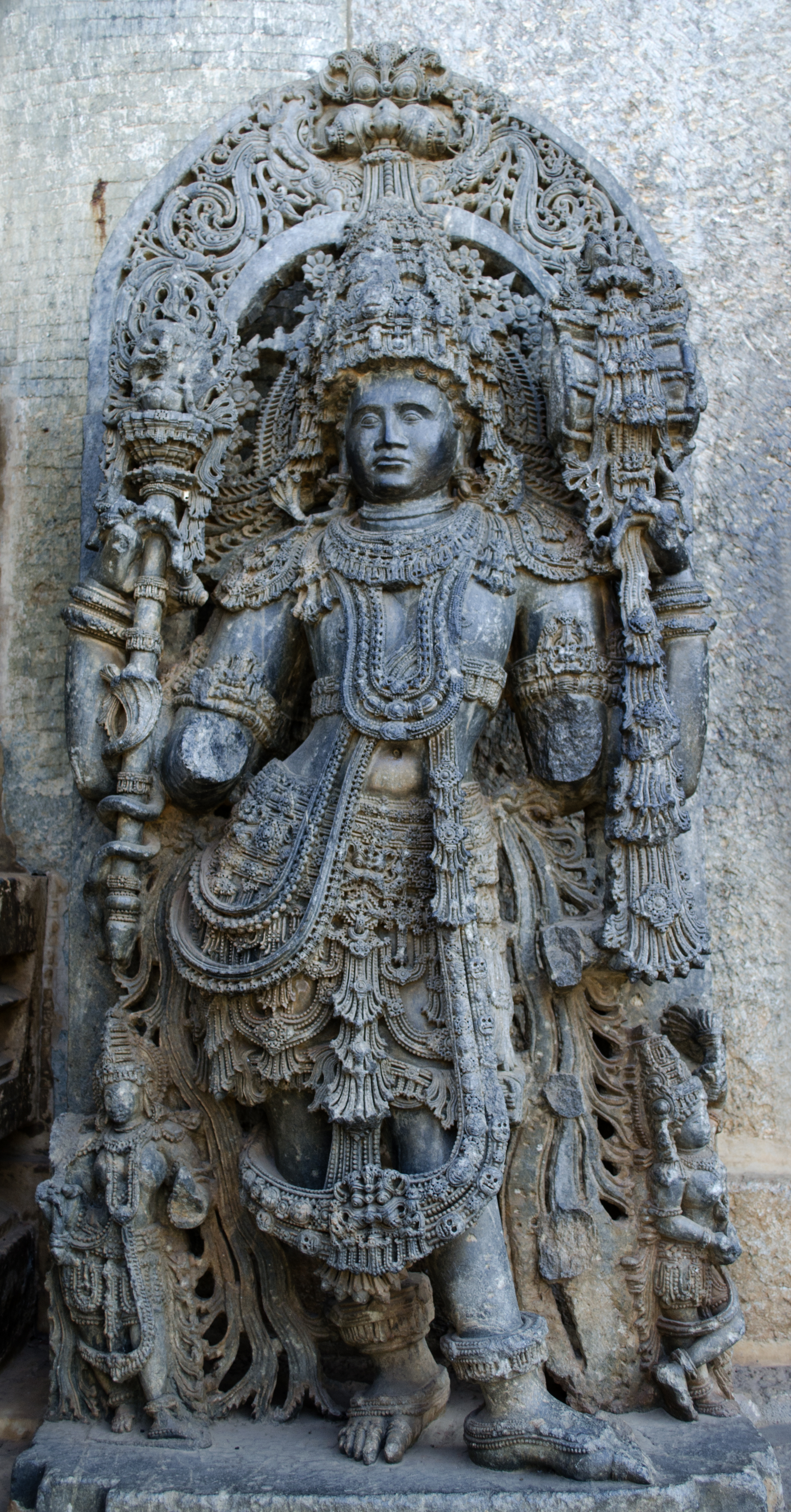
A better preserved dvarapala at mantapa entrance (hands broken).

- Southern entrance: six feet high dvarapalas wearing jewelry on both sides of the doorway. Each has four hands (two broken, others damaged), wear jatamakuta, have third eye and fangs, and stand in S-shaped tribhanga pose. They hold Shiva icons such as damaru, cobra, trisula and others. They were defaced at some point. Attempts were made in the 20th century to trim, restore and re-polish the dvarapala faces, but it created a disproportionate artificial look. Above the door lintel, there is artwork showing a Nataraja (Tandava) along with Nandi, other dancers and musicians.
- Southeastern entrance: similar to southern entrance, two hands broken but the faces are better preserved. Above the door lintel, the carving is the best preserved entrance Nataraja with ten hands (one damaged), accompanied on left by Narasimha, Saraswati, Brahma, Ganesha, Parvati, one deity damaged and unclear and Shiva, while the right side has Shiva, Parvati, Bhairava, Indrani, Keshava, Surya and Parvati.
- Northeastern entrance: the doorway is damaged and dvarapalas are missing though the pedestal and panels remain. The carvings above the door lintel are defaced.
- Northern entrance: used by modern-day tourists. The original dvarapalas are lost, and two replacement mispaired dvarapalas were recovered from the ruins of the region for tourists. The scene above the door lintel is also damaged and inferior in execution.

Outside the southern doorway, in the park, are large statues, one of Ganesha. The statue was among those which were originally farther out at the temple premises outer gate, but damaged and collected from ruins there. They were recovered and placed close to the temple. The navaranga includes two small niches facing each other between the two temples where they are joined at the transept. These have carvings and artwork, but the statues inside each is missing. There is a stone panel near the western niche with a large Sanskrit inscription in a North Indian and a South Indian script.

=== Pillars and ceilings ===
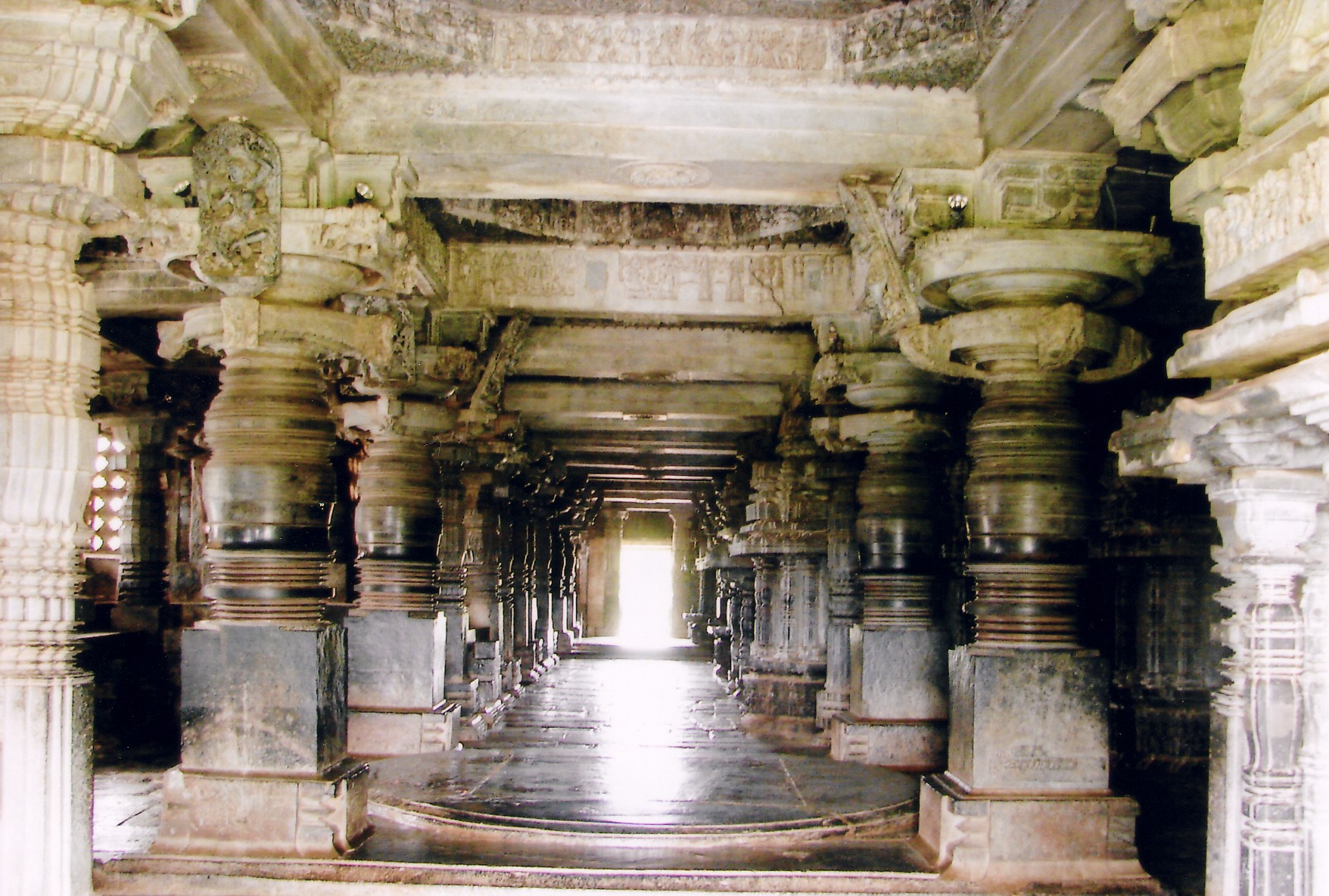
Lathe turned pillars in mantapa of Hoysaleshwara temple in Halebidu

The interior walls of the temple are quite plain compared to the outer wall, except for the lathe turned pillars that run in rows between the north and south entrances. The four pillars in front of each shrine are the most ornate and the only ones that have the madanika sculptures in their pillar brackets.

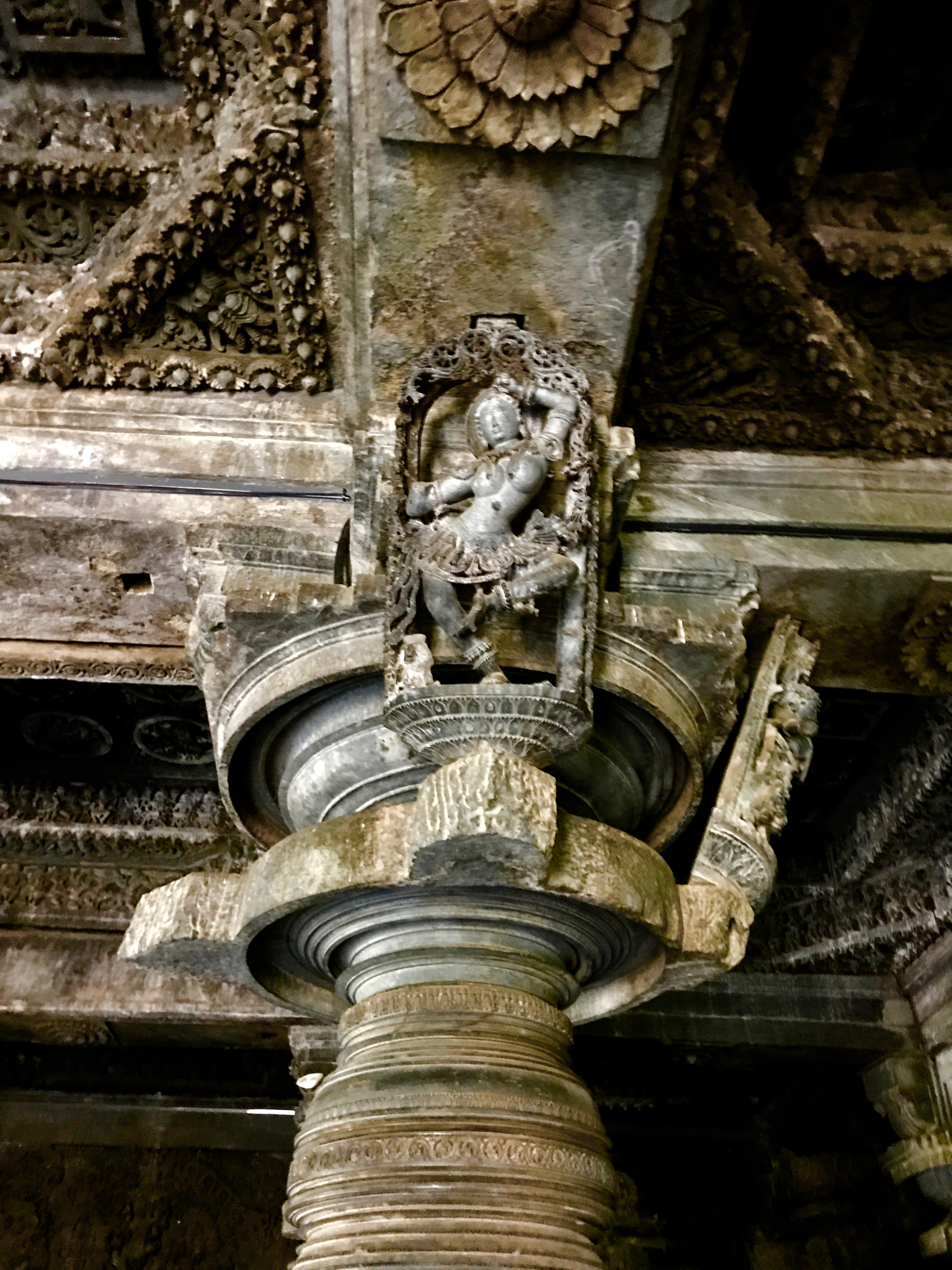
Pillar and ceiling carvings with a damaged madanakai.

The fused mandapa features a row of pillars aligned along the north-west axis. In the central navaranga of each temple's mandapa are four pillars and a raised ceiling that is intricately carved. Each of the four pillars of this central navaranga had four standing madanakai (Salabhanjika, mostly female) figures, or a total of 16 standing figures per temple. Of the 32 figures on the central pillars for the two temples, 11 remain. Only 6 damaged ones have survived in the north temple and 5 in the south temple. A closer examination of the pillar's capital suggests that there was a figure on each pillar in the eastern row facing the sunrise, but all of these show signs of destruction and none of those images have survived. The pillar near the second eastern door have two damaged madanakai, but the better preserved are those in the central navaranga.

=== Sanctum ===
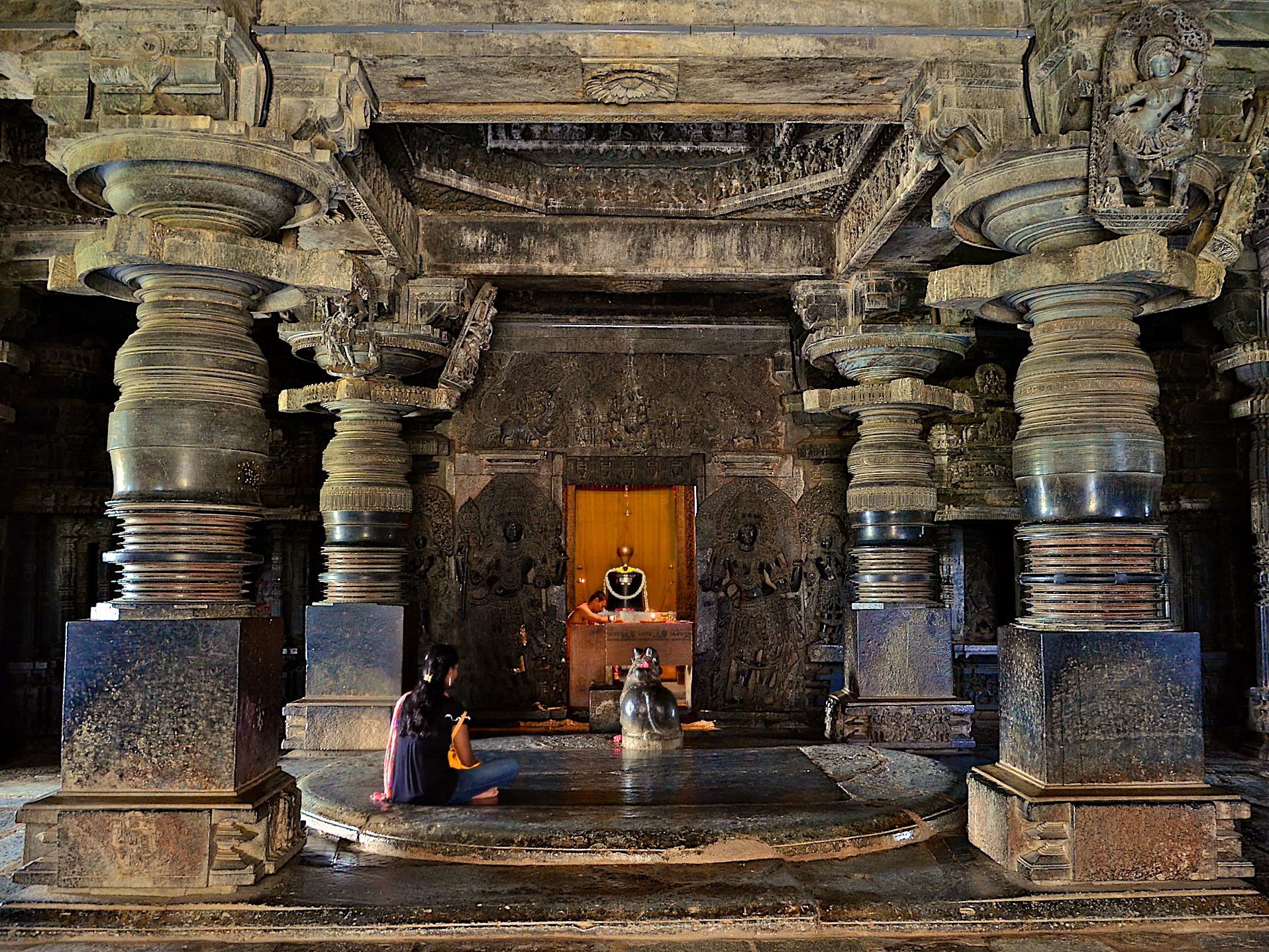
A sanctum inside the Hoysaleshwara temple in Halebidu

The twin-temple has two sanctums (garbha griha), both with Shiva linga. One sanctum is dedicated to "Hoysaleswara" Shiva (the king) and the other for "Shantaleswara" Shiva (the queen, Shantala). Both are of equal size. Each sanctum is a square with a darsana dvara (view doorway) on the east, with three inches on the north, west and south. The doorways are flanked on each side by a dvarapala, each leading to a sukanasi (vestibule chamber). There is intricate carving above the lintel between the dvarapalas, presenting Shiva with Parvati, along with other devas and devis, as well as two large makaras (mythical syncretic sea creatures). On the makaras are Varuna and his wife Varuni riding. The doorjambs are decorated with purnaghatas (vessels of abundance). The sanctum square originally had a tower (shikhara) above rising towards the sky to complete the vimana superstructure, but the towers have been lost to history and the temple looks flat. The sanctum walls are plain, avoiding distraction to the devotee and focussing the attention of the visitor at the spiritual symbol.

The temple has smaller shrines with its own sanctum. For example, the Nandi shrines feature a Nandi in its sanctum, while the Surya shrine features the Hindu Sun god.

=== Maize-like muktaphala objects ===
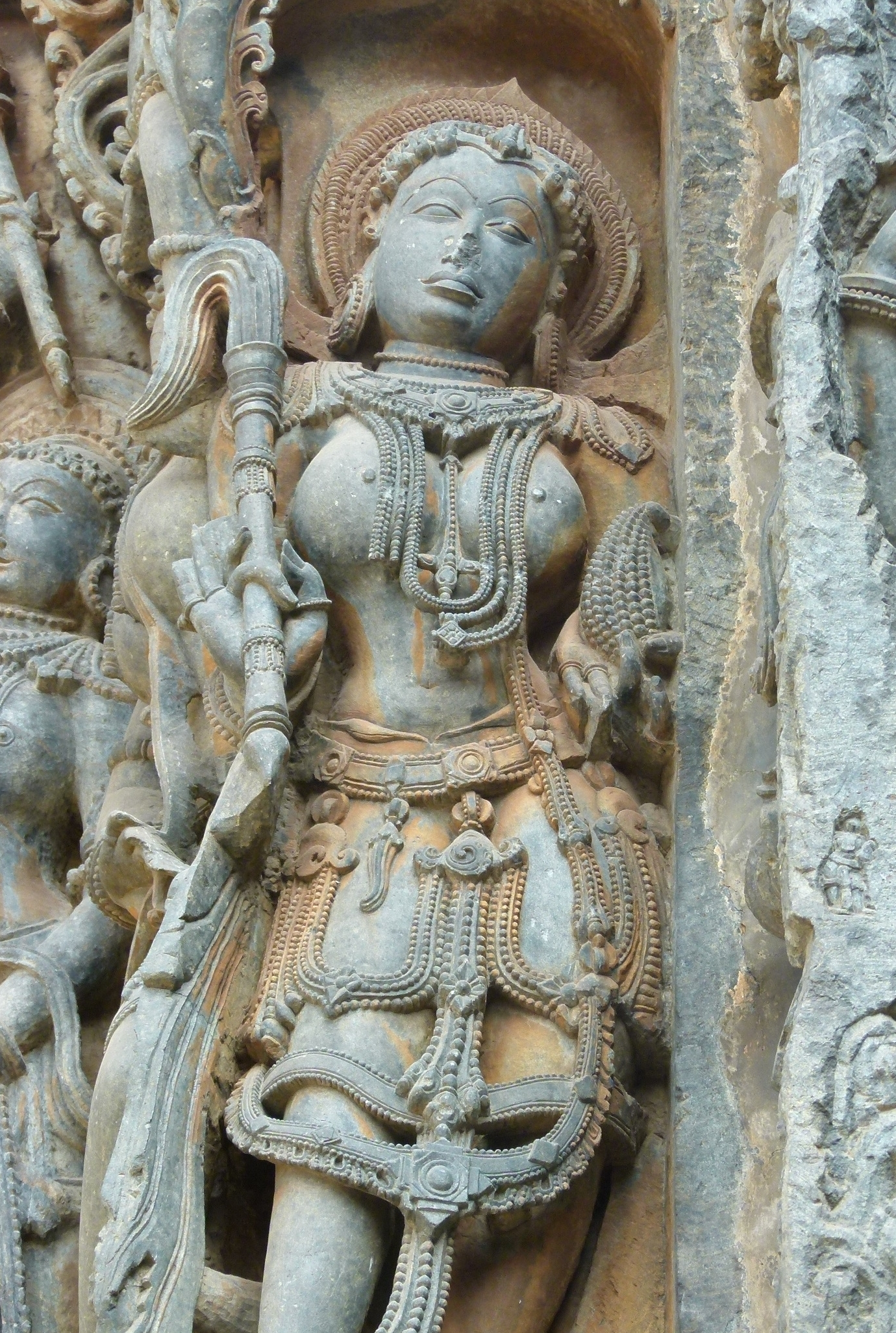
Attendant on Halebid outer wall holding maize-like muktaphala object

Geographers Carl L. Johannessen and Anne Z. Parker identify distinctive objects held by several figures at Hoysala temples, including those at Halebid, Somnathpur and Belur, as maize ears. They argue, controversially, that since maize is a New World crop that could only have been brought across the sea by humans, these sculptures are evidence of pre-Columbian contacts between India and the Americas.

Plant geneticists M.M. Payak and J.K.S. Sachan deny that these sculptures depict maize ears. Instead, they report that local archaeologists identify the objects as muktaphala (literally pearl-fruit), and that they interpret this as an imaginary fruit made of pearls. According to the Wisdom Library online Sanskrit dictionary, muktaphala can refer to a pearl per se, the custard apple, lavali (the west India gooseberry), a flower that occurs in Buddhist literature, or camphor, but it makes no mention of an imaginary fruit made of pearls.

Ethnobotanist and Indologist Shakti M. Gupta concurs with Johannessen and Parker that the objects in question are maize ears:

Different varieties of the corn cob [Zea mays Linn.] are extensively sculpted [...] on the Hindu and Jain temples of Karnataka. Various deities are shown as carrying a corn cob in their hands as on the Chenna Kesava temple, Belur. The straight rows of the corn grains can easily be identified. In the Lakshmi Narasimha temple, Nuggehalli, the eight-armed dancing Vishnu in his female form of Mohini is holding a corn cob in one of her left hands and the other hands hold the usual emblems of Vishnu. [...]

Temples where the corn cobs are found are dated 12-13th century A.D. [...] By the time these temples were constructed, maize would have been fairly common in India.

== Other monuments ==
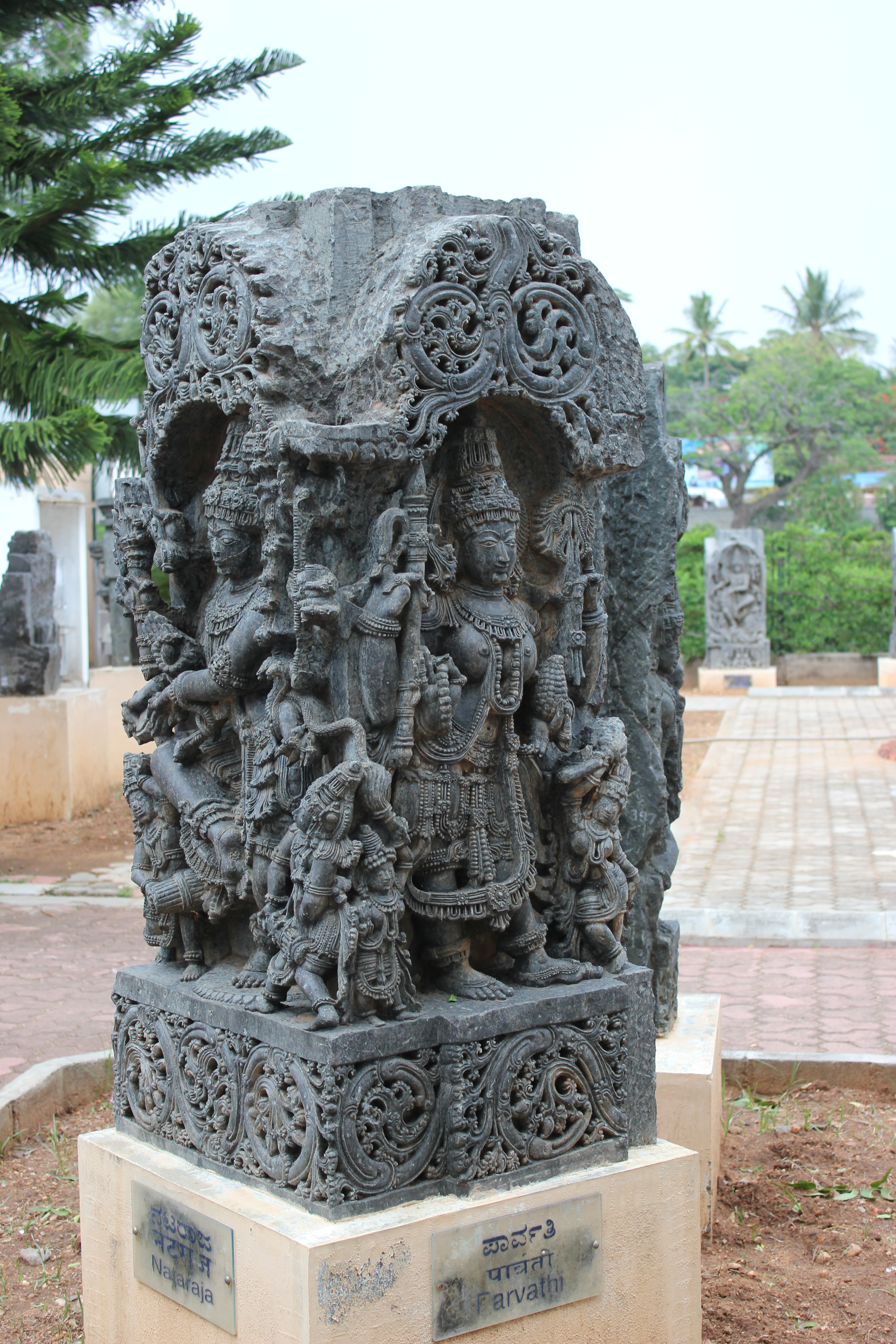
ASI museum in Halebidu with a display of artwork ruins.

The Hoysaleswara Temple premises include a museum managed by the Archaeological Survey of India. It contains numerous pieces of ruins and temple artwork recovered from the site for closer three dimensional examination. The temple premises also has the so-called Garuda Sthamba (Garuda pillar) to the south of the temple. It is also damaged, with its top portion gone. It contains an inscription that breaks off in the middle of the sentence. The part which can be read states that a general Lakshmana, his wife and followers sacrificed themselves after the death of Ballala II. In the middle of the pillar are eight male figures, four of whom are shown as using their swords to sacrifice themselves (siditale-godu). One of the sacrificer is shown seated in a namaste posture preparing for the sacrifice, while others are shown in the process of the sacrifice. The images represent the devotion of these to their leader and their determination to die with him.

The temple premises show evidence of other shrine and temples. Just like the Surya (Sun) monument that is to the east of one Nandi, there was a Chandra (Moon) monument attached to the other Nandi. Excavations on the southwest side of the temple revealed the remains of a destroyed temple.

== Artists ==
Numerous temple artwork panels contain signatures or statements by the artists or the guild they belonged to, and these are usually at the artwork's pedestal or underneath. The most repeated names of artists found at the Hoysaleswara temple include Manibalaki, Mabala, Ballana, Bochana, Ketana, Bama, Balaki and Revoja. The guilds can be identified by the organization's icon marked and names inscribed such as Agni-Indra, Indra, Paduca (.west) and Paduvala-badaga (.northwest).

== Reception ==
According to the 19th-century art critic James Fergusson, it is a "marvellous exhibition of human labor to be found even in the patient east and surpasses anything in Gothic art". The Hoysaleswara temple of Halebidu, has been described by Percy Brown as the "highest achievement of Hoysala architecture" and as the "supreme climax of Indian architecture" despite appearing rather flat and dull from distance given the towers are now missing.

Richard Oakley was among the early photographers who visited this temple in the 1850s. He called it "most gorgeous" and "far surpasses" any South Indian temple he had seen:

I was strongly recommended by my old friend, Dr. Neill, of the 1st Madras Light Cavalry, to visit Hallibeede, the site of Dhoor Summooder, the ancient Capital of Bellal Deo, the Sovereign of the Carnatic. I was told of a wonderful temple said to exist there, but very few of the many from whom I sought information, knew anything about it, and it was with very great difficulty, and after a march of some twenty days along the most miserable cross country roads conceivable, that I succeeded in finding this splendid Temple. Having seen a great number of the most celebrated Pagodas in the South of India, I can unhesitatingly assert, it far surpasses any, even the most gorgeous of these beautiful structures . . .. Having a Photographic Apparatus with me, I lost no time in committing to waxed paper faithful representations of almost every portion of the sculpture, which literally covers its walls.!

— Richard Banner Oakley (1856), Quoted by Janet Dewan

James Fergusson never visited this temple or Halebid, but he was the first to review all available field notes on Hoysalesvara temple after he had retired and returned to England. He focused exclusively on the Hoysalesvara temple, published a brief art-historical review in 1866, followed by a more complete analysis in 1876. He wrote:

If it were possible to illustrate the Halebid temple to such an extent as to render its peculiarities familiar there would be few things more interesting or more instructive than to institute a comparison with the Parthenon at Athens. (...) [The Halebid temple] is regular, but with a studied variety of outline in plan, and even greater variety in detail. All the pillars in the Parthenon are identical, while no facets of the Indian temple are the same; every convolution of every scroll is different. No two canopies in the whole building are alike, and every part exhibits a joyous exuberance of fancy scorning every mechanical restraint. All that is wild in human faith or warm in human feeling is found portrayed in these walls; but of pure intellect there is little – less than there is human feeling in the Parthenon.

— James Fergusson (1876), Quoted by Adam Hardy

According to Kristen Kasdorf, Fergusson's publications on Indian architecture have been influential, served as the introductory foundation to several generations of scholars. His exclusive focus on this temple helped bring attention to it, but without the context of other Halebid temples. Fergusson erred in many details including his wrong guess that Hoysalas started building the Hoysalesvara temple in 1235, continued working on it over 85 years and stopped construction due to the "Mahomedan invasion" of 1310. Fergusson's error was copied in many Indian texts for a while. A more correct history emerged as more inscriptions were discovered and translated by scholars. His commentary on the Hoysalesvara temple, states Kadorf, expresses admiration yet "falls squarely within the purview of the prevailing imperialist narrative" where the Western monuments were portrayed as "rational" while the Eastern monuments called as "chaotic", "emotional and excess reigning over serious measured judgment". Fergusson's reception of the Hoysalesvara temple was often quoted at length for nearly a century, and continues to be quoted for the Western audience without the necessary context.

In the 20th-century, Indian authors such as Narasimachar and Srikantaiya published their monographs, calling it as one of the temples that realised the "magnificence of the Hoysala art". Krishna – one of the directors of Mysore Archaeological department under the Wodeyars, wrote his 1930 annual report – which remains the most thorough report on the site to date. The temple should compared to jewelry, and not other temples, wrote Krishna, with reliefs and sculptures of "high class possessing beauty of ideas and art".

== Gallery ==
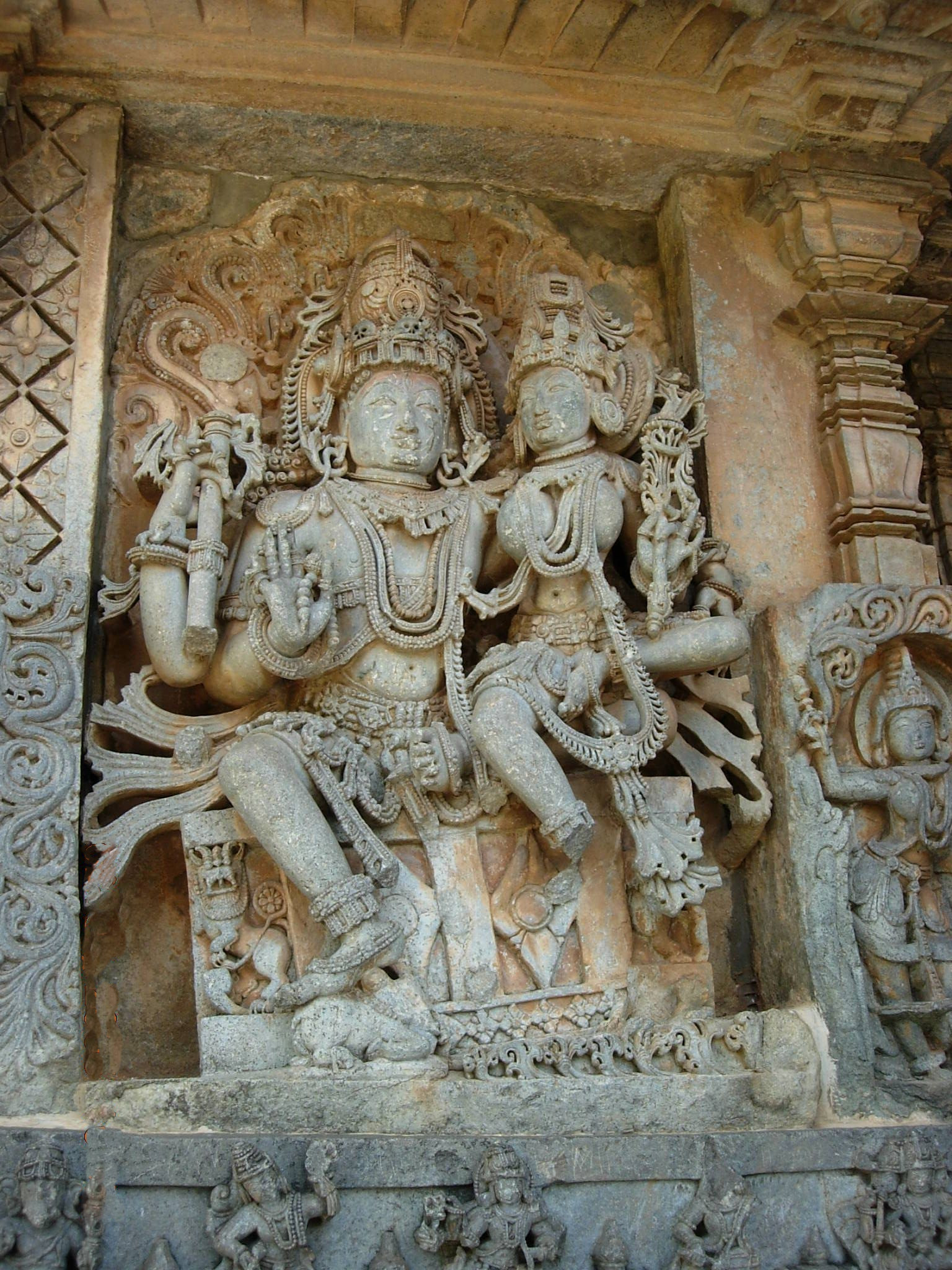
Shiva and Parvathi relief at Hoysaleswara temple

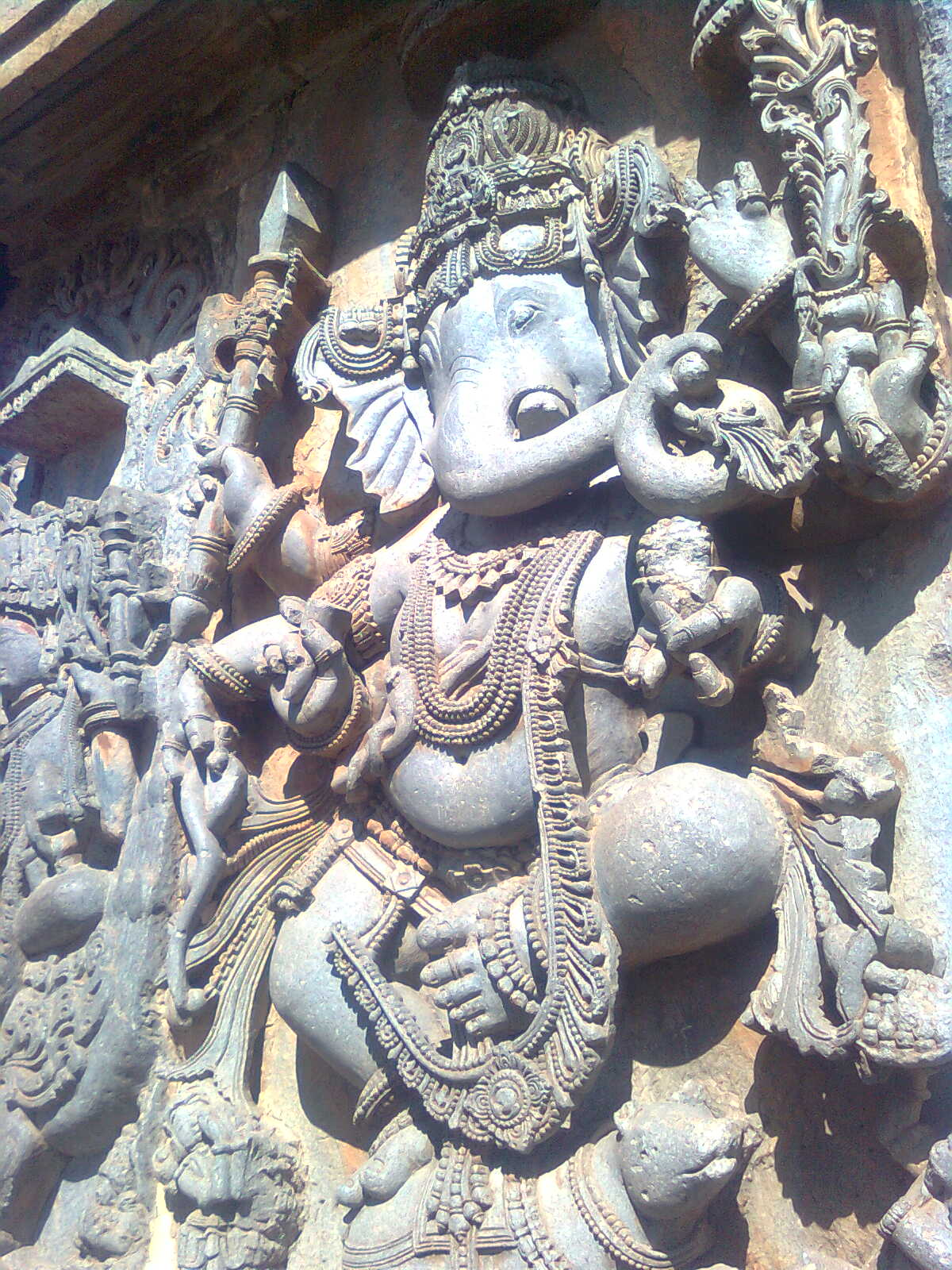
Ganesha relief

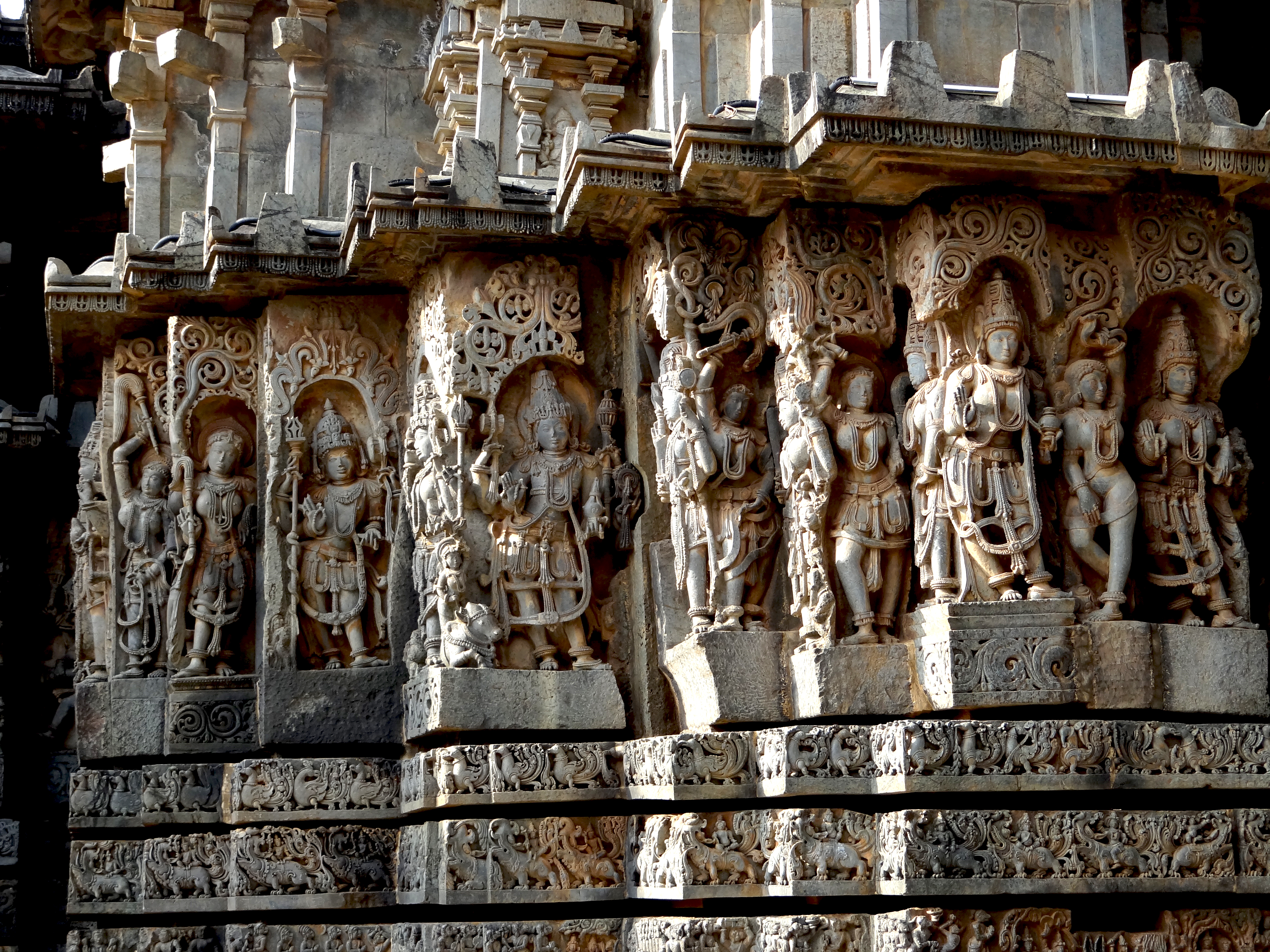
Outer wall relief

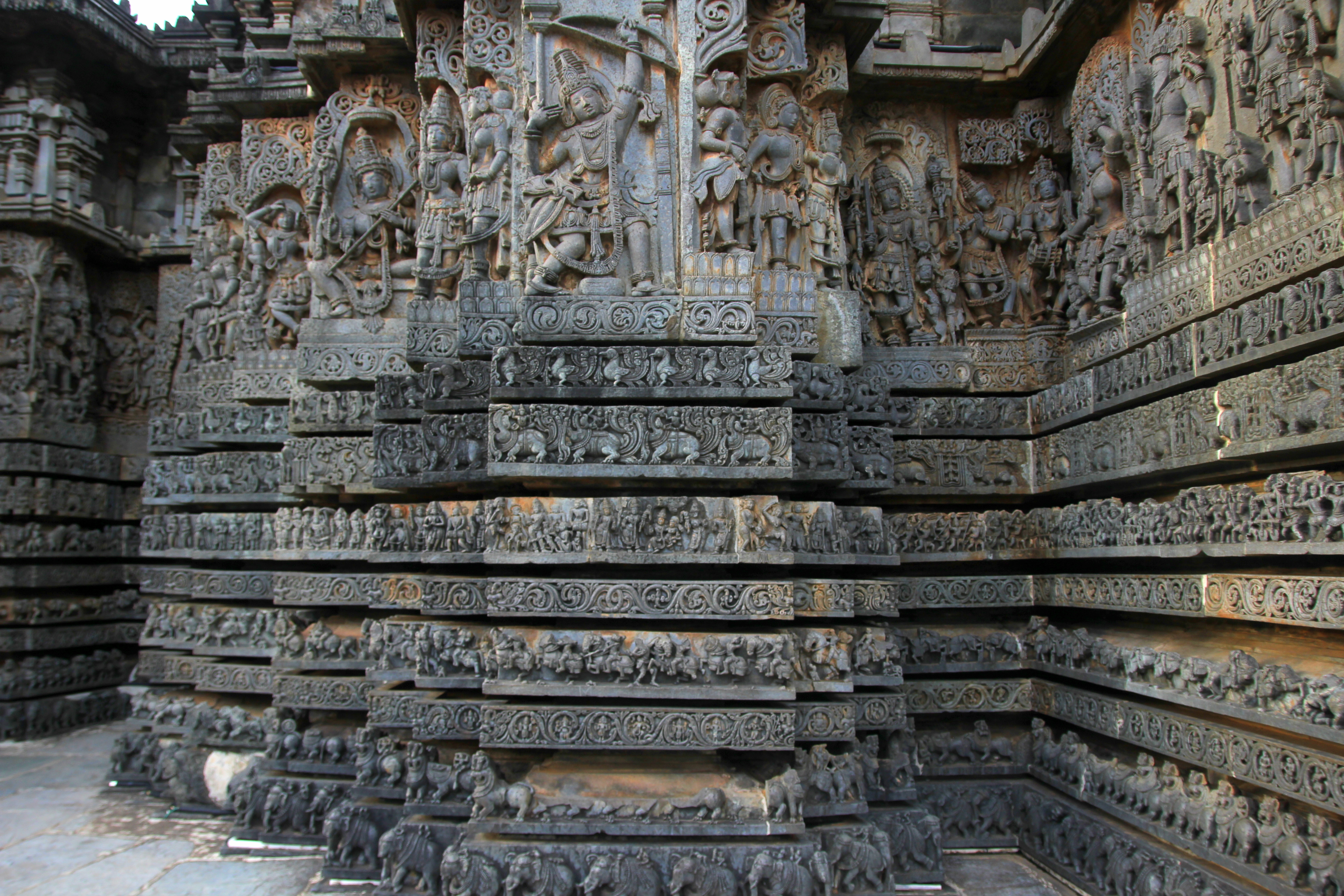
Outer wall bands with friezes

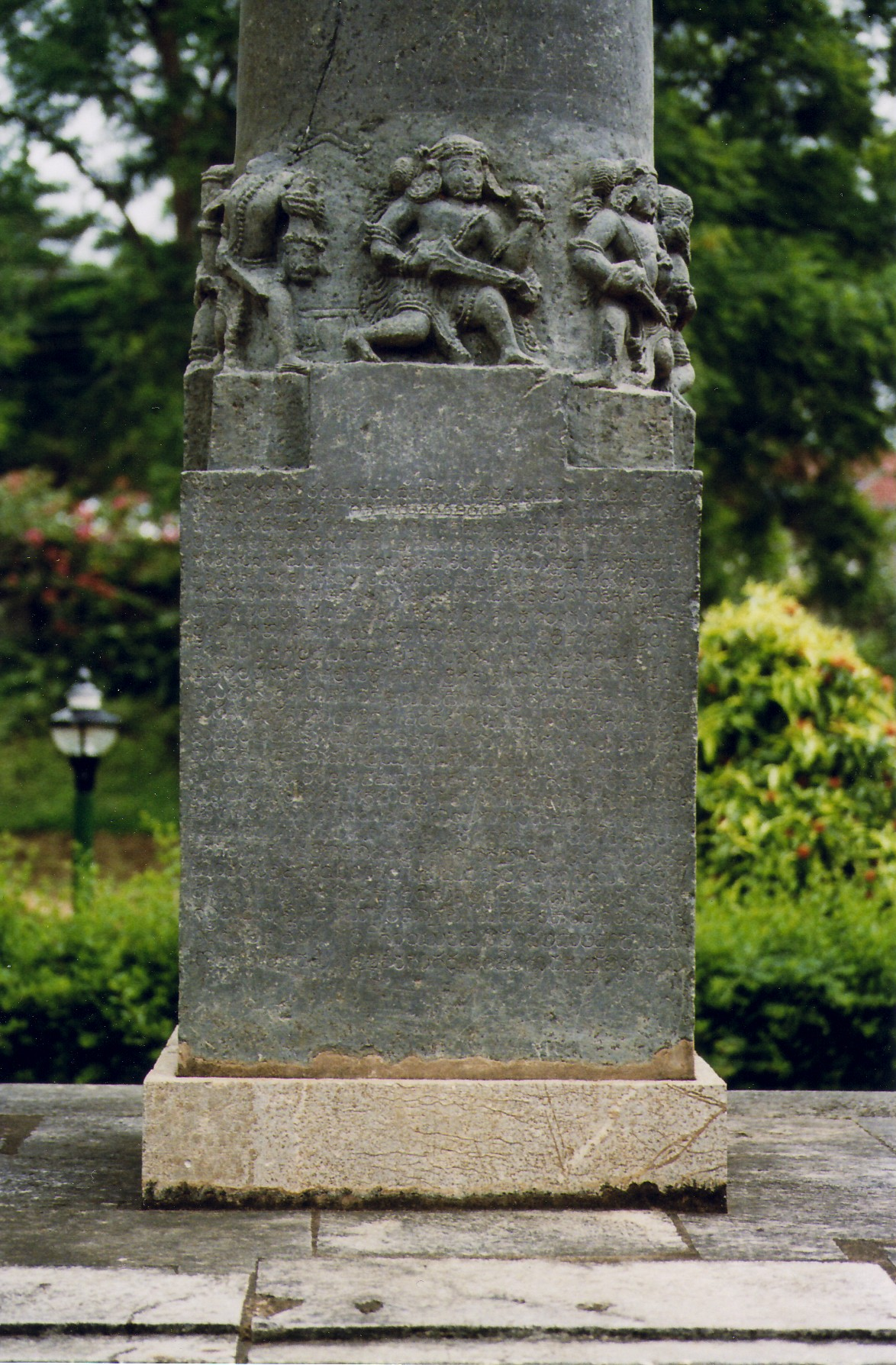
Garuda pillar

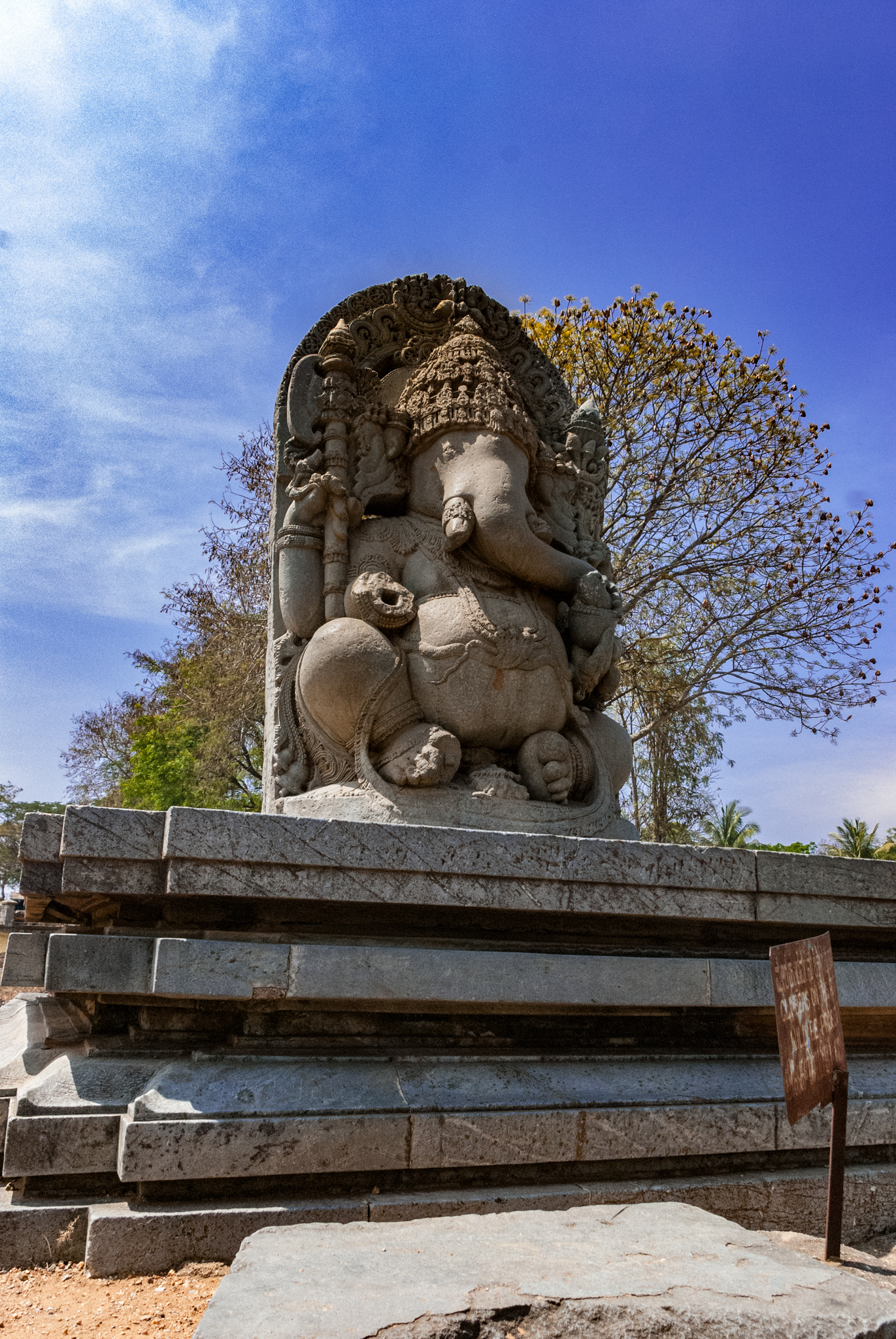
Hindu god Ganesha - western entrance

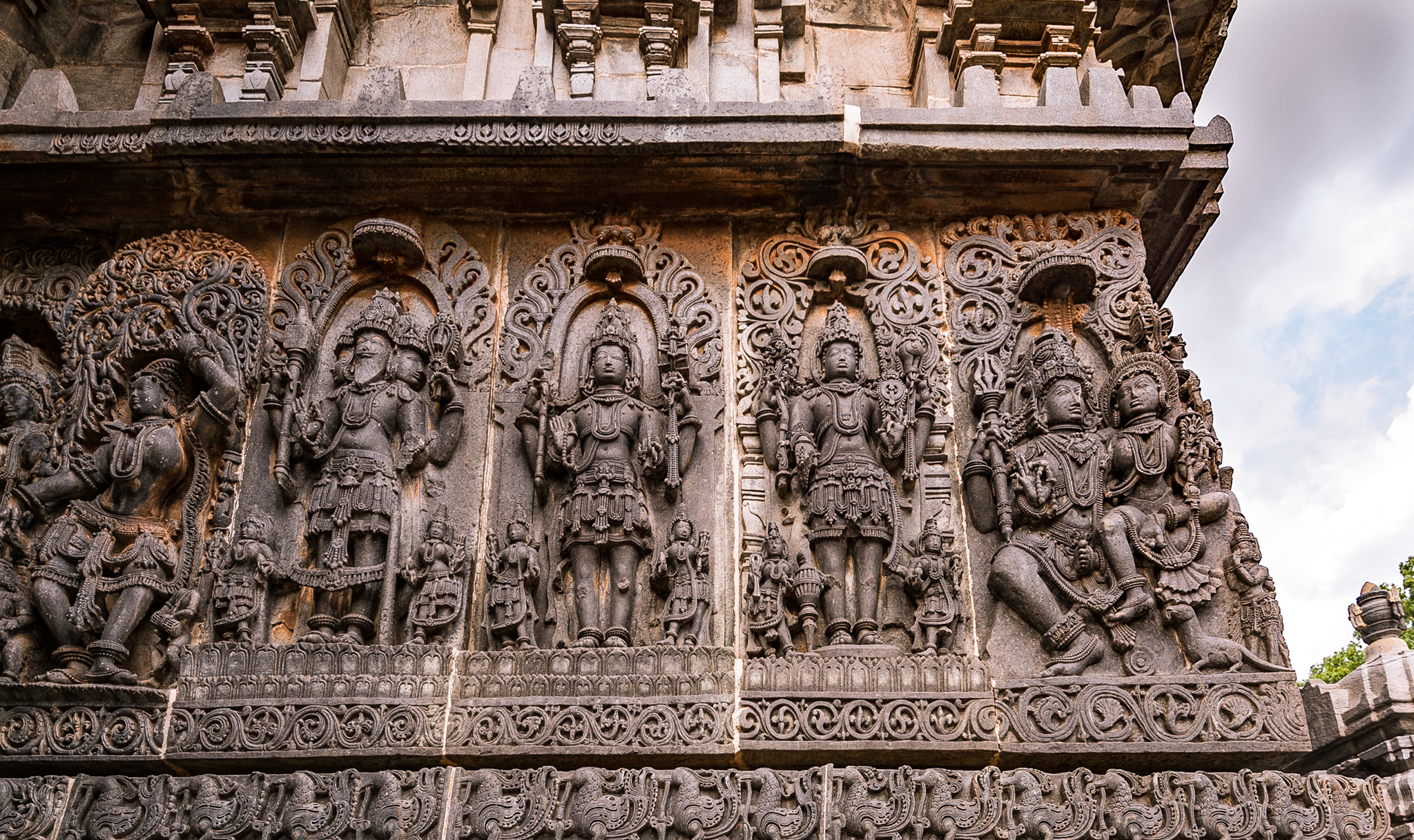
Reliefs

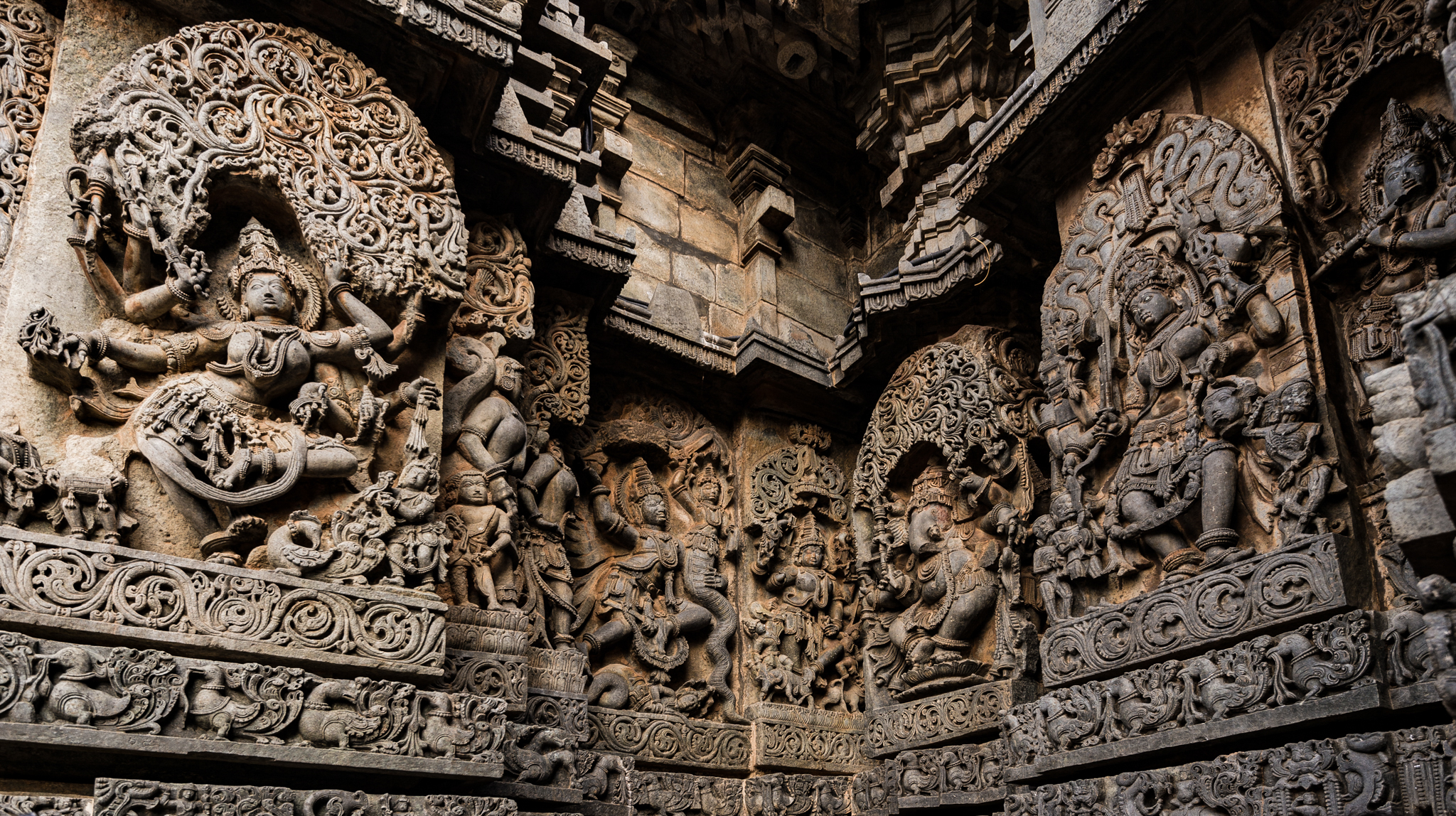
Exterior wall reliefs on Shantaleshwara shrine

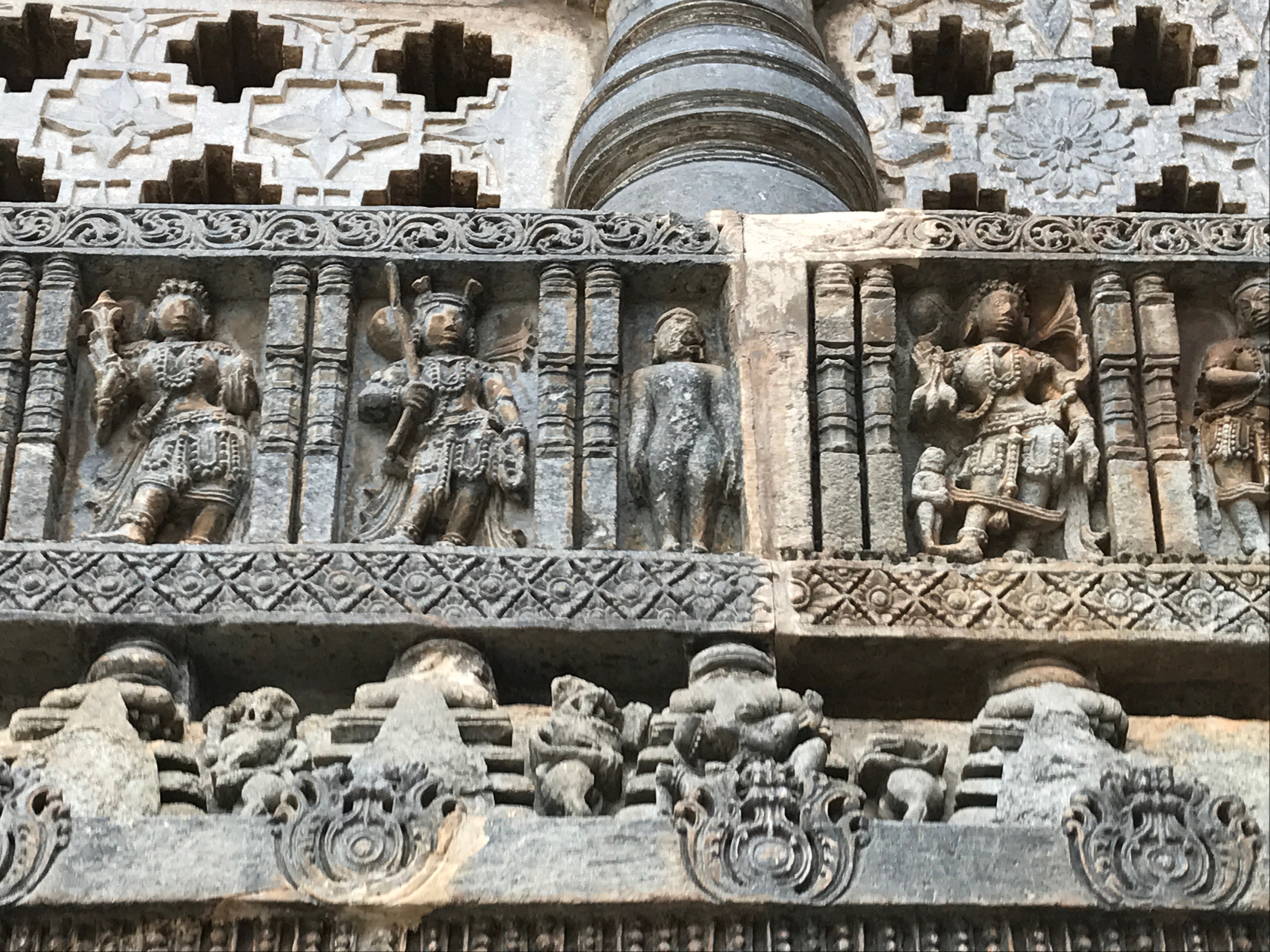
Jain iconography on the outer wall

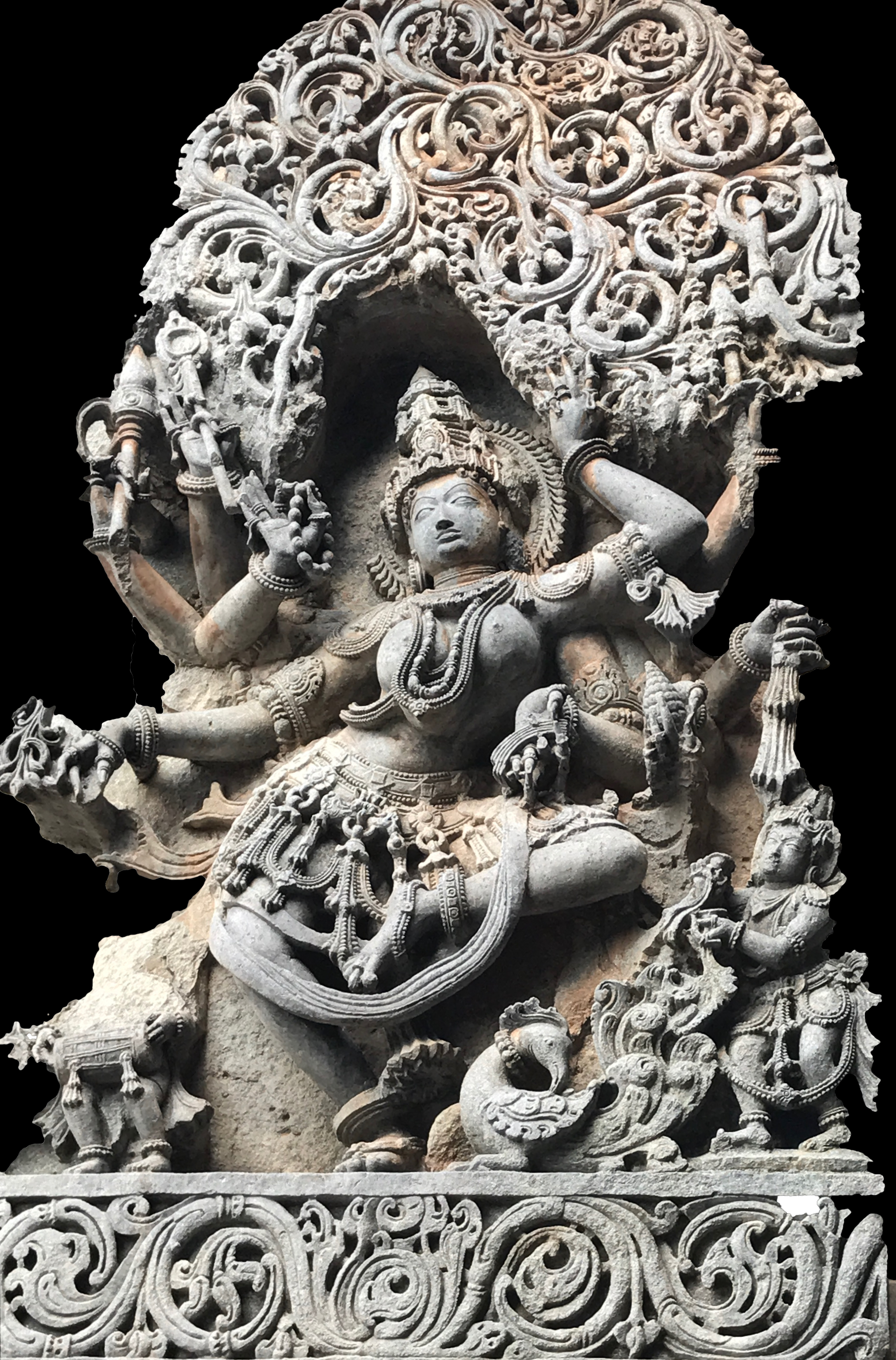
Dancing Saraswati

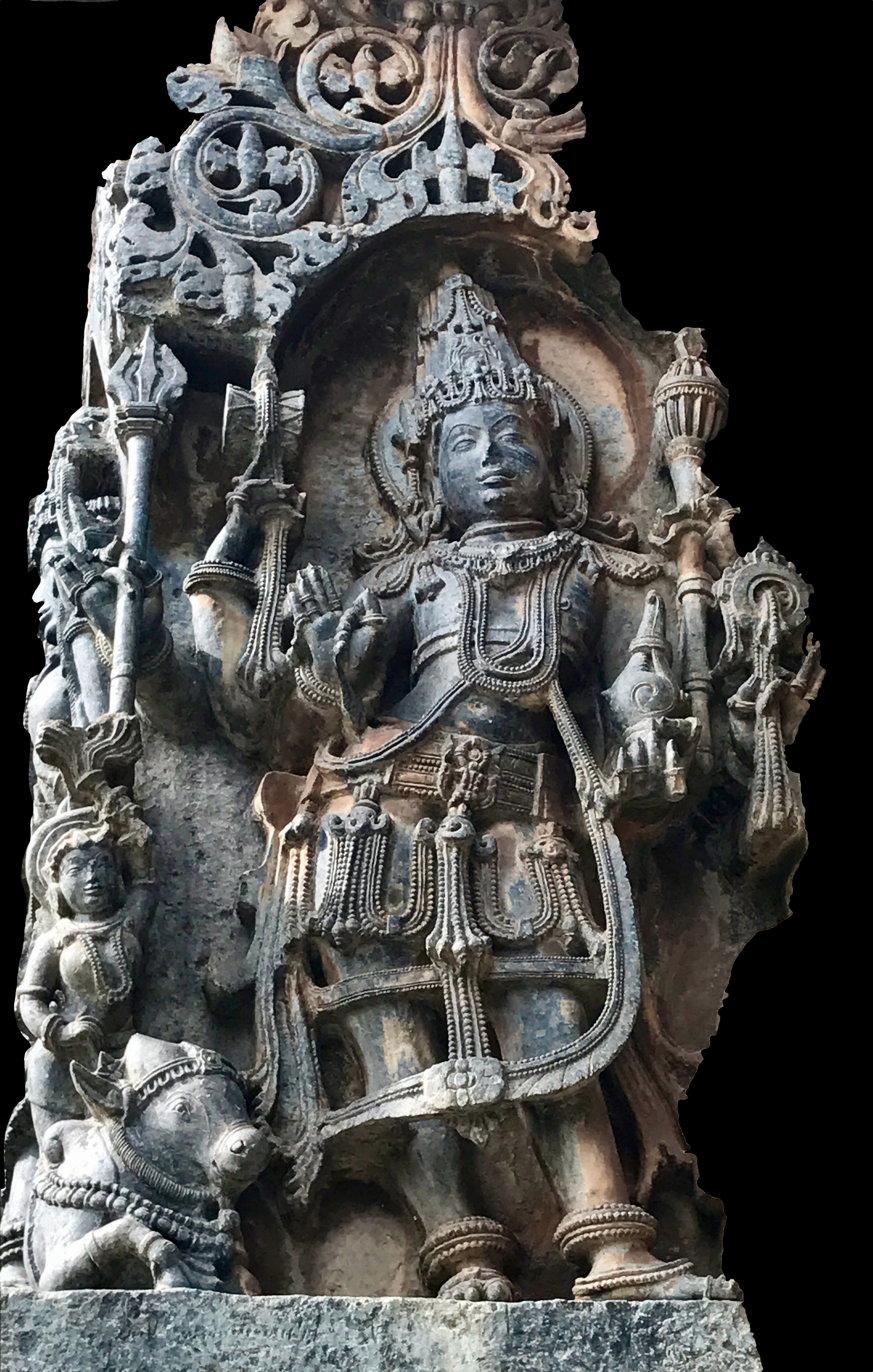
Harihara – half Shiva, half Vishnu

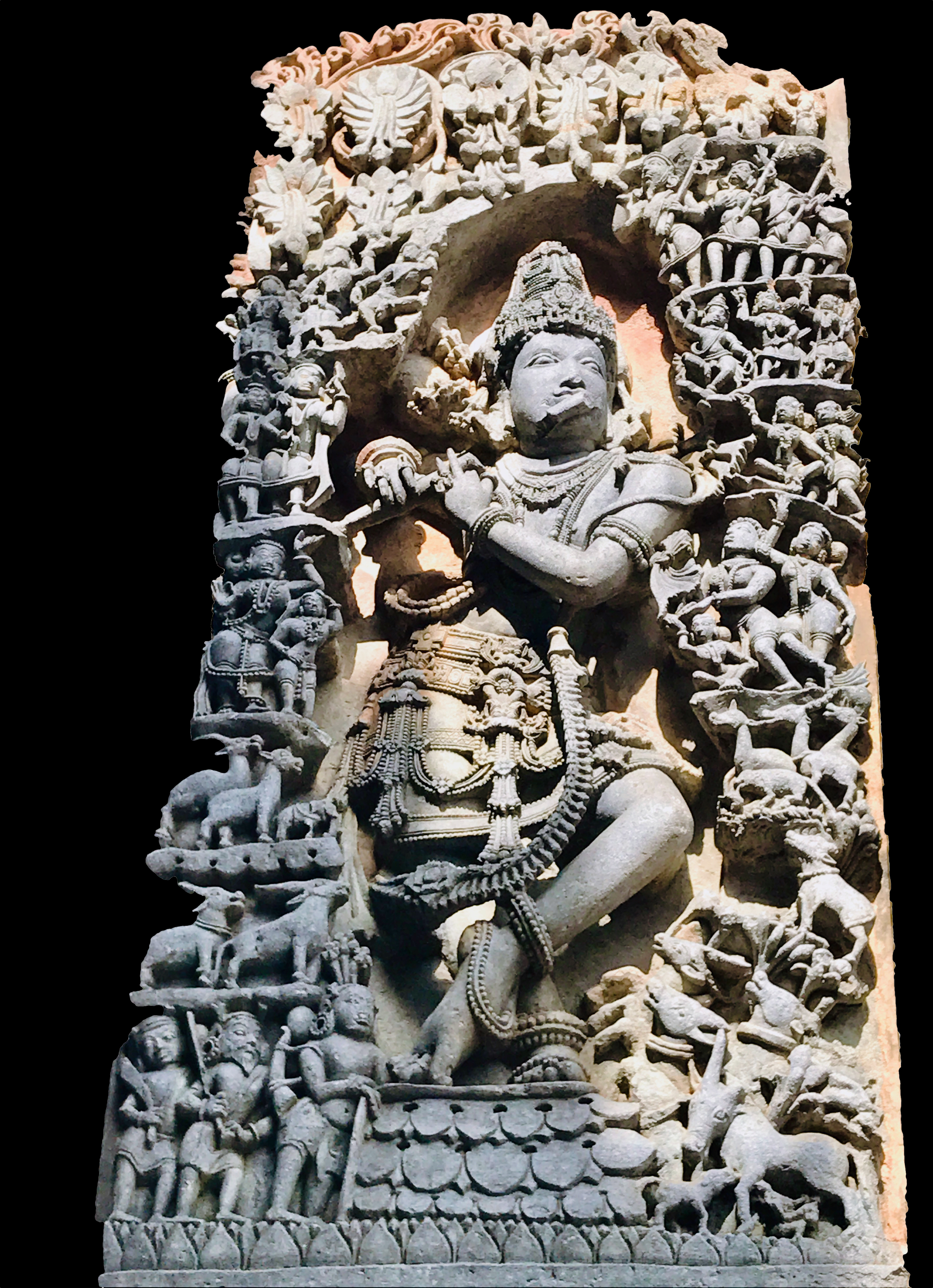
Krishna with flute

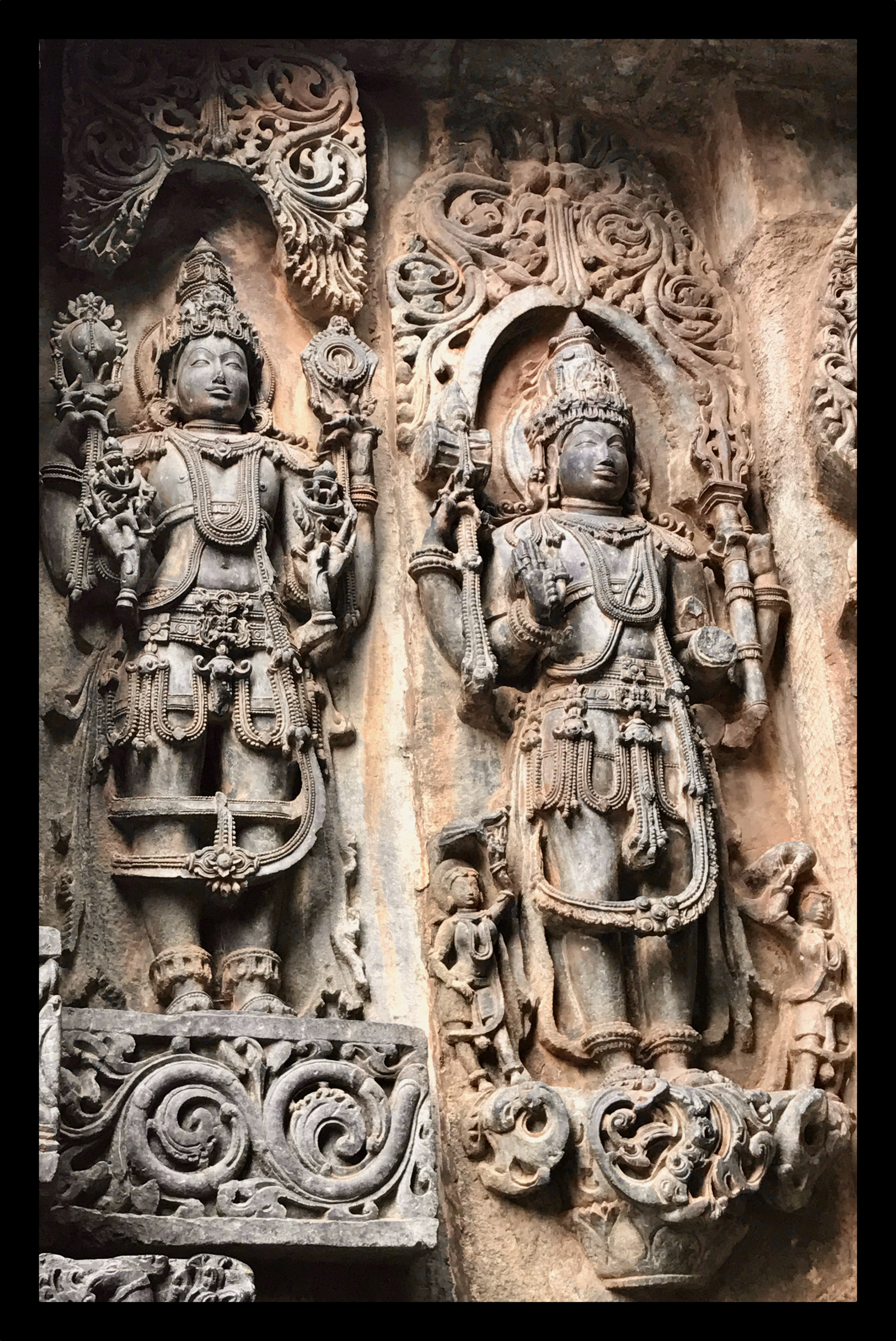
Suryanarayana and Shiva

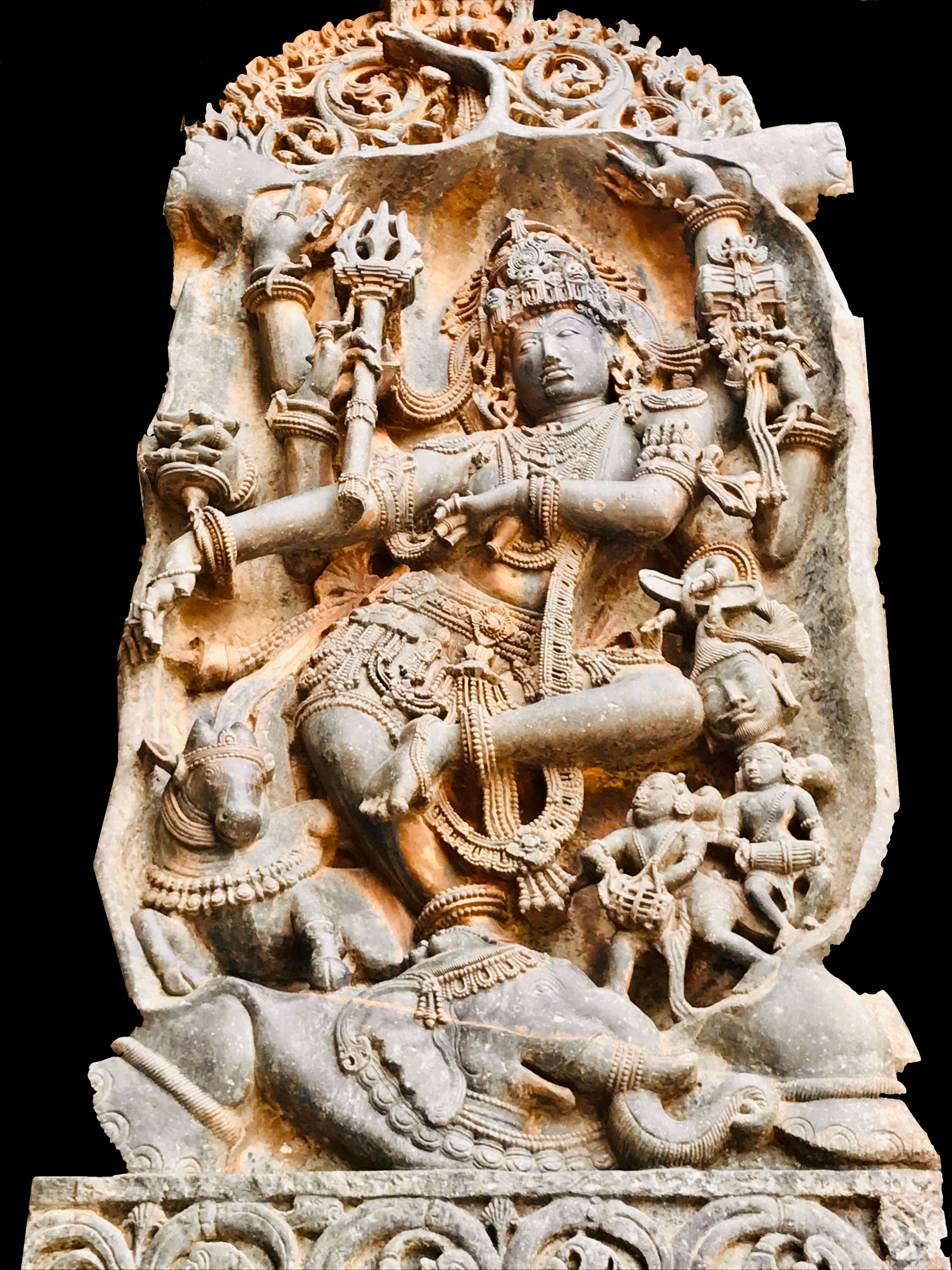
Shiva as Gajasurasamhara

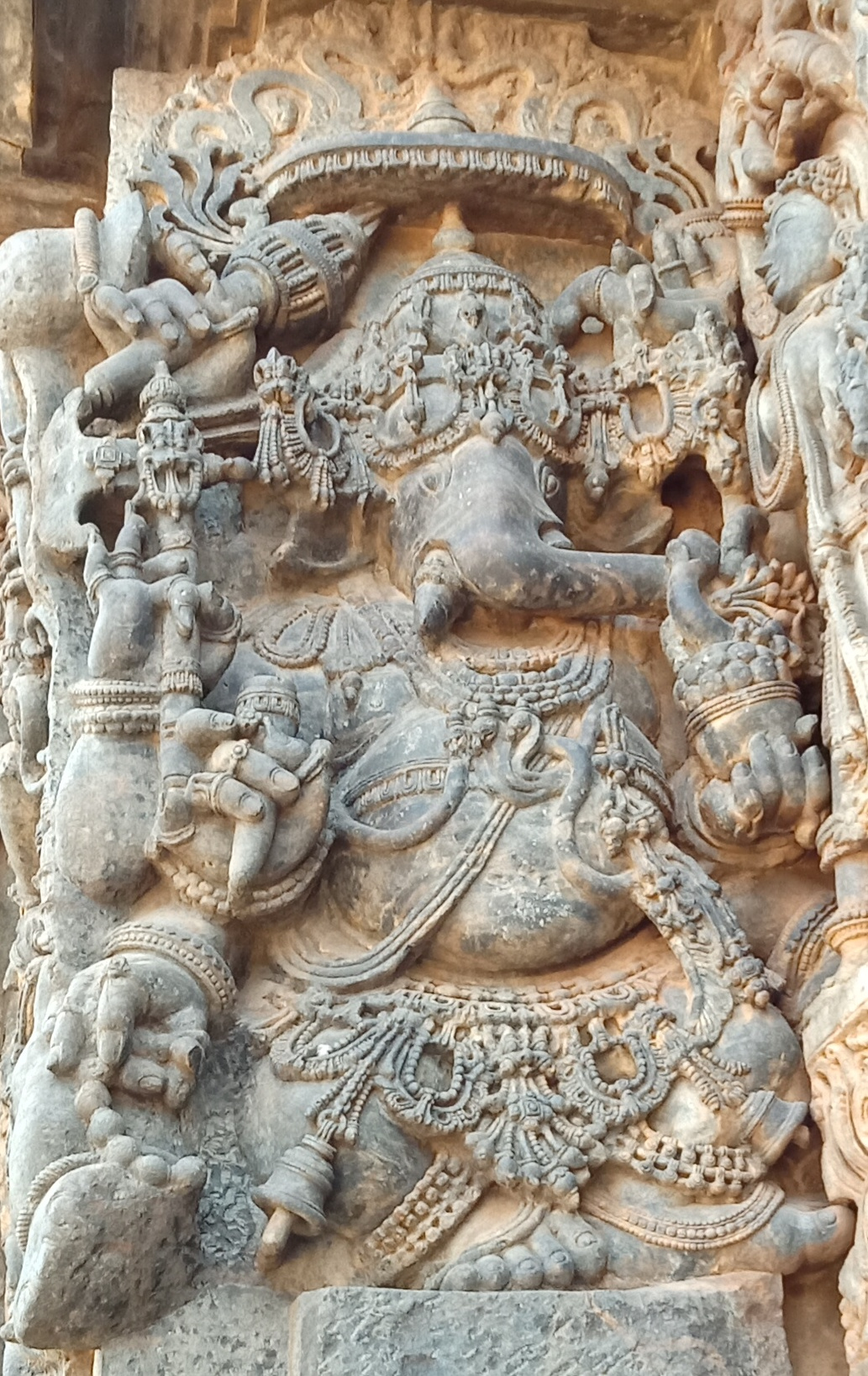
Ganesha on outer walls

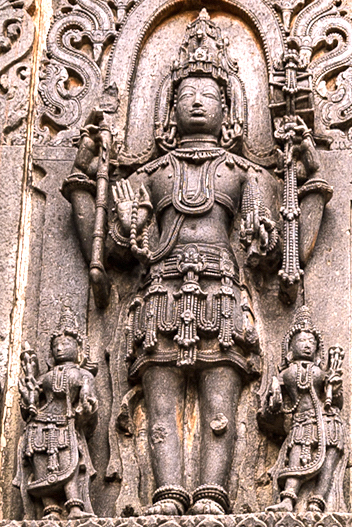
Shiva holding maize-like muktaphala object

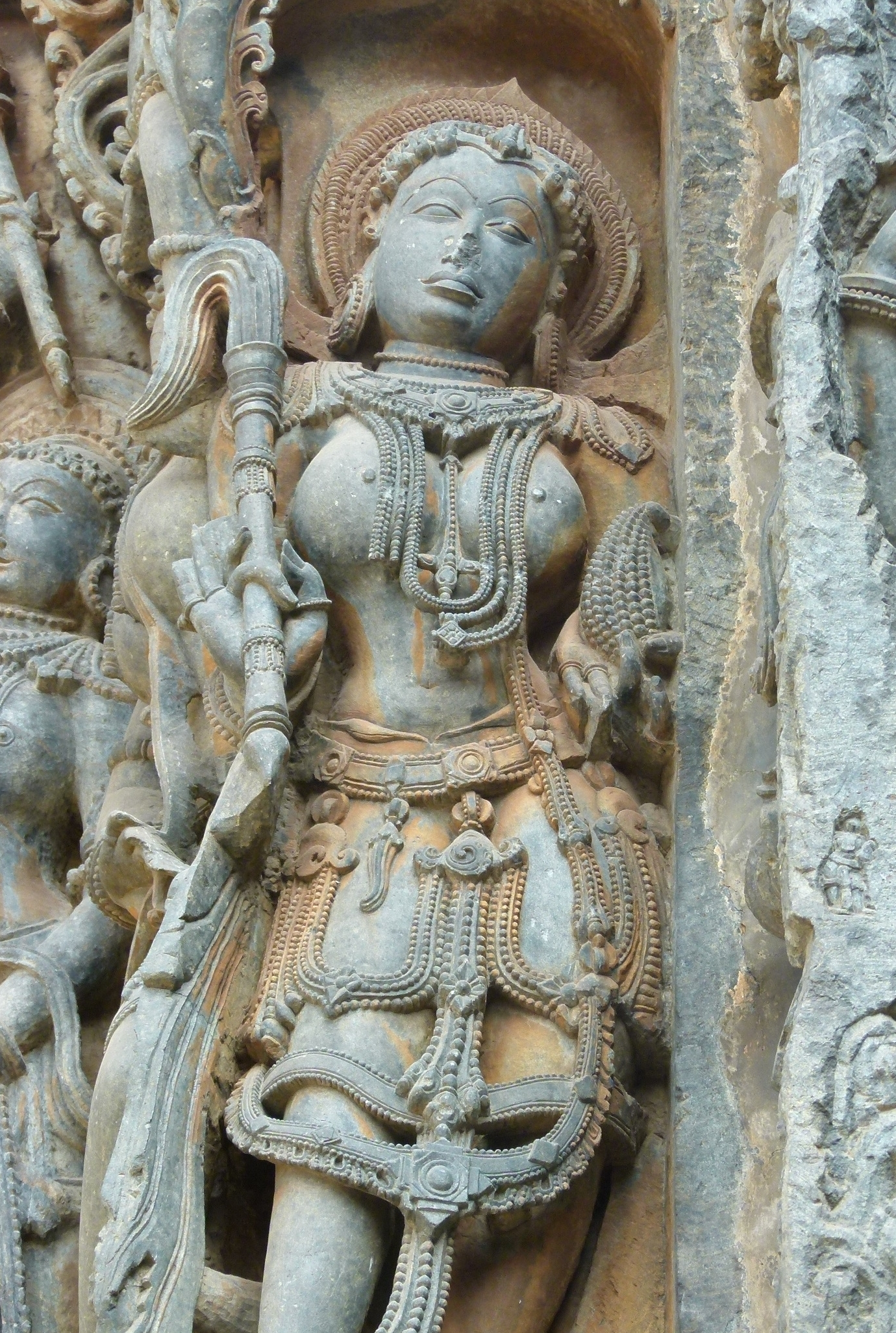
Attendant holding maize-like muktaphala object

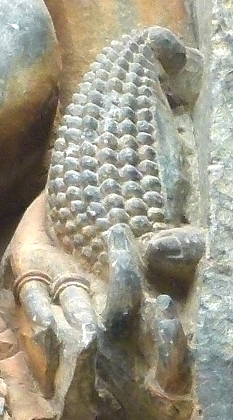
Detail of maize-like object in Halebid Muktaphala 19.jpg

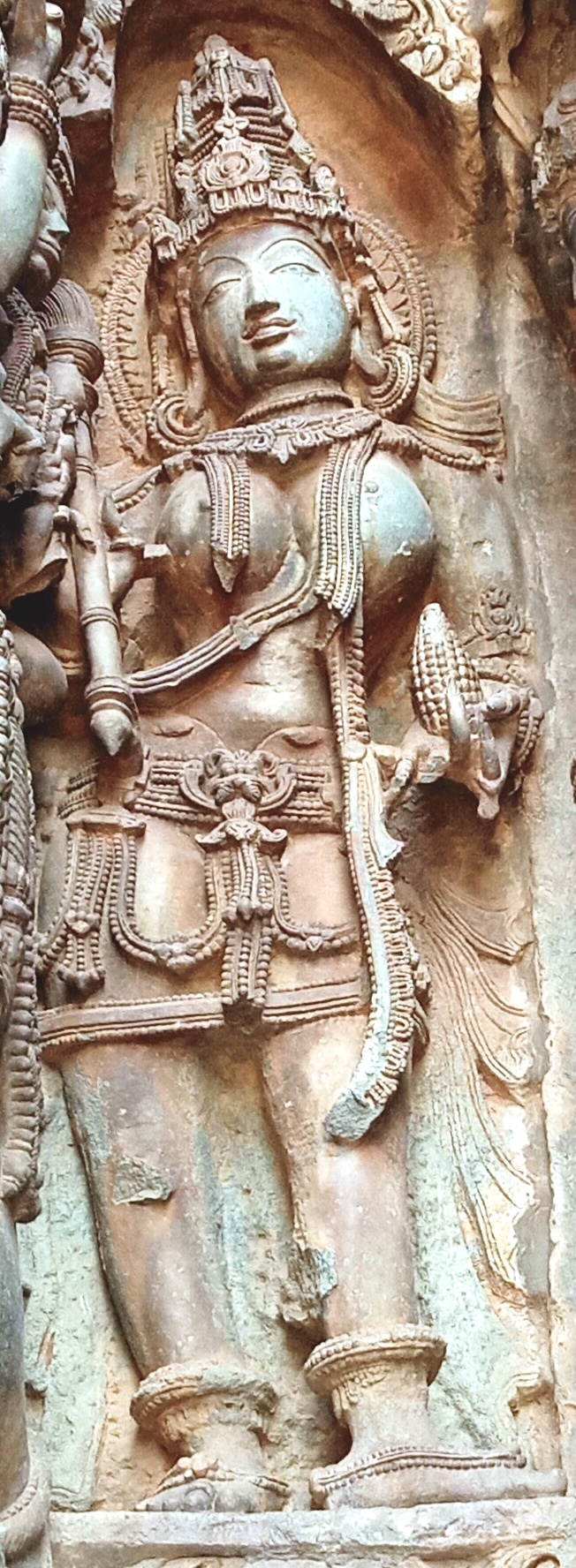
Attendant holding maize-like muktaphala object (2)

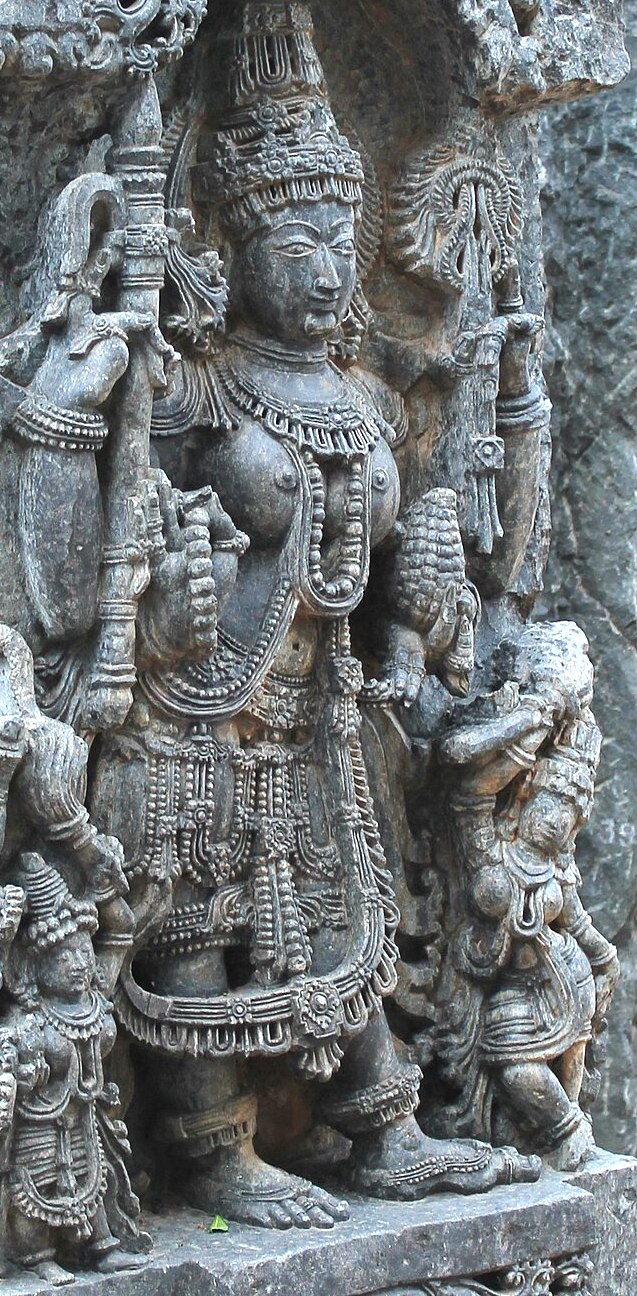
Parvati holding maize-like muktaphala object, ASI Museum, Halebidu

== See also ==
- Hoysala architecture
- Jain temples, Halebidu
- Chennakeshava Temple, Belur
- Chennakesava Temple at Somanathapura

== Bibliography ==
- Prasanna Kumar Acharya (2010). An encyclopaedia of Hindu architecture. Oxford University Press (Republished by Motilal Banarsidass). ISBN 978-81-7536-534-6.
- Prasanna Kumar Acharya (1997). A Dictionary of Hindu Architecture: Treating of Sanskrit Architectural Terms with Illustrative Quotations. Oxford University Press (Reprinted in 1997 by Motilal Banarsidass). ISBN 978-81-7536-113-3.
- Vinayak Bharne; Krupali Krusche (2014). Rediscovering the Hindu Temple: The Sacred Architecture and Urbanism of India. Cambridge Scholars Publishing. ISBN 978-1-4438-6734-4.
- Alice Boner (1990). Principles of Composition in Hindu Sculpture: Cave Temple Period. Motilal Banarsidass. ISBN 978-81-208-0705-1.
- Brown, Percy (1949). Indian Architecture. D.B. Taraporevala.
- Alice Boner; Sadāśiva Rath Śarmā (2005). Silpa Prakasa. Brill Academic (Reprinted by Motilal Banarsidass). ISBN 978-8120820524.
- A.K. Coomaraswamy; Michael W. Meister (1995). Essays in Architectural Theory. Indira Gandhi National Centre for the Arts. ISBN 978-0-19-563805-9.
- Dehejia, V. (1997). Indian Art. Phaidon: London. ISBN 0-7148-3496-3.
- Dewan, Janet (1989). "The Hoysalesvara temple of Halebid in early photography". History of Photography. 13 (4): 343–354. doi:10.1080/03087298.1989.10441009.
- Gupta, Shakti M. (1996). Plants in Indian Temple Art. B.R. Publishing Corp. ISBN 81-7018-883-0.
- Adam Hardy (1995). Indian Temple Architecture: Form and Transformation. Abhinav Publications. ISBN 978-81-7017-312-0.
- Adam Hardy (2007). The Temple Architecture of India. Wiley. ISBN 978-0470028278.
- Adam Hardy (2015). Theory and Practice of Temple Architecture in Medieval India: Bhoja's Samarāṅgaṇasūtradhāra and the Bhojpur Line Drawings. Indira Gandhi National Centre for the Arts. ISBN 978-93-81406-41-0.
- Harle, J.C., The Art and Architecture of the Indian Subcontinent, 2nd edn. 1994, Yale University Press Pelican History of Art, ISBN 0300062176
- Johannessen, Carl L.; Parker, Anne Z. (1989). "Maize ears sculpted in 12th and 13th century A.D. India as indicators of pre-Columbian diffusion". Economic Botany. 43: 164–80.
- Monica Juneja (2001). Architecture in Medieval India: Forms, Contexts, Histories. Orient Blackswan. ISBN 978-8178242286.
- Stella Kramrisch (1976). The Hindu Temple Volume 1. Motilal Banarsidass (Reprinted 1946 Princeton University Press). ISBN 978-81-208-0223-0.
- Stella Kramrisch (1979). The Hindu Temple Volume 2. Motilal Banarsidass (Reprinted 1946 Princeton University Press). ISBN 978-81-208-0224-7.
- Michael W. Meister; Madhusudan Dhaky (1986). Encyclopaedia of Indian temple architecture. American Institute of Indian Studies. ISBN 978-0-8122-7992-4.
- George Michell (1988). The Hindu Temple: An Introduction to Its Meaning and Forms. University of Chicago Press. ISBN 978-0-226-53230-1.
- George Michell (2000). Hindu Art and Architecture. Thames & Hudson. ISBN 978-0-500-20337-8.
- Kamath, U. Suryanath: A Concise History of Karnataka from pre-historic times to the present, Jupiter books, 2001, MCC, Bangalore (Reprinted 2002), OCLC 7796041.
- Sastri, Nilakanta K.A.: A History of South India, (1955), From Prehistoric times to fall of Vijayanagar, OUP, New Delhi (Reprinted 2002), ISBN 0-19-560686-8.
- Gerard Foekema (1996). A Complete Guide to Hoysaḷa Temples. Abhinav Publications. ISBN 978-81-7017-345-8.
- Kirsti Evans (1997). Epic Narratives in the Hoysaḷa Temples: The Rāmāyaṇa, Mahābhārata, and Bhāgavata Purāṇa in Haḷebīd, Belūr, and Amṛtapura. BRILL. ISBN 90-04-10575-1.
- Hardy, Adam (1995). Indian Temple Architecture: Form and Transformation-The Karnata Dravida Tradition 7th to 13th Centuries. Abhinav Publications. ISBN 81-7017-312-4.
- Krishna, M.H. (1971). Halebid: Hoysalesvara Temple. Mysore Archaeological Department, University of Mysore (Orig-year: 1930).
- Narasimhacharya, Ramanujapuram (1990). Halebid temple (pages 6-10) of Mysore Archaeological Report, vol. 1911. Asiatic Society (Orig year 1911).
- Payak, M.M.; Sachan, J.K.S. (1993). "Maize ears not sculptured in 13th century Somnathpur temple in India". Economic Botany. 47 (2): 202–5.
- T. A. Gopinatha Rao (1993). Elements of Hindu iconography. Motilal Banarsidass. ISBN 978-81-208-0878-2.
- Ajay J. Sinha (2000). Imagining Architects: Creativity in the Religious Monuments of India. University of Delaware Press. ISBN 978-0-87413-684-5.
- Burton Stein (1978). South Indian Temples. Vikas. ISBN 978-0706904499.
- Katherine Kasdorf (2013). Forming Dōrasamudra: Temples of the Hoysaḷa Capital in Context. Columbia University Press.
- Burton Stein (1989). The New Cambridge History of India: Vijayanagara. Cambridge University Press. ISBN 978-0-521-26693-2.
- Burton Stein; David Arnold (2010). A History of India. John Wiley & Sons. ISBN 978-1-4443-2351-1.
- Kapila Vatsyayan (1997). The Square and the Circle of the Indian Arts. Abhinav Publications. ISBN 978-81-7017-362-5.
- Wisdom Library. "wisdomlib.org, s.v. muktaphala".
