= List of Hoysala temples =

The temples built by the Hoysala Empire during the period of their ascendancy (1113-1286 C.E.) are included in the table below. These constructions incorporate many of the artistic features usually associated with Hoysala architecture.

Name	Location	District	Period	Deity
Lakshmidevi	Doddagaddavalli		1113	Lakshmi
Chennakesava	Belur		1117	Vishnu
Hoysaleswara	Halebidu		1120	Shiva
Basadi complex	Halebidu		1133, 1196	Parshvanatha, Shantinatha, Adinatha
Bhandara Basadi	Shravanabelagola		1159	Tirthankara
Rameshvara	Koodli		12th c.	Shiva
Brahmeshwara	Kikkeri		1171	Shiva
Bucheshvara	Koravangala		1173	Shiva
Akkana Basadi	Shravanabelagola		1181	Parshvanatha
Amruteshwara	Amruthapura		1196	Shiva
Shantinatha Basadi	Jinanathapura		1200	Shantinatha
Nageshvara-Chennakeshava	Mosale		1200	Shiva, Vishnu
Veeranarayana	Belavadi		1200	Vishnu
Kedareshwara	Halebidu		1200	Shiva
Ishvara (Shiva)	Arsikere		1220	Shiva
Harihareshwara	Harihar		1224	Shiva, Vishnu
Mallikarjuna	Basaralu		1234	Shiva
Someshvara	Haranhalli		1235	Shiva
Lakshminarasimha	Haranhalli		1235	Vishnu
Panchalingeshwara	Govindanhalli		1238	Shiva
Lakshminarasimha	Nuggehalli		1246	Vishnu
Sadashiva	Nuggehalli		1249	Shiva
Lakshminarayana	Hosaholalu		1250	Vishnu
Lakshminarasimha	Javagallu		1250	Vishnu
Chennakesava	Aralaguppe		1250	Vishnu
Kesava	Somanathapura		1268	Vishnu
Lakshminarasimha	Adagur	Hassan	1100	Vishnu
Kirtinarayana	Talakad	Mysore	1117	Vishnu
Chennakeshava	Anekere	Hassan	1119	Vishnu
Narayanaswamy	Aane Kannambadi	Hassan	1120	Vishnu
Keshava-Ishvara	Marle	Chikkamagalur	1120	Vishnu, Shiva
Chennakeshava	Honnavara	Hassan	1149	Vishnu
Chennakeshava	Hullekere	Hassan	1163	Vishnu
Chennakeshava, Rameshvara	Arakere	Hassan	12th c.	Vishnu, Shiva
Trimrthi Narayana	Bandalike	Shimoga	1200	Vishnu
Chatteshvara	Chachattnahalli	Hassan	1200	Shiva
Chennakeshava, Kedareshvara	Nagalapura	Tumkur	1200	Vishnu, Shiva
Yoga Narasimha	Baggavalli	Chikkamagaluru	12th-13th c.	Vishnu
Mallikarjuna	Hirenallur	Chikkamagaluru	12th-13th c.	Shiva
Chennakeshava	Channarayapatna	Hassan	12th-13th c.	Vishnu
Someshvara	Kabli	Chikkamagalur	12th-13th c.	Shiva
Chennakeshava	Tandaga	Tumkur	12th-13th c.	Vishnu
Mahalingeshwara	Santebachalli	Mandya	12th-13th c.	Shiva
Betteshvara or Keshaveshwara	Agrahara Beluguli	Hassan	1209	Shiva & Vishnu
Suryanarayana	Magala	Bellary	1215	Vishnu
Moole Shankareshvara	Turuvekere	Tumkur	1260	Shiva
Yoga-Madhava	Settikere	Tumkur	1261	Vishnu
Chennakeshava	Turuvekere	Tumkur	1263	Vishnu
Lakshminarasimha	Vignasante	Tumkur	1286	Vishnu
Laskshmi Narasimha	Bhadravati	Shimoga	13th c.	Vishnu
Anantha Padmanabha	Budnur	Mandya	13th c.	Vishnu
Kashi Vishveshvara	Budnur	Mandya	13th c.	Shiva
Rameshvara	Ramanathapura	Hassan	13th c.	Shiva
