= Sacred Ensembles of the Hoysalas =

UNESCO World Heritage Site
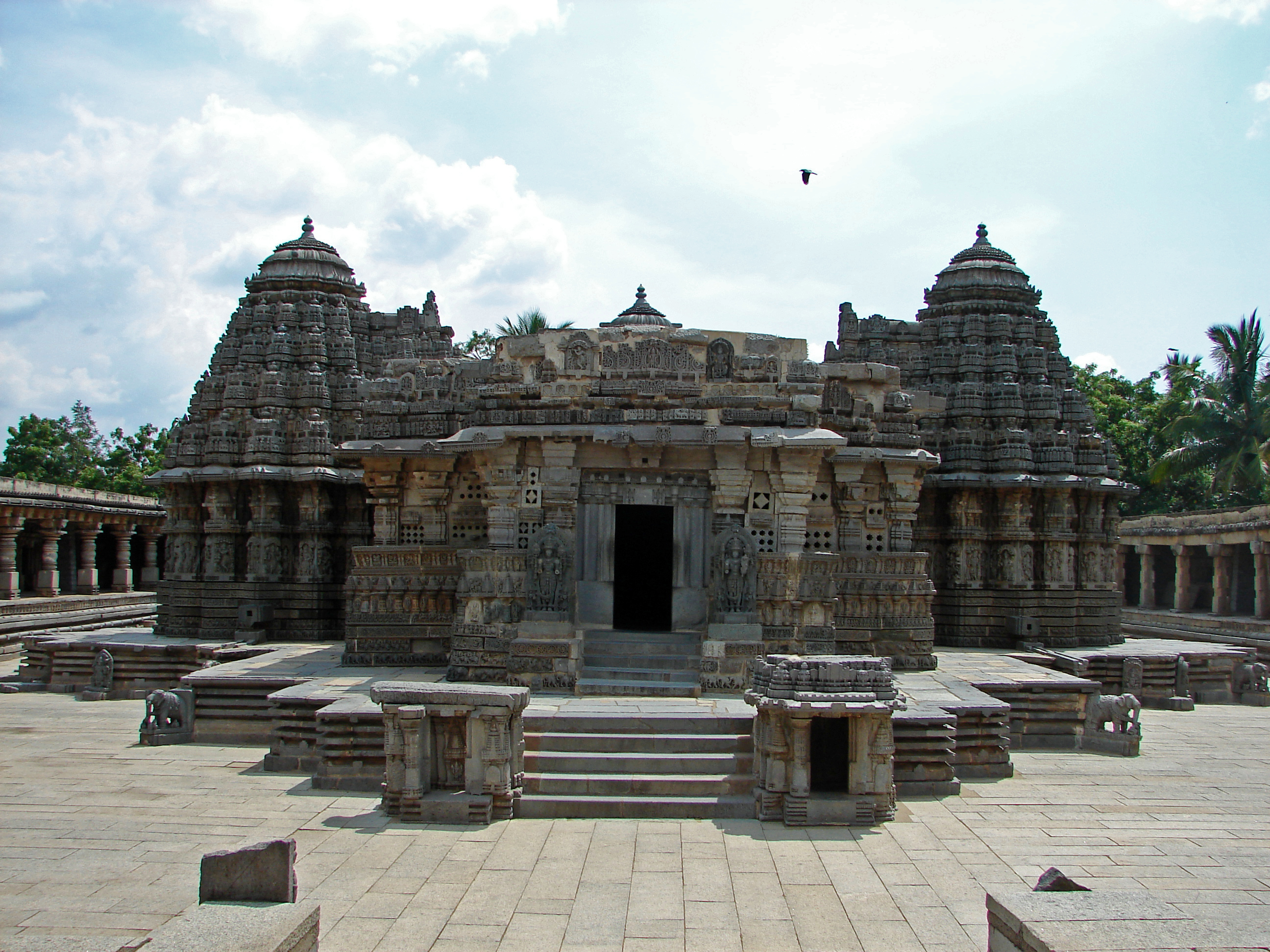

- Location within India Location within Karnataka
- Location: Karnataka, India
- Includes: Chennakeshava Temple, Belur; Hoysaleswara Temple, Halebidu; Keshav Temple, Somanathapura
- Criteria: Cultural: i, ii, iv
- Reference: 1670
- Inscription: 2023 (45th Session)

The Sacred Ensembles of the Hoysalas is a group of three Hoysala-style temples in South India recognized as a World Heritage Site. These temples at Somanathapura, Belur and Halebidu, were built between the 12th and 13th centuries under the Hoysala Empire. The three temples under the title of the Sacred Ensembles of the Hoysalas were inscribed on the UNESCO World Heritage List in 2023, for their outstanding architecture, hyper-realistic sculptures and stone carvings.

The architectural style of the three temples was developed by the early Hoysala rulers – who established their new kingdoms and regimes in South India – as a distinctive and innovative sacred architecture, which distinguishes the temples from contemporary kingdoms and dynasties. These temples are as follows:

- Chennakeshava Temple in Belur (built by King Vishnuvardhana).
- Hoysaleswara Temple in Halebidu (built by King Vishnuvardhana).
- Keshav Temple in Somanathapura (built by Somanatha under King Narasimha III).

== Location ==
Location of Sacred Ensembles of the Hoysalas.

The Sacred Ensembles of the Hoysalas is located in three places in two districts of Karnataka, there are two temples in Hassan district and one temple in Mysore district.

The Chennakeshava Temple is located in Belur, about 35 kilometers (22 mi) northwest of Hassan town, the headquarter of Hassan district. The temple is about 16 kilometers (9.9 mi) away from Halebidu Temple. The nearest airport to the temple is Bangalore Airport, from which it is a 220 km (137 mi) long drive of about 3.5 hours on National Highway 75 heading west. The Hoysaleswara Temple is located in Halebidu town in Hassan district of Karnataka state. It is about 30 km (19 ma) north-west of Hassan and about 16 km (9.9 ma) from Belur temple. The temple is reached by a 210 km (130 mi) long drive of about 4 hours on the National Highway 75 heading west from Bangalore Airport. The nearest city to both the temples of Hassan district is Hassan, which is connected to the major cities of Karnataka by railway network.

The Keshav Temple is located at Somnathpura, 38 kilometers (24 mi) east of Mysore city, the headquarters of Mysore district.

== History ==
The Hoysala dynasty ruled large parts of present-day Karnataka between the 11th and 14th centuries. By the end of the 12th century, they had expanded the agrarian economic system of their kingdom and had also begun to establish taxation, revenue and administrative systems, thus beginning the process of state formation. At the same time, the Hoysala kings made a concerted effort to establish a new and distinct identity for their kingdom through patronage of art, architecture and literature. As a result, a new form of temple architecture developed, combining superior carving and superior decoration with innovative temple planning. This architectural style synthesized and combined architectural features prevalent in different parts of the country with original elements in innovative ways.

One of the Hoysala kings was Vishnuvardhana, who came to power in 1110 AD. He commissioned the Chennakeshava Temple dedicated to Vishnu in 1117 AD, it considered the "five foundations" of his legacy. The main Chennakeshava Temple at Belur was completed in 1117 AD, although the complex continued to expand for over 100 years. Ketamalla, an employee of King Vishnuvardhana, built the Hoysaleswara Temple in 1150 AD. It also mentions that the king granted land for the construction, operation and maintenance of the Shiva temple in 1121 AD. It is the largest temple built by the Hoysala kings dedicated to the Hindu god Shiva. The Keshav Temple at Somanathapura was completed in 1258 AD by King Somnath. He also built a fort wall around the land, but these are now in ruins. The Hoysala kings employed many famous architects and craftsmen, who developed a new architectural tradition, which art historian Adam Hardy calls the Karnata Dravida tradition.

The temples became targets of plundered and destruction by the Delhi Sultanate army of Alauddin Khalji in the early 14th century and another Delhi Sultanate army of Sultan Muhammad bin Tughluq in 1326 AD.

According to a 15th-century inscription, the Keshav Temple was also badly damaged. It was repaired in the 16th century with financial support and grants from the emperors of the Vijayanagara Empire. Repairs are evidenced by the varying color and quality of stonework in the veranda and north tower and in parts of the platform of the main temple. The repaired temples was damaged in the 19th century, then rebuilt by the colonial-era Government of Mysore in the early 20th century.

== Temples ==
Temples, religious affiliations and consecration years
Sequence	Modern temple name	Religion	Deity	Completed by (CE)	Image
1	Chennakeshava Temple	Hinduism	Vishnu	1117	
2	Hoysaleswara Temple	Hinduism	Shiva	1160	
3	Keshava Temple	Hinduism	Vishnu	1258	

The Chennakeshava Temple is a 12th-century temple commissioned in 1117 CE by the Hoysala king Vishnuvardhana and his principal queen Shantala. Constructed from chloritic schist (soapstone), the temple is recognized for its Hoysala architectural style and features a complex stellate plan. The structure stands on an elevated, five-layered jagati (raised platform) designed to follow the star-shaped contour of the shrine, functioning as a pathway for pradakshina (circumambulation). The temple is notable for its stone relief work, including bracket figures known as madanikas, along with jalis (perforated stone screens) illustrating narrative scenes from Hindu scriptures. Its adhisthana (plinth) features continuous horizontal friezes depicting animals, human figures, and narrative panels based on the Ramayana and the Mahabharata. The temple is an active place of worship and is administered by the Department of Religious and Charitable Endowments of the Government of Karnataka.

The Hoysaleswara temple is a 12th-century Hindu temple dedicated to Shiva located in Halebidu, formerly known as Dorasamudra, the historical capital of the Hoysala Empire in Karnataka, India. Consecrated around 1121 CE during the reign of King Vishnuvardhana, it is the largest surviving example of Hoysala architecture. The temple's construction was commissioned by Ketamalla Dandanayaka, a prominent merchant and officer in the Hoysala court, and named after King Vishnuvardhana and his queen, Shantaladevi. The temple is a dvikuta (twin-shrine) plan built on a jagati that mirrors the star-shaped contour of the structure. It features two identical 16-pointed star-shaped garbhagrihas connected by a shared mandapa. The shrines house two Shivalingas, known as Hoysalesvara and Shantalesvara. The temple features adhistana (plinth), which consists eight horizontal frieze tiers carved with figures of elephants, lions, makaras, foliage, and scenes from Hindu epics such as the Ramayana, Mahabharata, and Bhagavata Purana.

The Keshava Temple is a 13th-century Vaishnava Hindu temple situated in Somanathapura, Karnataka, India. Consecrated in 1268 CE, the temple was established by Somanatha Dandanayaka, a high-ranking military commander under the Hoysala King Narasimha III. Architecturally, the complex is designed as a trikuta (triple-celled) structure dedicated to three iconographic forms of Vishnu—Keshava, Janardhana, and Venugopala—with each sanctum constructed on a 16-pointed star-shaped (stellate) floor plan. The central structure is enclosed by a walled compound (prakara) featuring a perimeter gallery of 56 small shrines. Managed by the Archaeological Survey of India (ASI) as a protected monument of national importance, the temple is preserved as a heritage site and no longer functions as an active place of worship.

== UNESCO World Heritage Designation ==
The property was placed on UNESCO's tentative list in April 2014, and the Government of India submitted its official nomination dossier in 2022, prepared by the Indian National Trust for Art and Cultural Heritage (INTACH) Bengaluru Chapter alongside the Archaeological Survey of India (ASI) and the Department of Archaeology, Museums and Heritage (DAMH) of Karnataka. The ensembles were inscribed under Cultural Criterion (i) for their artistic and architectural design, characterized by intricate chloritic schist (soapstone) carvings, high-relief figures, and narrative friezes depicting Hindu epics and theological themes. Many of the sculptures feature carved artists' signatures, documenting individual sculptors. The property also fulfills Cultural Criterion (ii), reflecting an architectural synthesis that incorporates elements from northern Nagara, southern Dravida, central Bhumija, and western Chalukyan styles, combined with features such as stellate (star-shaped) floor plans and multi-tiered plinths (adhisthana).

== Conservation ==
Conservation of the Sacred Ensembles of the Hoysalas began in the early 20th century under the Mysore princely state, which issued official protection orders for the Belur and Halebidu temples by 1924. Pre-independence work focused on structural stabilization, including the removal of later additions such as the Naganayakana mandapa at Belur in 1935, and the installation of masonry buttresses to mitigate lateral thrust on the outer sanctum walls at Halebidu and Somanathapura.

Following Indian independence, management of the sites transferred to the central government. The three temple complexes were designated monuments of national importance under the Archaeological Survey of India (ASI) in 1951. Structural interventions by the ASI have included roof waterproofing using traditional lime mortar, reinforcement of cracked or dislodged beams using concealed stainless steel T-section girders and reconstruction of collapsed sections of the prakara (enclosure) walls. To mitigate weathering on external facades, the ASI periodically applies chemical treatments using dilute organic acids to remove moss, lichen, soot, and historic lime wash layers. The chlorotic schist surfaces are subsequently treated with protective coatings of microcrystalline wax or acrylic resin.

Between 2011 and 2012, a restoration project was completed at Somanathapura, where the leaning cloistered mandapas and outer prakara wall were dismantled and reconstructed according to their original layout.

While the Chennakesava Temple at Belur continues to function as an active place of worship under the Karnataka State Department of Religious and Charitable Endowments (Muzrai Department), the Hoysaleswara and Keshava temples are maintained by the ASI as protected non-living monuments.
