= Mallikarjuna Temple =

Mallikarjuna Temple may refer to:

- Mallikarjuna Temple, Basaralu
- Mallikarjuna Temple, Goa
- Mallikarjuna Temple, Hirenallur
- Mallikarjuna Temple, Inavolu
- Mallikarjuna Temple, Kuruvatti
- Mallikarjuna Temple, Srisailam
