= Sun Temple, Sesai =

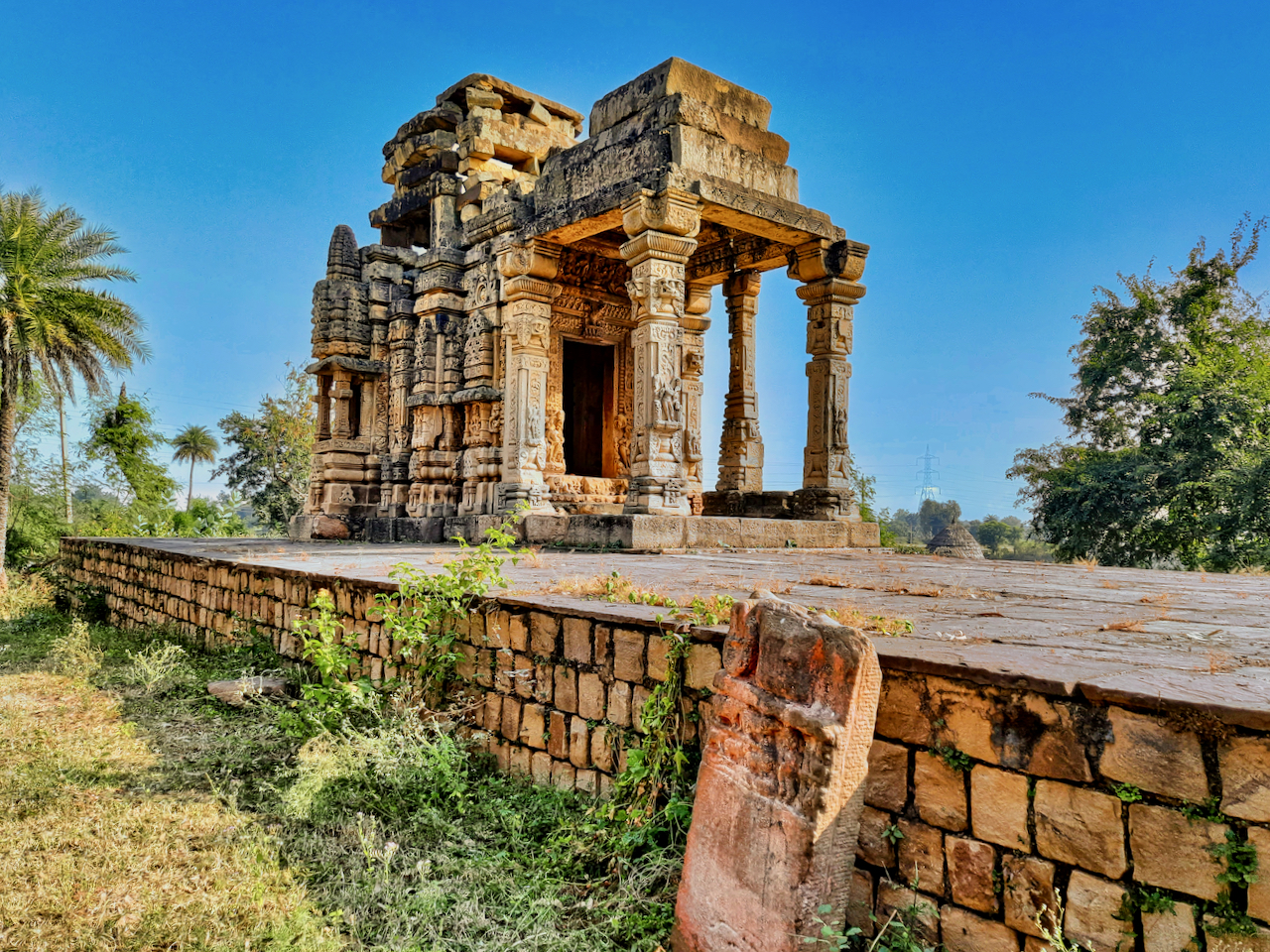

Religion
- Affiliation: Hinduism
- Deity: Surya

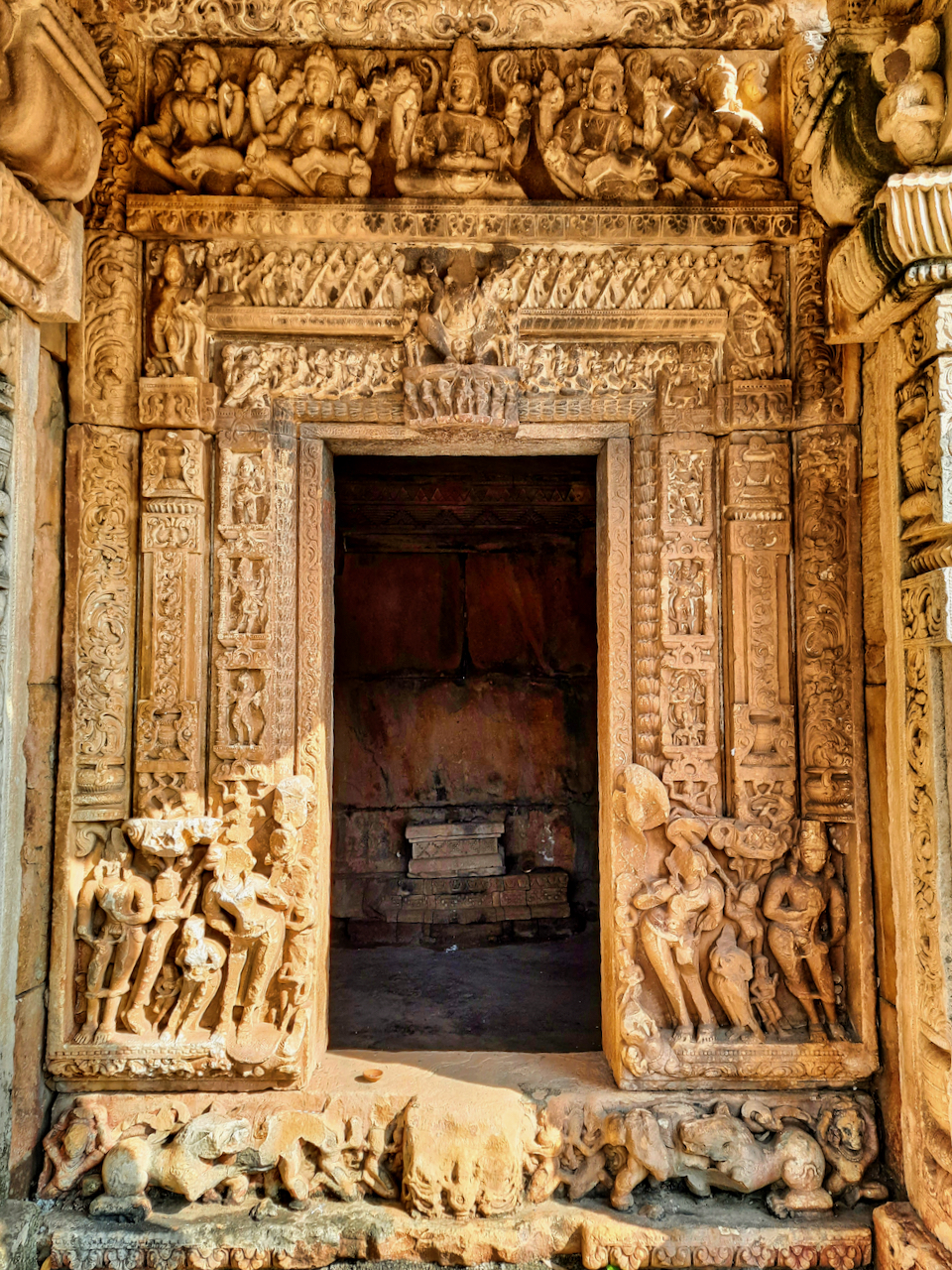
Entrance

Sun Temple, Sesai or Surya Temple, Sesai is a temple located in Sesai, in the Indian state of Madhya Pradesh. It is dedicated to the worship of Surya, the solar deity in Hinduism.

== Description ==
The temple is west-facing, and is situated atop a jagati.
