= Chennakeshava Temple, Aralaguppe =

Chennakeshava Temple
- Hindu temple
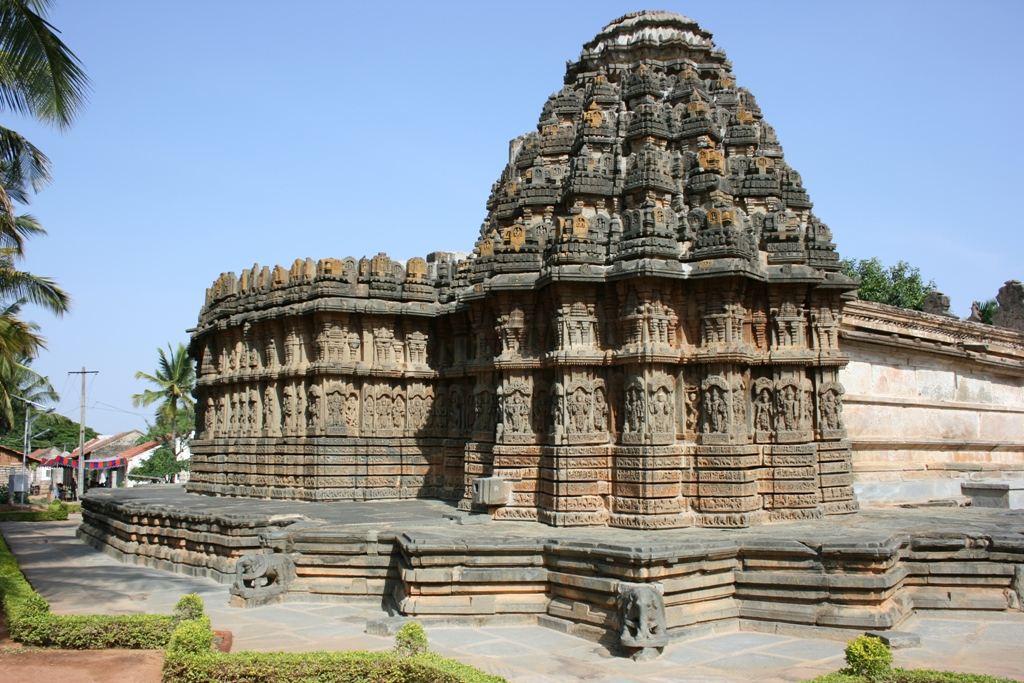
- Chennakeshava temple (1250 A.D.) at Aralaguppe
- Interactive map of Chennakeshava Temple
- Coordinates: 13.2522°N 76.6155°E
- Country: India
- State: Karnataka
- District: Tumkur District

Languages
  - Official: Kannada
- Time zone: UTC+5:30 (IST)

The Chennakeshava temple, dedicated to the Hindu god Vishnu, is located in Aralaguppe, a small town in Karnataka state, India. Aralaguppe is located 60 km from the city of Hassan. The temple was built around 1250 during the rule of the Hoysala Empire King Vira Someshwara. The temple is a protected monument under the Karnataka state division of the Archaeological Survey of India.

== Temple plan ==
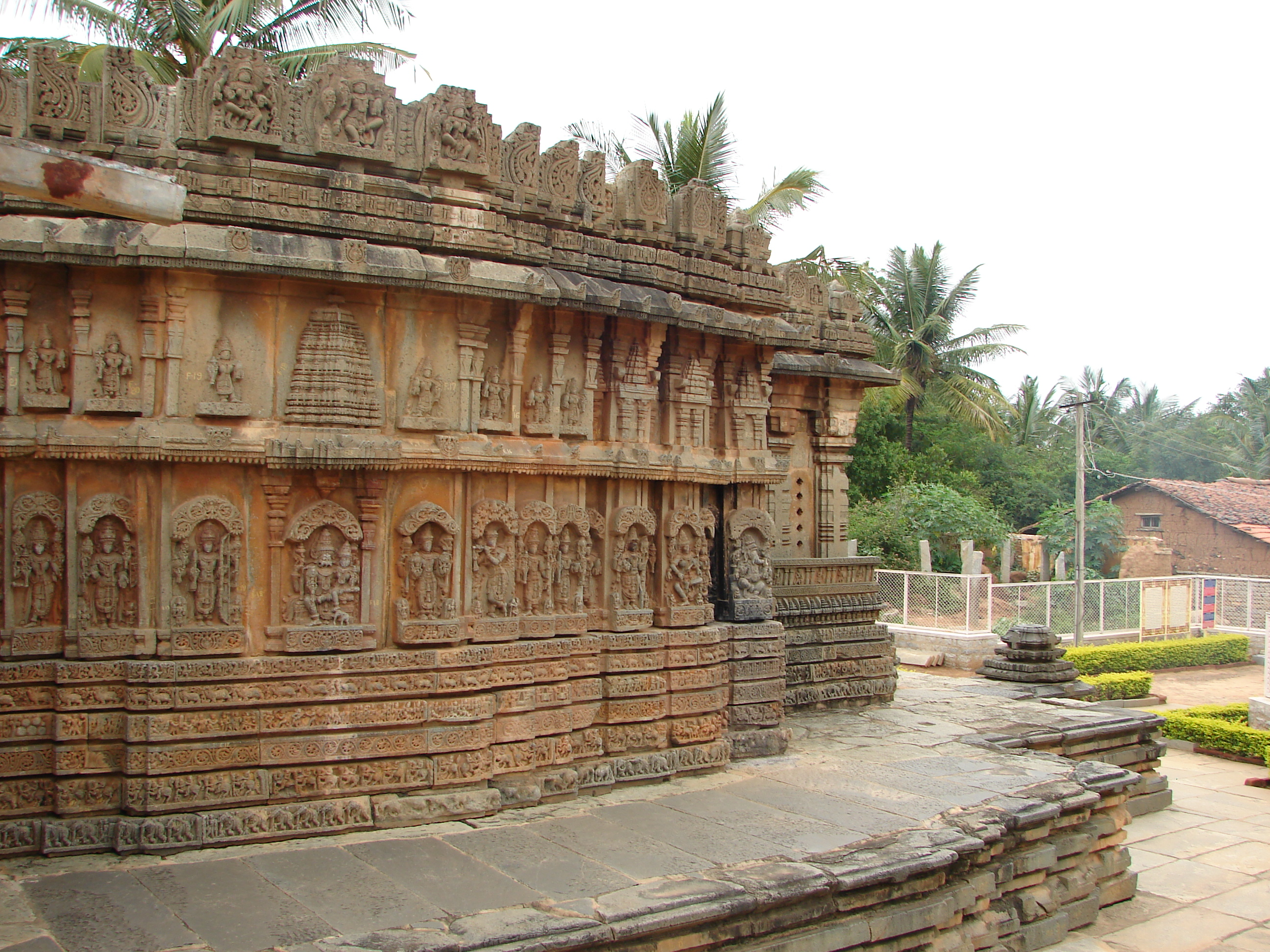
Chennakeshava temple at Aralaguppe, mantapa outer wall molding frieze and panel relief between and below eves

Though the temple is simple and elegant, it is a highly articulate example of Hoysala architecture. Architecturally, the plan is 16-star pointed (stellate) with a well design shikhara (tower) over the vimana (shrine). The kalasa on top (a decorative water-pot at the top of the tower) is missing though. The tower starts with a topping roof which is also 16-star pointed and is followed by four tiers of square roofs, some of which still have their decorative kalasa.

This is a ekakuta plan (single shrine with a tower) with the temple raised on a platform called jagati. The decorative plan of the walls of the shrine and the mantapa (hall) is of the "new kind", a plan in which the temple has two eaves. The first heavy eave runs below the superstructure and all around the temple with a projection of about half a meter. The second eave runs around the temple about a meter below the first. In between the two eaves are the well chiseled miniature decorative towers (aedicula) on pilasters. Below the second eaves are the wall panel of images of Hindu deities and their attendants in relief. Below this, at the base, are the six equal-width rectangular moldings (frieze). Starting from the top, the friezes depict hansa (birds) in the first frieze, makara (aquatic monsters) in the second, epics and other stories in the third (which in this case is from the Hindu epic Ramayana and stories of Krishna), leafy scrolls in the fourth, horses in the fifth and elephants at the bottom. The cella (sanctum) contains an image of Keshava (a version of the Hindu god Krishna) raised on a large pedestal.

== Gallery ==
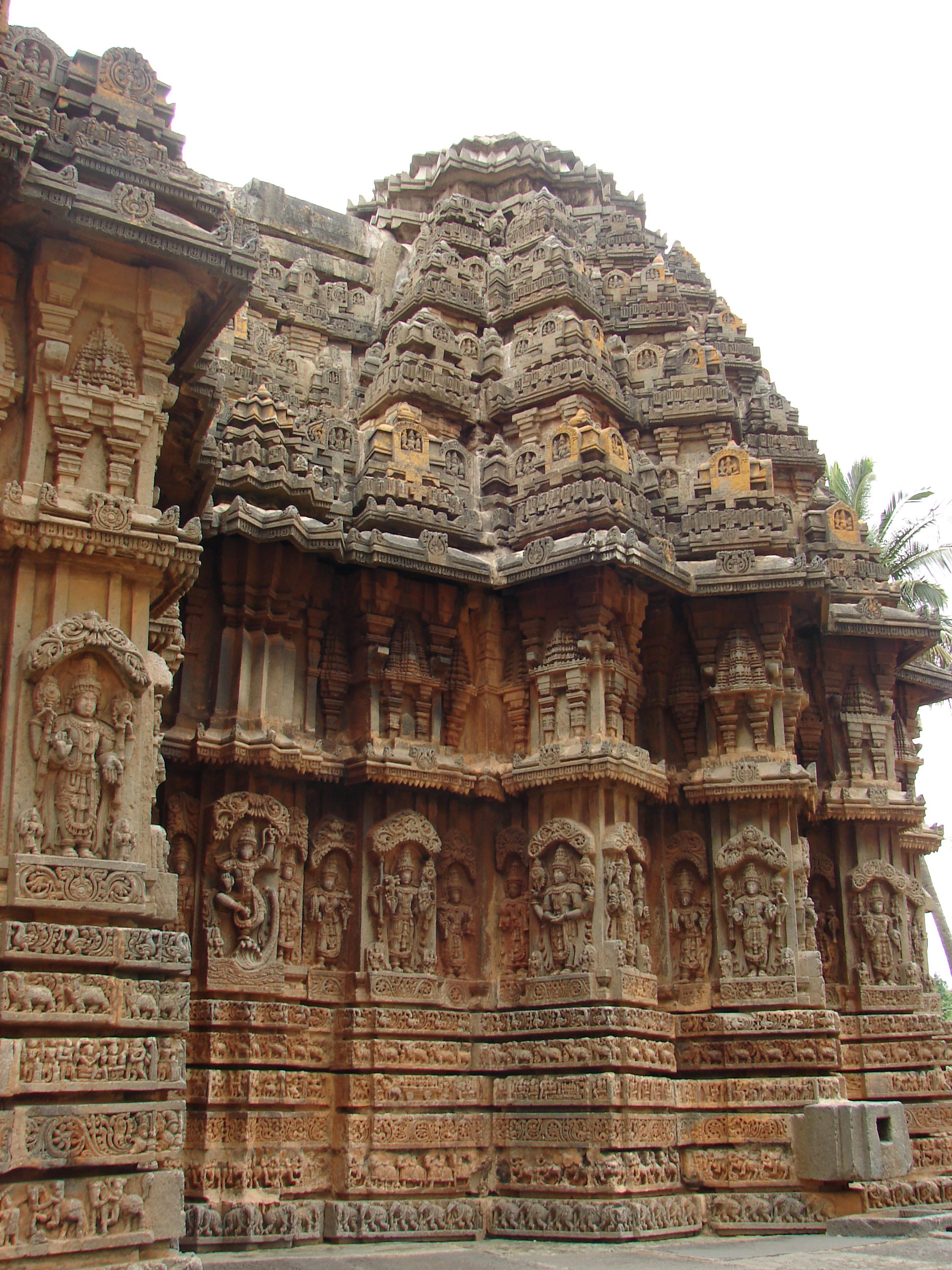
Star pointed shrine architecture, Chennakeshava temple at Aralaguppe

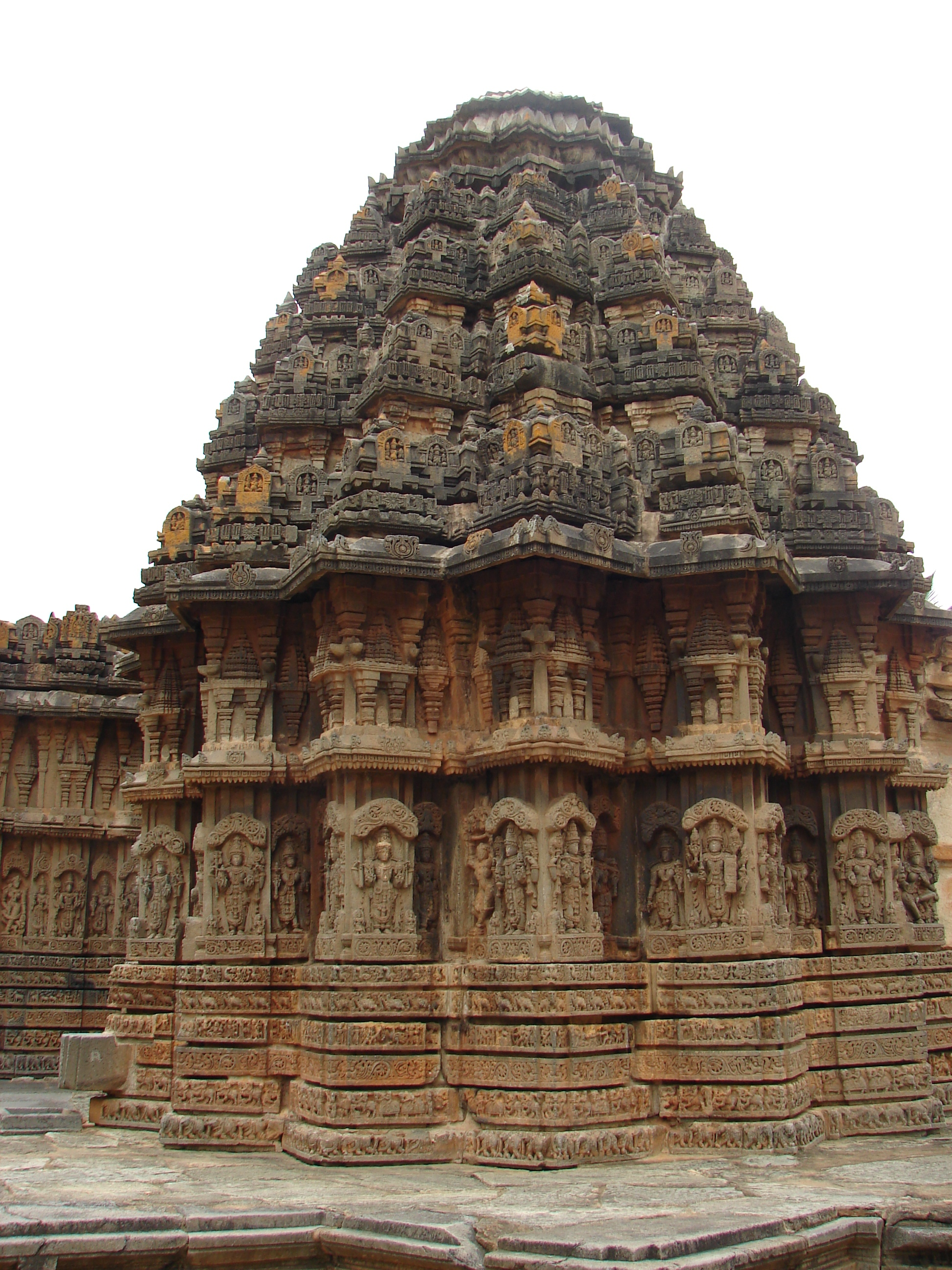
Star pointed shrine from another angle, Chennakeshava temple at Aralaguppe

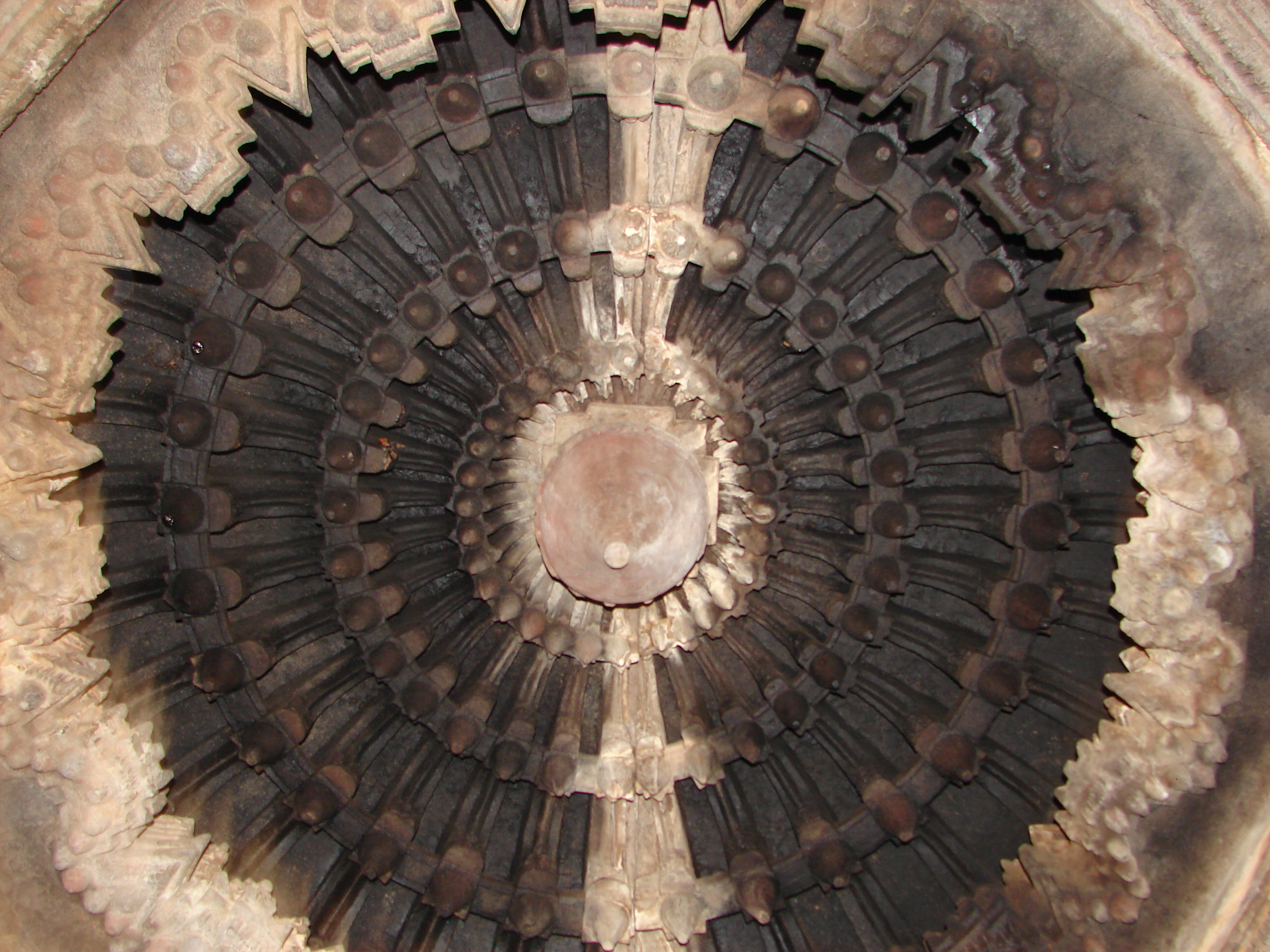
Ornate domical bay ceiling in Chennakeshava temple at Aralaguppe

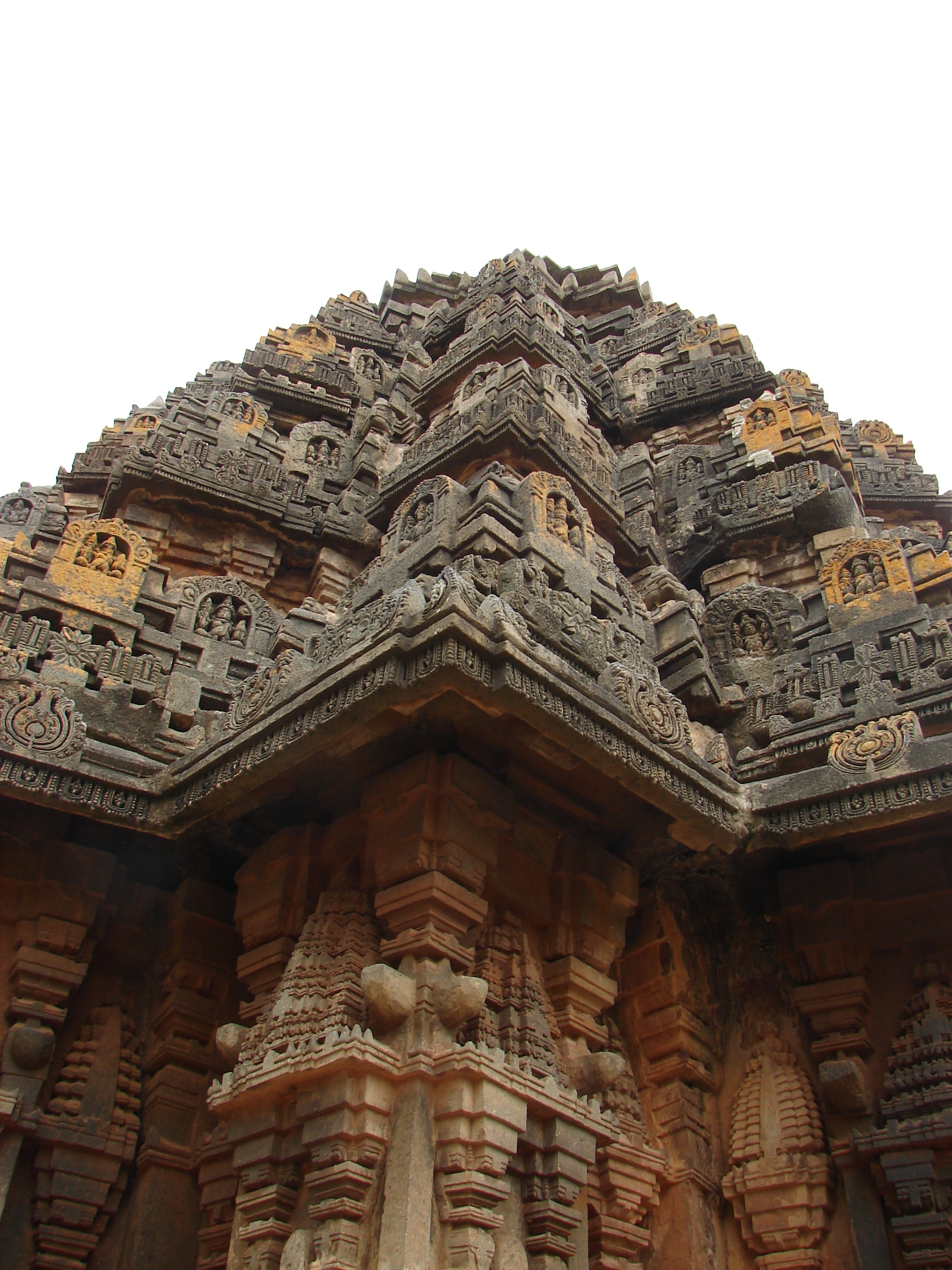
Close up of star pointed (stellate) vimana in Chennakeshava temple at Aralaguppe
