= Aane Kannambadi =

Village in Karnataka, India

Coordinates: 12.6404°N 76.2998°E

Aane Kannambadi is a village in Hassan, Karnataka. It is located on the Hassan – Mysore state highway and is about 25 km from Holenarasipura.

== Narayanaswamy Temple ==
Narayanaswamy temple in Aane Kannambadi is one Lesser known temples of the Hoysala Empire, was built in 12th century.

The temple has mainly three idols – Keshava (Narayanaswamy), Lakshminarasimha and Gopalakrishna. There are also Ganapathi and Mahishasura Mardini (Chamundeshwari) idols on the outer circles of the temple.

One inscription that belongs to 1244 A.D., informs us that the Aane Kannambaadi was converted as an 'Agrahara' and was donated at the time. And the temple is also known to have had served as a home for elephants back in the early 12th century.
