= Yoga Madhava Temple, Settikere =

Yoga Madhavaraya Temple
- Hindu temple
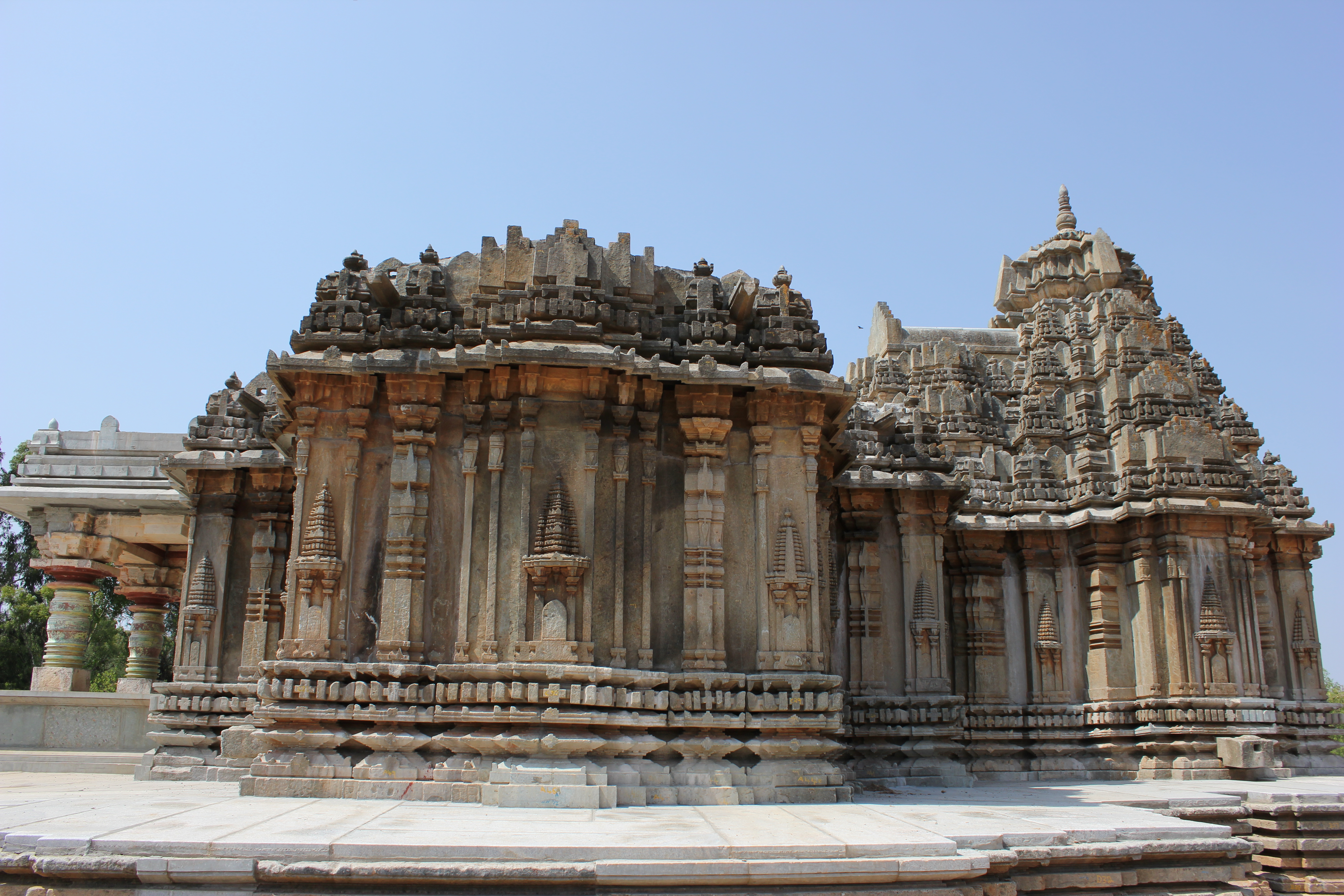
- Yoga Madhava temple (1261 A.D) in Tumkur district
- Interactive map of Yoga Madhavaraya Temple
- Coordinates: 13°22′52″N 76°33′32″E
- Country: India
- State: Karnataka
- District: Tumkur District

Languages
  - Official: Kannada
- Time zone: UTC+5:30 (IST)

The Yoga Madhava temple, dedicated to the Hindu god Vishnu is located in Shettikere, in the Tumkur district of Karnataka state, India.

== Temple plan ==
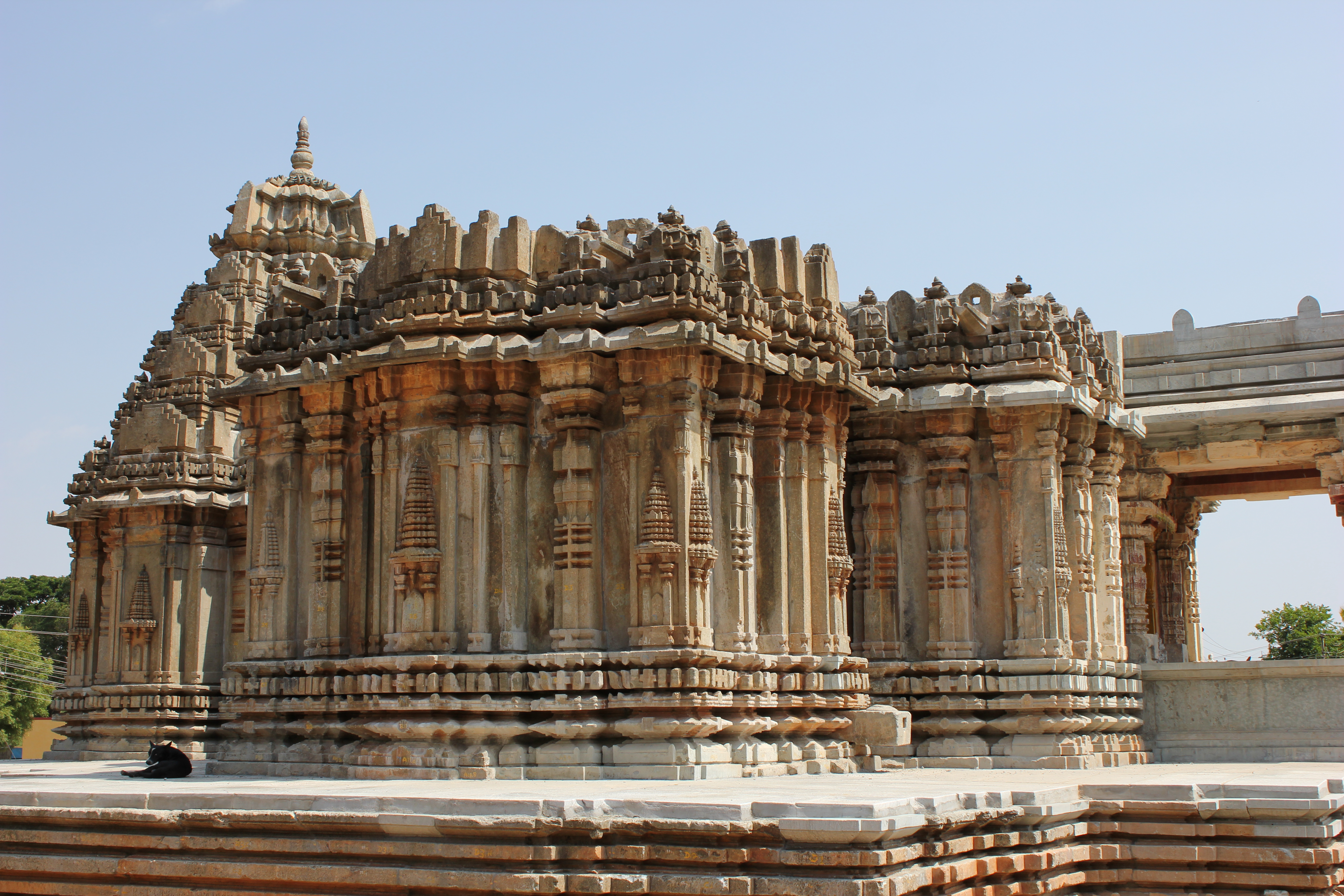
Profile of Yoga Madhava temple at Settikere

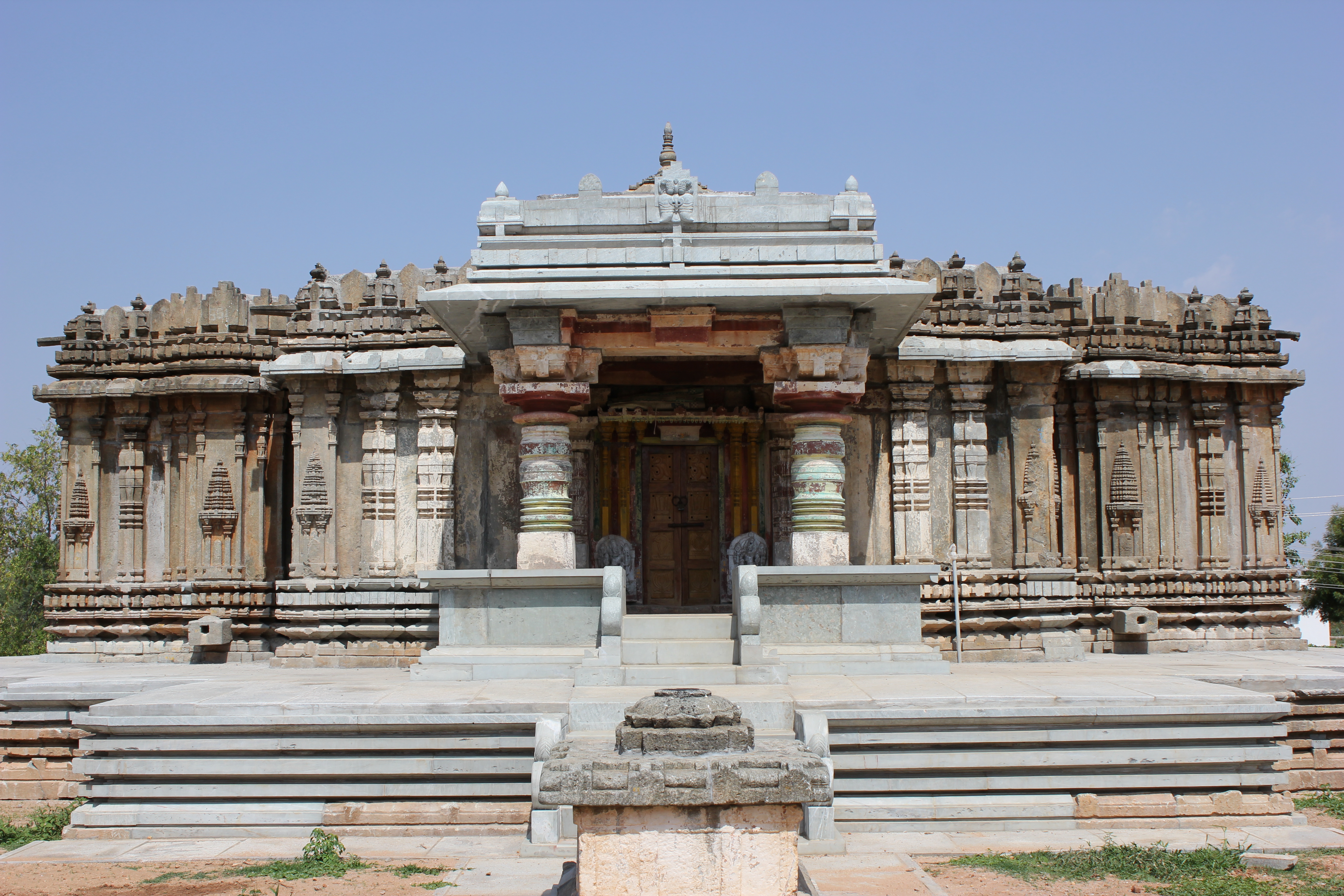
Front entrance to Yoga Madhava temple at Settikere

According to the art historian Adam Hardy, the temple which was built in 1261 A.D. by an officer of the Hoysala empire (ruled by King Narasimha III) is a three vimana (shrine) plan with the central shrine being semi-stellate (star shaped). The other two shrines on each side of the closed mantapa (hall) are semi-vimanas because they exhibit no tower. The building material is Soap stone.

The temple has all the standard features of the Hoysala architectural idiom:an open entrance mantapa (mukhamantapa or porch) followed by a closed mantapa with no windows, sukhanasi (vestibule) and a garbhagriha ("sanctum"). The temple gets an elevated look due to the jagati it stands on (a platform that is about a meter high). According to art historian Gerard Foekema, being a triple vimana construction it qualifies as a trikuta plan although only the central vimana usually has a tower (called shikhara) over it.

The entrance to the temple is through an open pillared porch (mukhamantapa) followed by a closed mantapa (or navaranga). According to Hardy, the eastern side of the temple shows some later additions. The porch consists of an awning supported by lathe turned half pillars and parapets on either side. The closed hall which has no windows connects to the sanctum via a vestibule (called sukhanasi). The vestibule also as a tower (also called sukhanasi) which looks like a low protrusion of the main tower over the shrine. The inner walls of the shrine are square and plain where as the outer walls are semi-stellate (semi-star shaped) with numerous recesses and projections that are used for decorative relief consisting of Aedicula and pilasters. The outer wall of the vestibule is also decorative but is inconspicuous because it appears like a short continuation of the shrine outer wall. The ceiling of the closed hall is supported by four lathe turned pillars which divide the ceiling into nine decorated bays. According to art historian Percy Brown the lathe turned pillars with four brackets above are a characteristic style of the Kalyani Chalukya-Hoysala architecture.

At the top of the shrine tower is the kalasha, a decorative water-pot like structure that is placed over a large dome (the "helmet") which is the largest piece of sculpture in the temple measuring about 2m x 2m. The design of the tower, according to Brown, is a speciality in Hoysala art. According to him, the stellate form of the base of the shrine with its "projections and recesses" is carried through the tower giving it a "fluted effect". The tower is divided into tiers with each tier diminishing in height and culminating in an umbrella like structure.
