= Mallikarjuna Temple, Inavolu =

Hindu temple in Telangana, India

Coordinates: 17°51′59″N 79°32′44″E

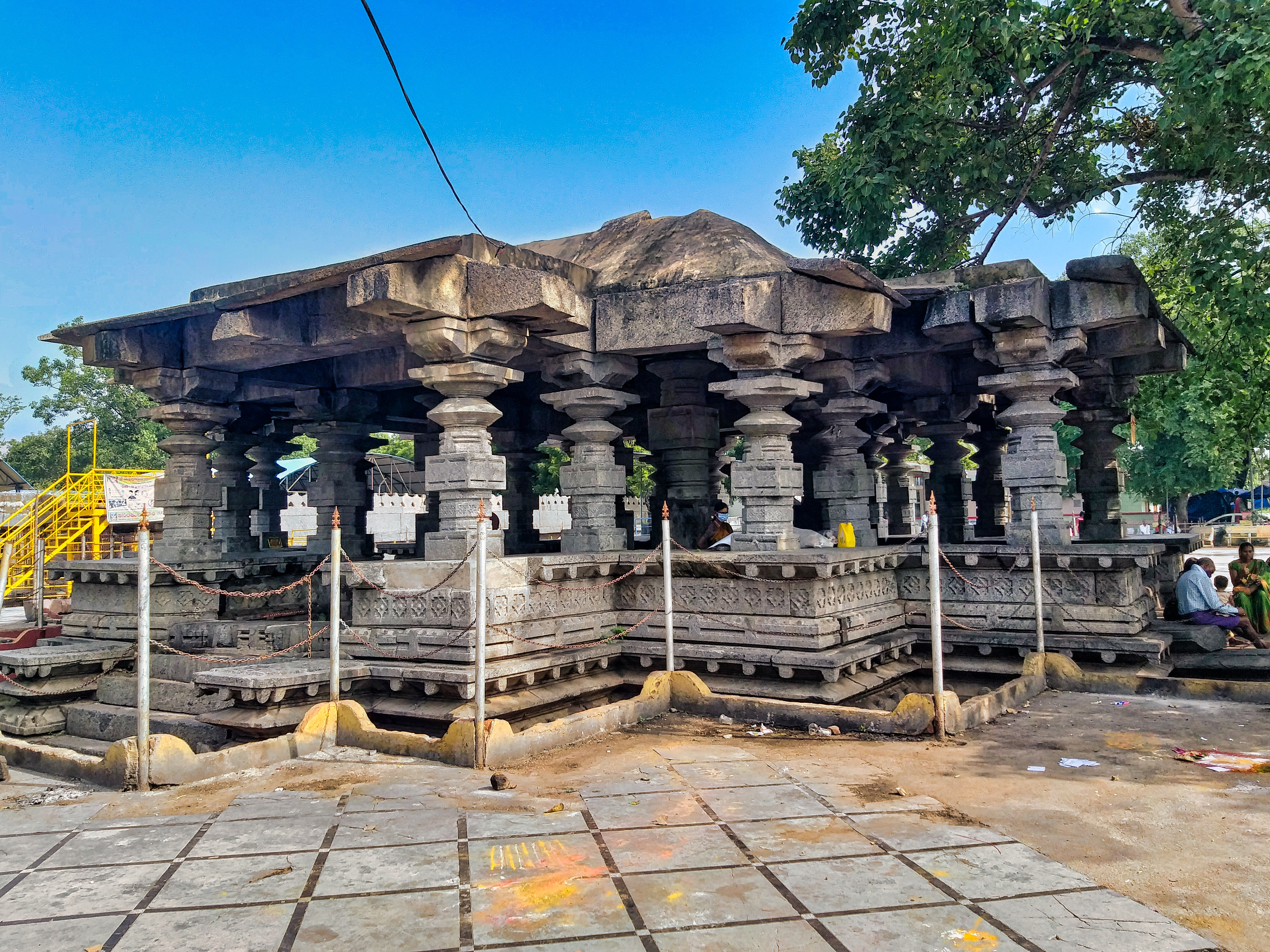

Religion
- Affiliation: Hinduism
- Deity: Mallanna (Shiva)
- Festival: Inavolu Jatara

Location
- Location: Inavolu, Telangana, India

Architecture
- Style: Kakatiya

Mallikarjuna temple, Inavolu is a temple in located in Inavolu in Warangal district in the Indian state of Telangana.

== History ==
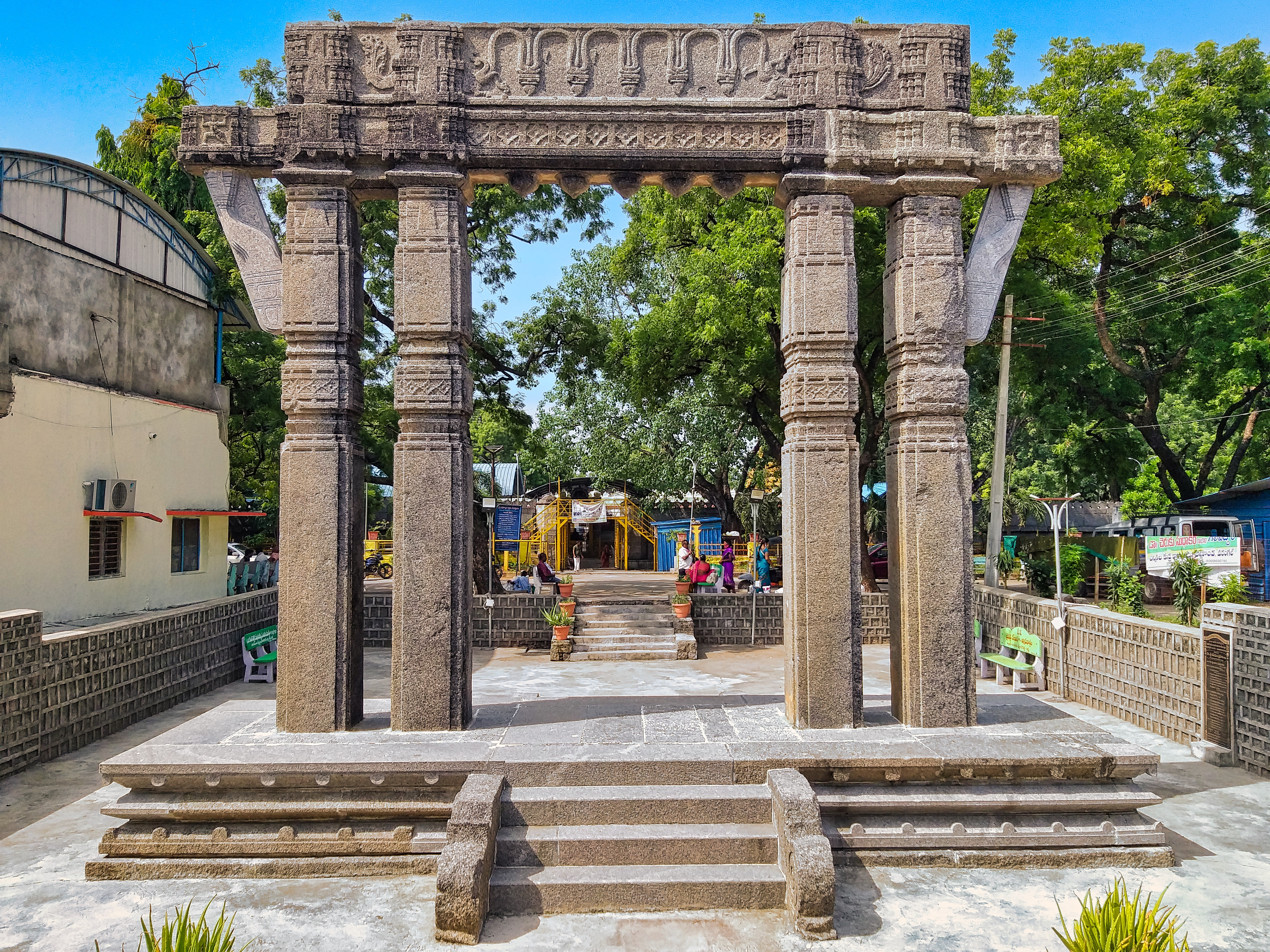
One of the toranas surrounding the temple.

The temple was built by the Kakatiya dynasty.

== Architecture ==
There is a 24-pillared mandapa in front of the temple. The temple is surrounded by toranas on the north, south, and east.

== Location ==
The temple is located in Inavolu, a village in the Hanamkonda district of Telangana. Inavolu is about 17 kilometres away from Warangal.
