= Mahalingeshvara Temple, Santebachalli =

Mahalingeshvara Temple
- Hindu temple
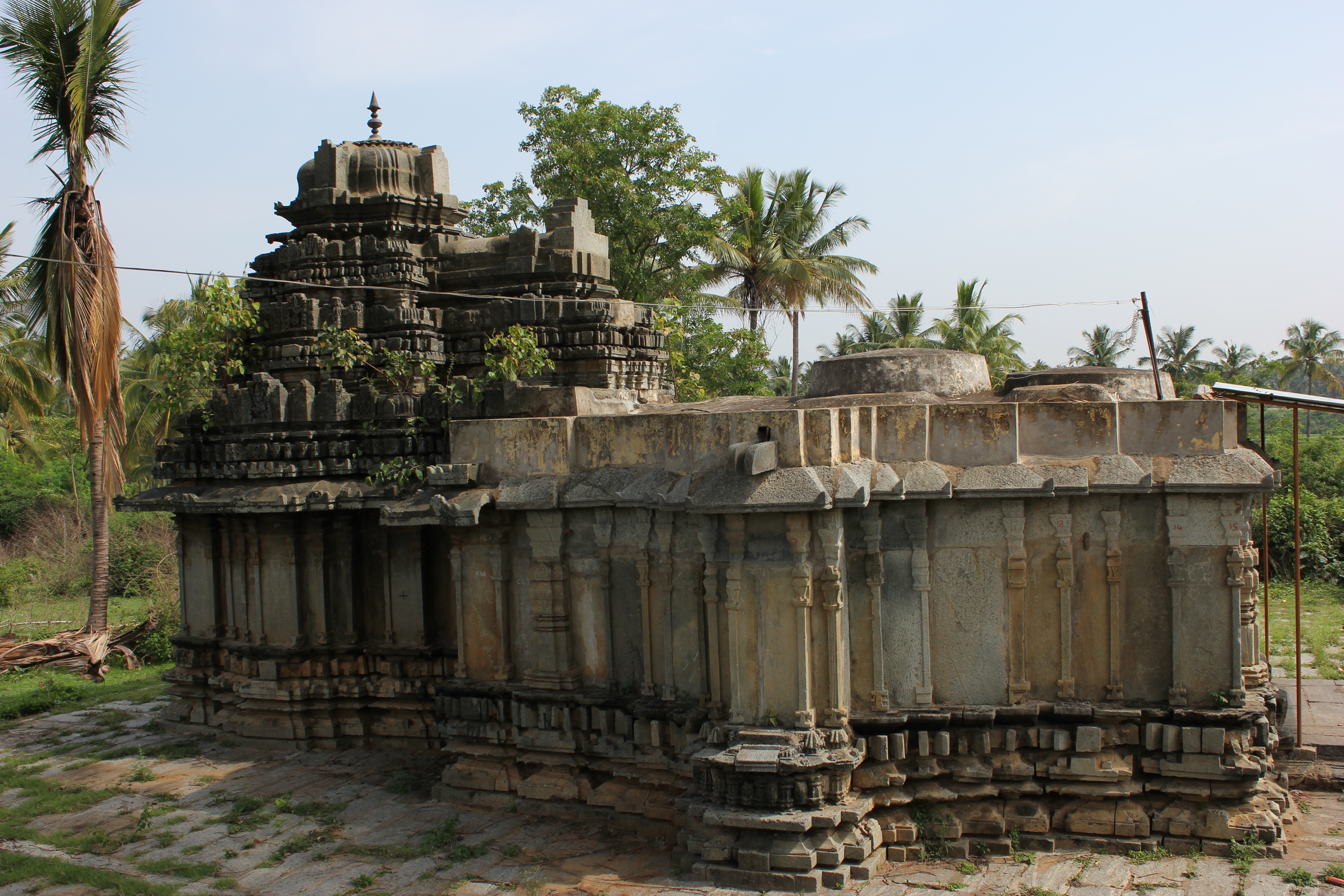
- Mahalingeshvara temple (12th century) Mandya district
- Country: India
- State: Karnataka
- District: Mandya District

Languages
  - Official: Kannada
- Time zone: UTC+5:30 (IST)

The Mahalingeshvara Temple at Sante Bachalli village (also spelt "Mahalingesvara"), is a 12th-century Hoysala era construction in the Mandya district of Karnataka state, India. According to noted art historian Adam Hardy, the temple architecture comprises a single vimana (etakuta, one shrine with a superstructure) with closed mantapa ("hall") and the building material is Soap stone. The monument is protected by the Karnataka state division of Archaeological Survey of India.

== Gallery ==
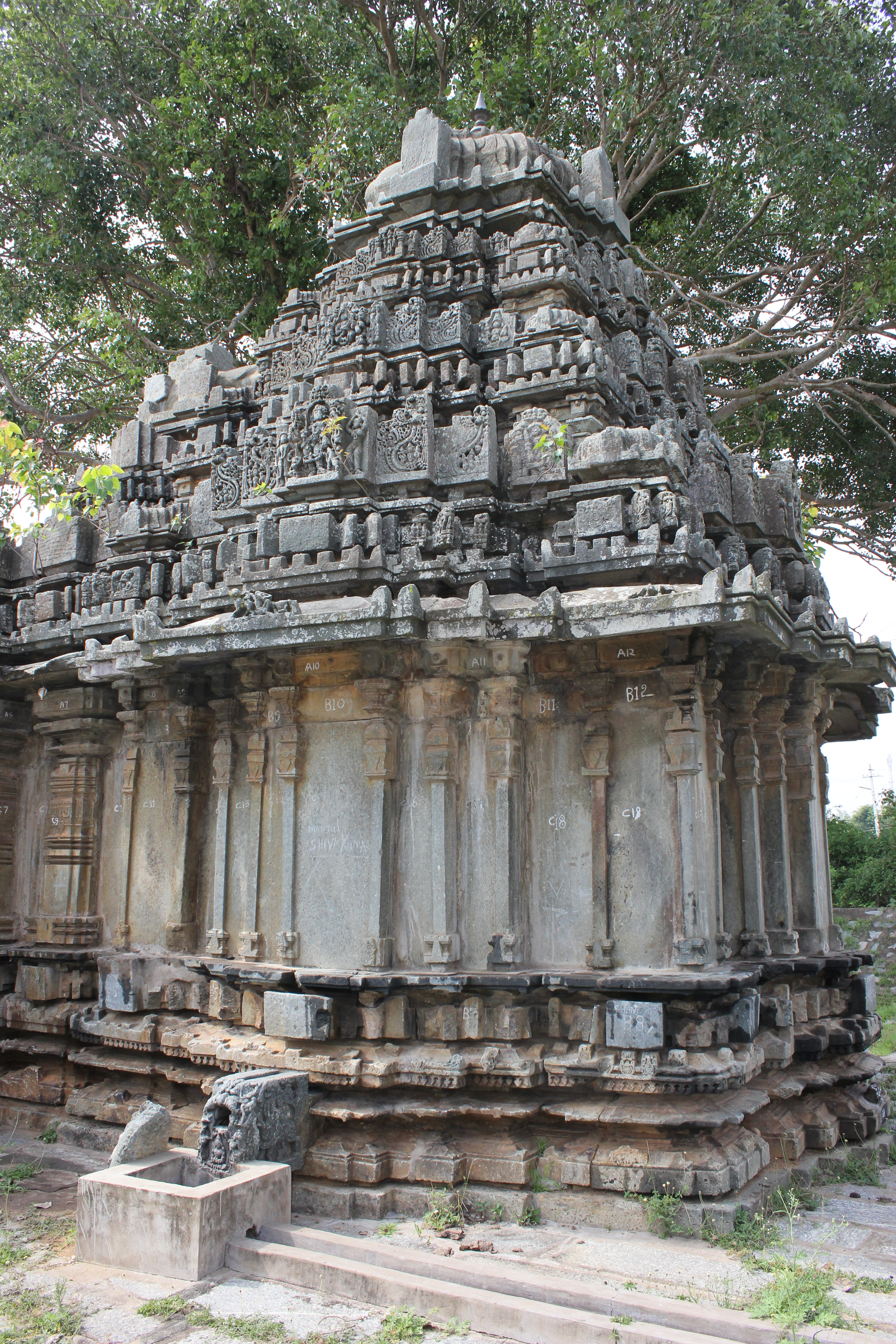
Shrine and tower over it in Mahalingeshvara temple at Sante Bachalli

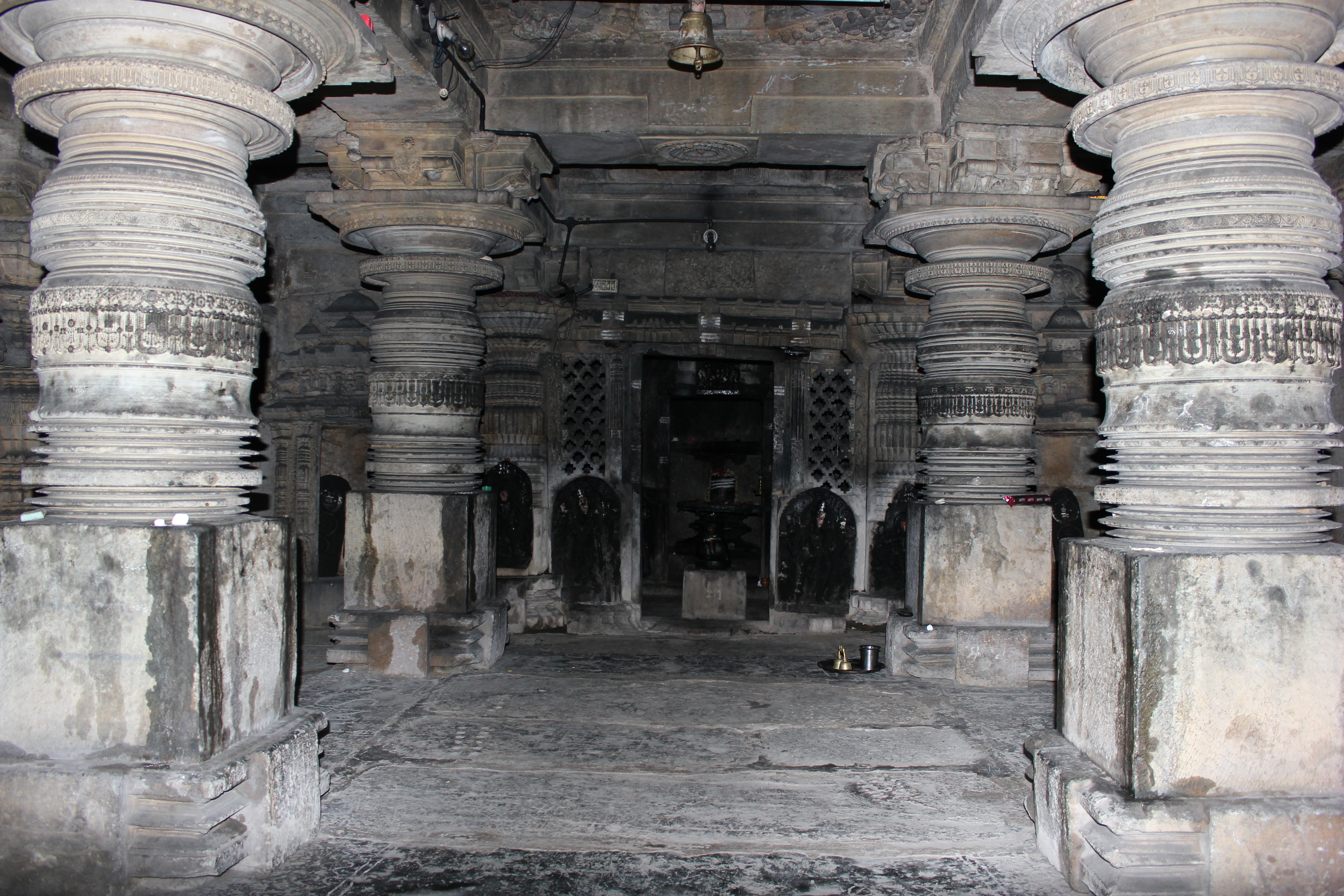
Mantapa leading to sanctum in Mahalingeshvara temple at Sante Bachalli
