= Yoga Narasimha Temple, Baggavalli =

Yoga Narasimha Temple
- Hindu temple
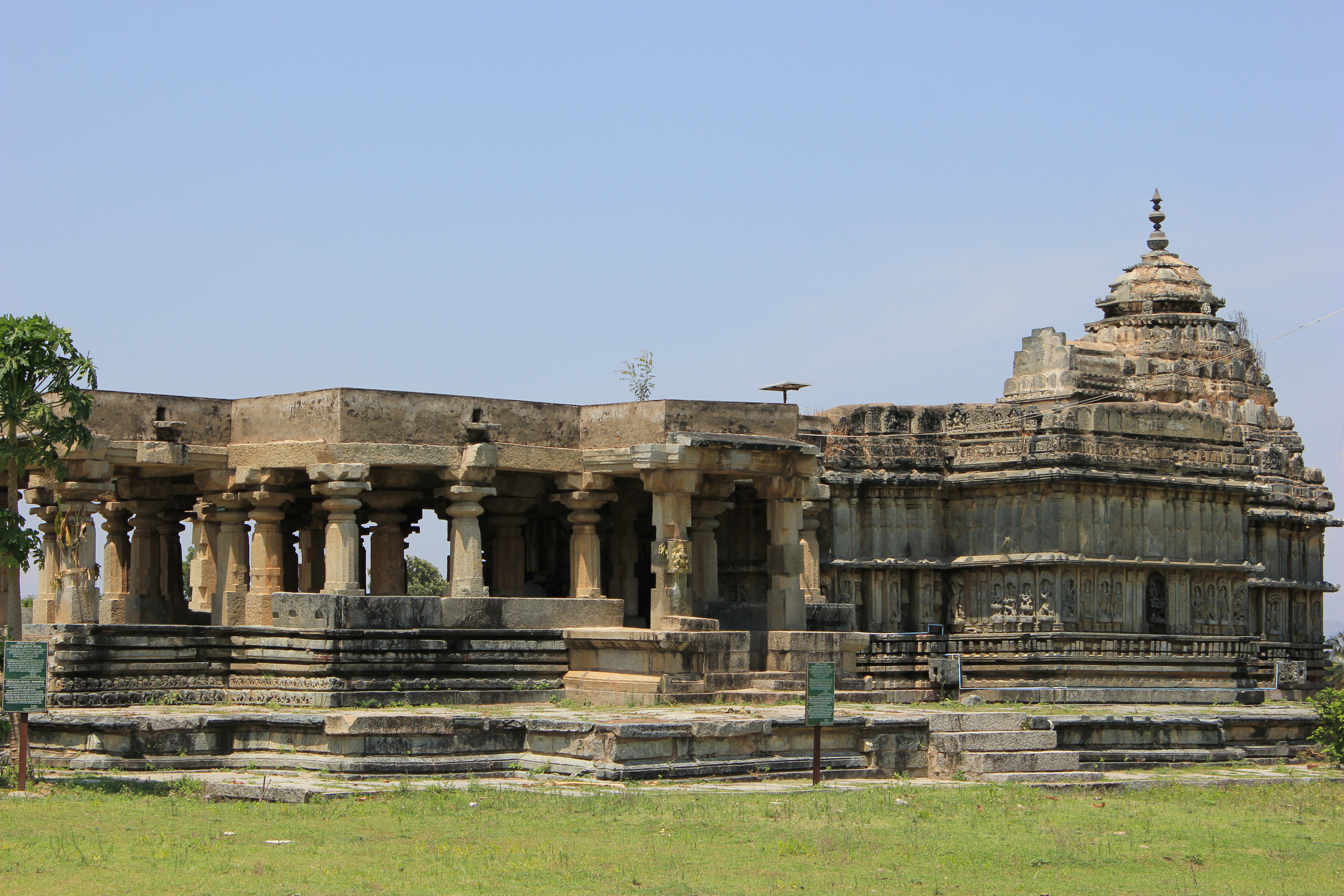
- Yoga Narasimha temple (12th-13th century) Chikkamagaluru district
- Country: India
- State: Karnataka
- District: Chikkamagaluru District

Languages
  - Official: Kannada
- Time zone: UTC+5:30 (IST)

The Yoga Narasimha Temple at Baggavalli, a Hoysala era construction was built in the early 13th century. Baggavalli is a village in Tarikere Taluq in the Chikkamagaluru district of Karnataka state, India. The monument is protected by the Karnataka state division of Archaeological Survey of India.

== Gallery ==
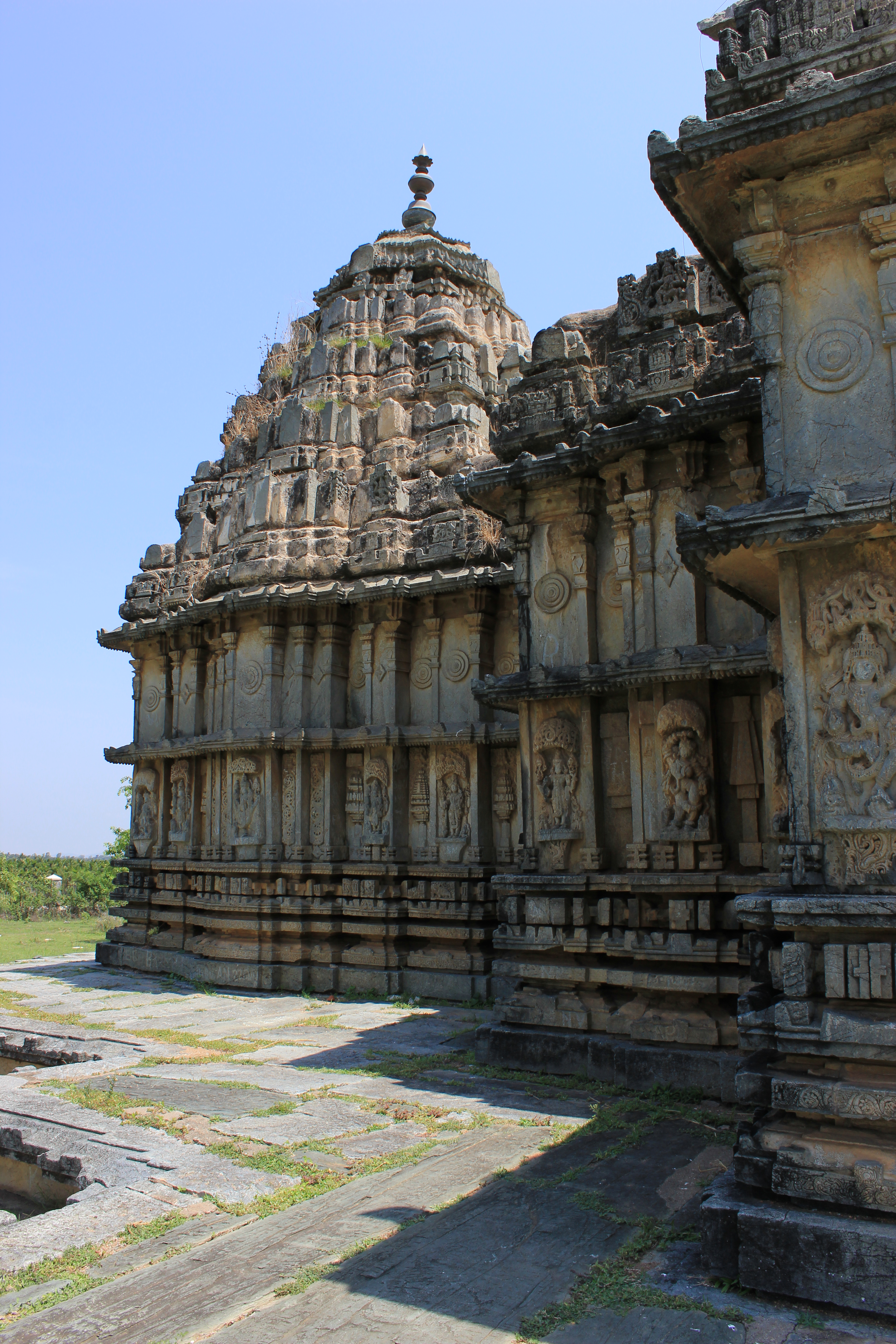
Profile of Yoga Narasimha temple at Baggavalli

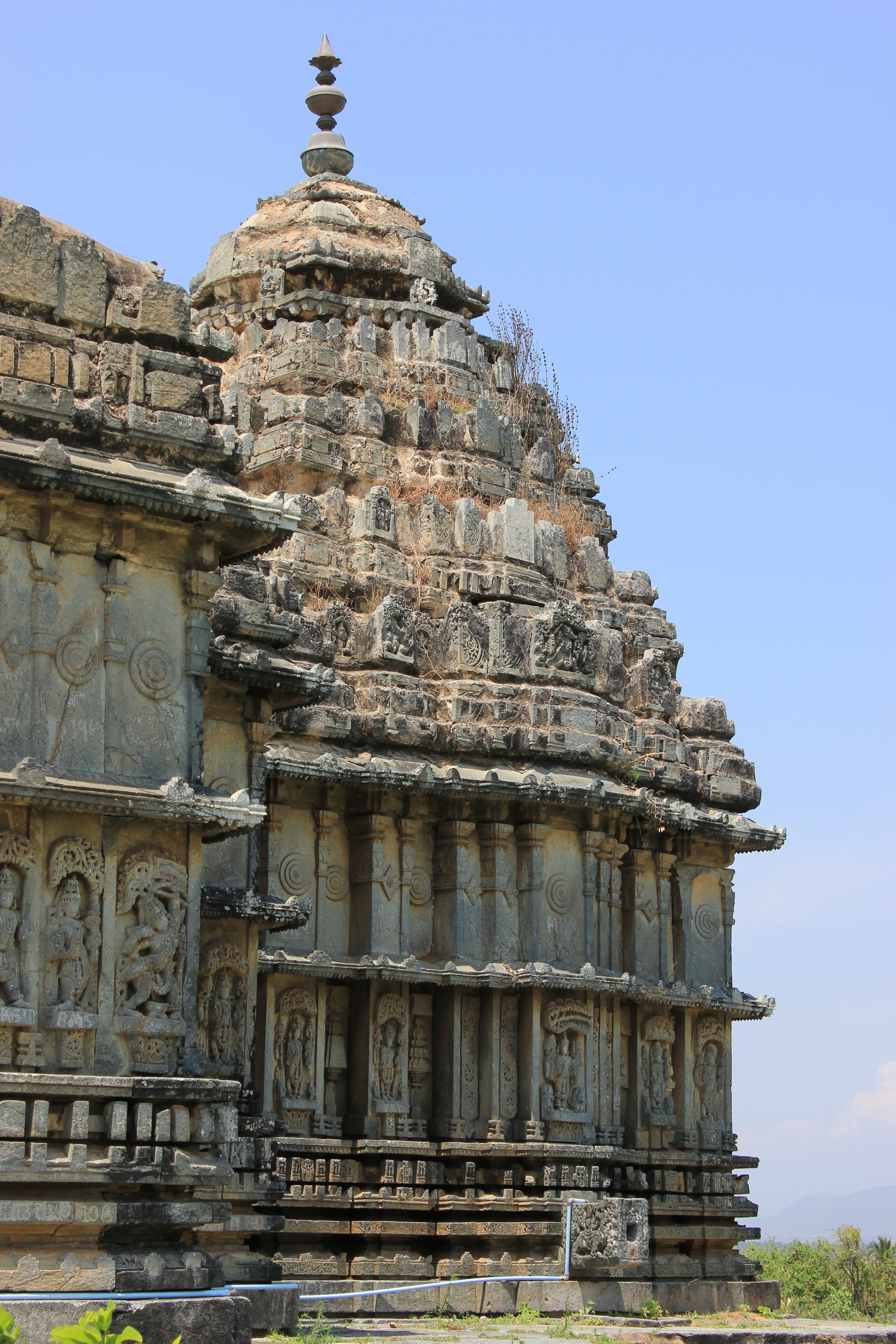
Profile of Yoga Narasimha temple at Baggavalli
