= Adagur =

- village
- Location in Karnataka, India Adagur (India)
- Coordinates: 12.871229°N 76.392129°E
- Country: India
- State: Karnataka
- District: Hassan
- Talukas: Channarayapatna

Government
  - Body: Village Panchayat

Languages
  - Official: Kannada
- Time zone: UTC+5:30 (IST)
- Nearest city: Hassan, India
- Civic agency: Village Panchayat

Adagur is a village in the southern state of Karnataka, India. It is located in the south side of Channarayapatna taluk of Hassan district in Karnataka.

== See also ==
- Hassan
- Districts of Karnataka
