= Economy of the Hoysala Kingdom =

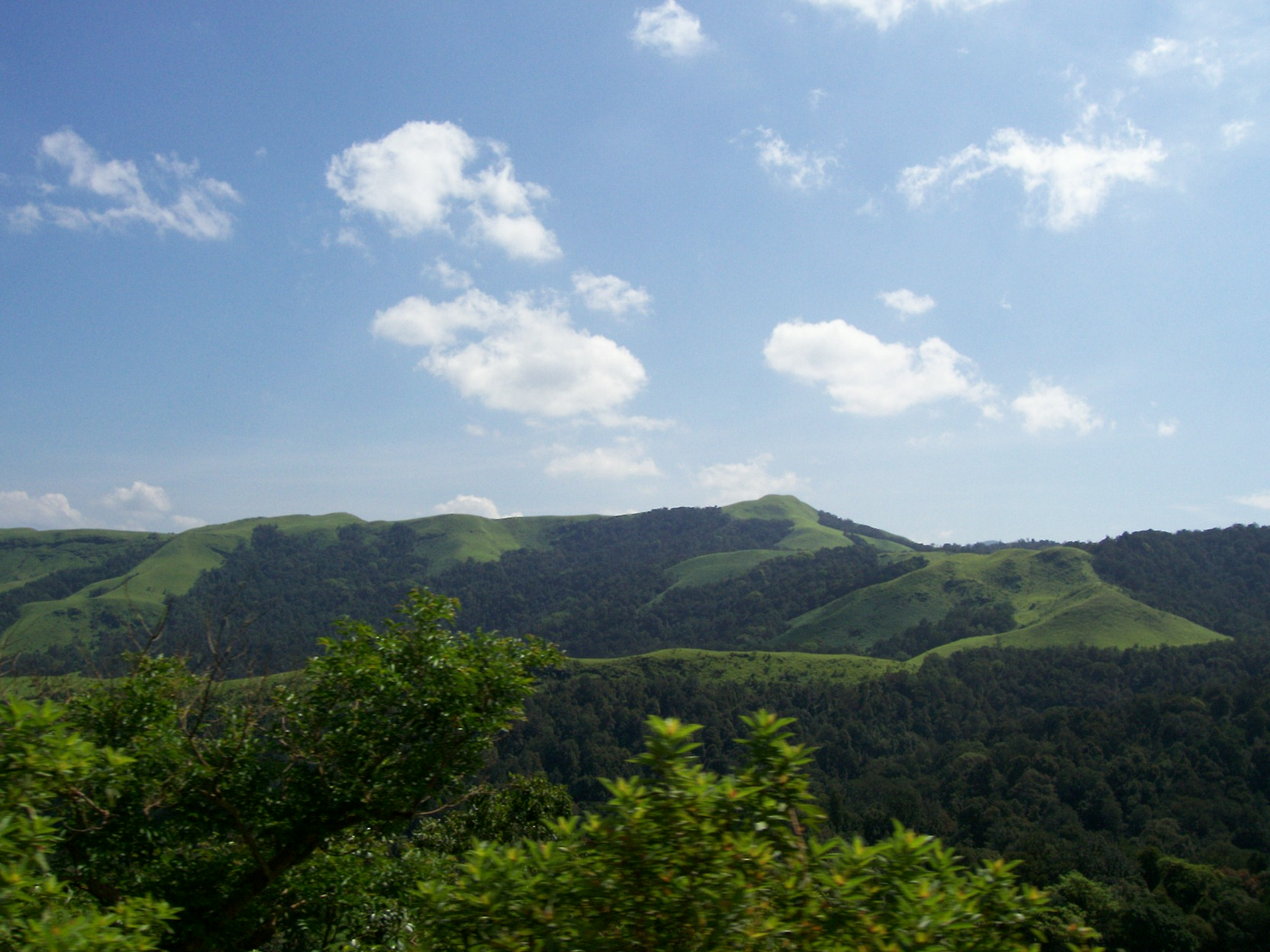
Hoysala country, malnad Karnataka

The Hoysala Kingdom (Kannada: ಹೊಯ್ಸಳ ಸಾಮ್ರಾಜ್ಯ) was a notable South Indian Kannadiga kingdom that ruled most of the modern-day state of Karnataka between the 10th to the 14th centuries. The capital of the kingdom was initially based at Belur, and later transferred to Halebidu. Economy of Hoysala kingdom was primarily based on agriculture though business within India as well as foreign trade flourished to some extent.

== Agriculture ==
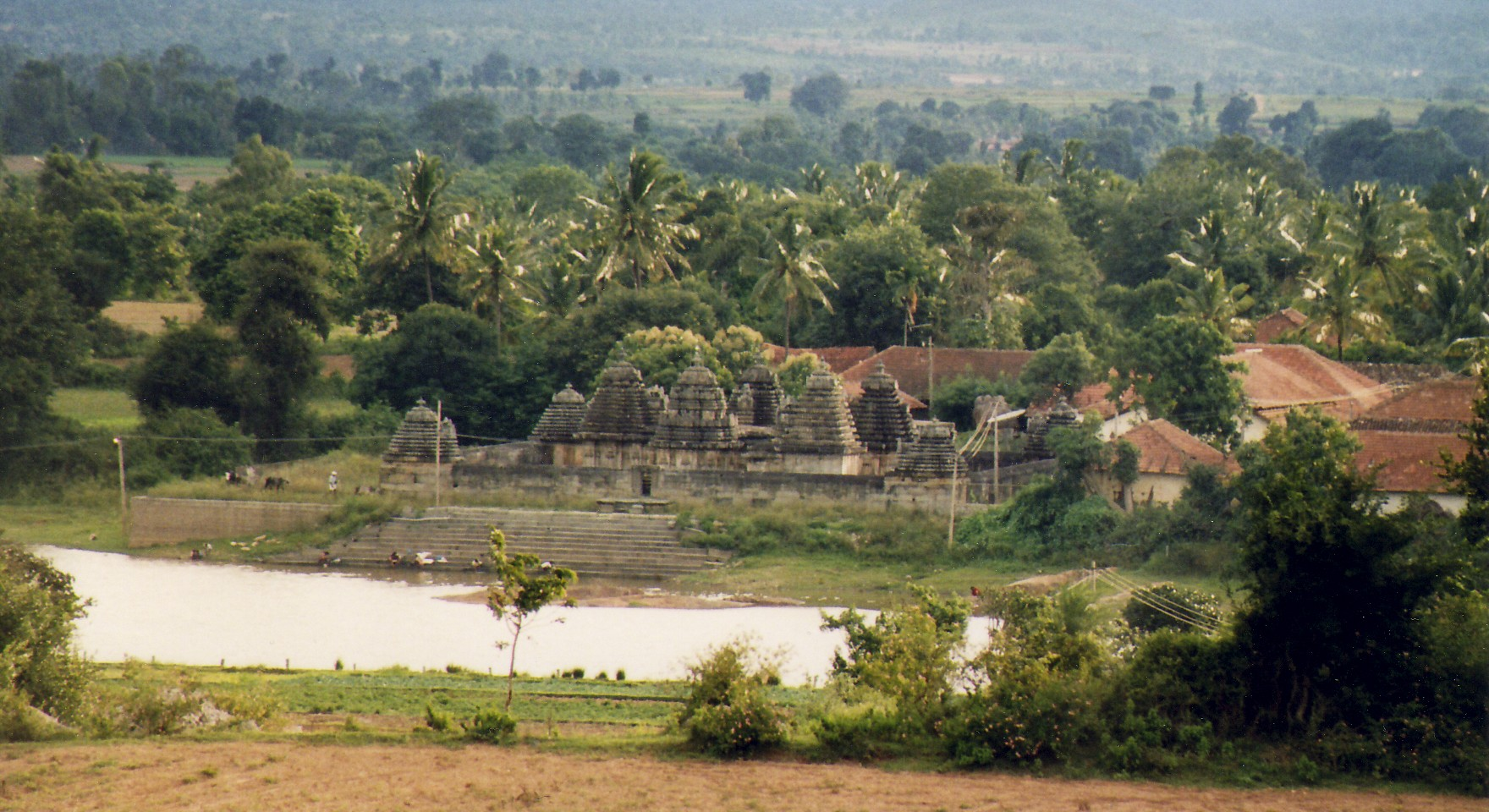
Country side in Doddagaddavalli near Belur

The administration sustained itself through agriculture. Land grants were made by the kings to religious beneficiaries like Brahmins, Jains and persons rewarded for services rendered to the king. The type of land grant was generally wetland which was already under cultivation. This was popular in the fertile river valleys of the Tungabhadra and Kaveri. In addition, clearing of forests for cultivation was viewed favourably as it not only brought new sources of revenue but also created job opportunities for the landless and introduced forest dwellers to a more agrarian life style. Whenever land was cleared for cultivation, it was on a large scale. Knowledge of agriculture included assessing irrigation systems like tanks, reservoirs with sluices, canals and wells which were built and maintained at the expense of local villagers. The more impressive irrigation tanks such as Vishnusagara, Shantisagara, Ballalarayasagara were created at the expense of the state. Irrespective of whether the expense and control came from local or state bodies, organising labour to till the land was taken up at the village and across village levels and the job of cultivation was largely that of the landless. The highlands (malnad regions) with its favourable climate was suitable for cattle farming, orchards and spices. Paddy and corn were staple crops in the plains (Bailnad). In Kannada country, key figures in rural areas were the rich land owners called gavunda or gauda and heggade. They are mentioned in inscriptions relating to land transactions, maintenance of irrigation, collection of taxes and works of village council. The gavunda of people (praja gavunda) was lower in status than the wealthy lord of gavundas (prabhu gavunda). The gavundas sometimes had a dual role as village representatives and appointees of the state. Some judicial responsibilities were also included like raising a militia if required.

== Imports and Exports ==
Import of horses on the western seaboard was a flourishing business and inscriptions speak of Brahmin merchants who were active. Arabs made wealth from the unending need for horses from Indian kingdoms. Rich forest produce like Teak was exported through ports of present-day Kerala. Merchants from this region settled down in Arasikere and Halebidu in addition to Jain traders. Virgal (hero stone) in the coastal areas depict ships indicating active sea trade with shipping fleets. Piracy was common and Virgals made for fallen heroes have been found. Inscriptions mention a flourishing textile industry. Trade with overseas kingdoms reached unprecedented levels. Sung dynasty records from China mention Indian merchants in ports of South China. Chinese interest in Indian astrology and Alchemy is well known. South India exported textiles, spices, medicinal plants, precious stones, pottery, salt made from salt pans, jewels, gold, ivory, Rhino horn, ebony and camphor to China. The same products reached ports like Dhofar, Aden. In addition, aloe wood, perfumes, Sandalwood and condiments reached western ports like Siraf which was the entry port to Egypt, Arabia and Persia. Cairo and Alexandria were in active trade across the Arabian Sea. Architects (Vishwakarmas), sculptors, quarry workers, goldsmiths and others whose trade directly or indirectly related to construction of temples were also prosperous due to the vigorous temple building activities undertaken.

== Tax system ==
Tax assessment was done by the village assembly who were responsible for collecting for the government. Land revenue was called Siddhaya and included original assessment (Kula) and various cesses. Cesses were collected in proportion to Kula. Taxes were levied on professions, marriage, goods in transit on chariots, carriages, domesticated animals. Taxes on commodities like gold, precious stones, perfumes, Sandalwood, ropes, yarn, residence, hearth, shops, cattle pans, sugarcane presses and produce like black pepper, betel leaves, ghee, paddy, spices, palm leaves, coconuts and sugar are mentioned in records. Cattle tax was called balavana and loom tax was called maggadere. Fines for violating laws were also collected. The village assembly could levy tax for a specific purpose like construction of a water tanks.
