= Mallikarjuna Temple, Hirenallur =

Mallikarjuna Temple
- Hindu temple
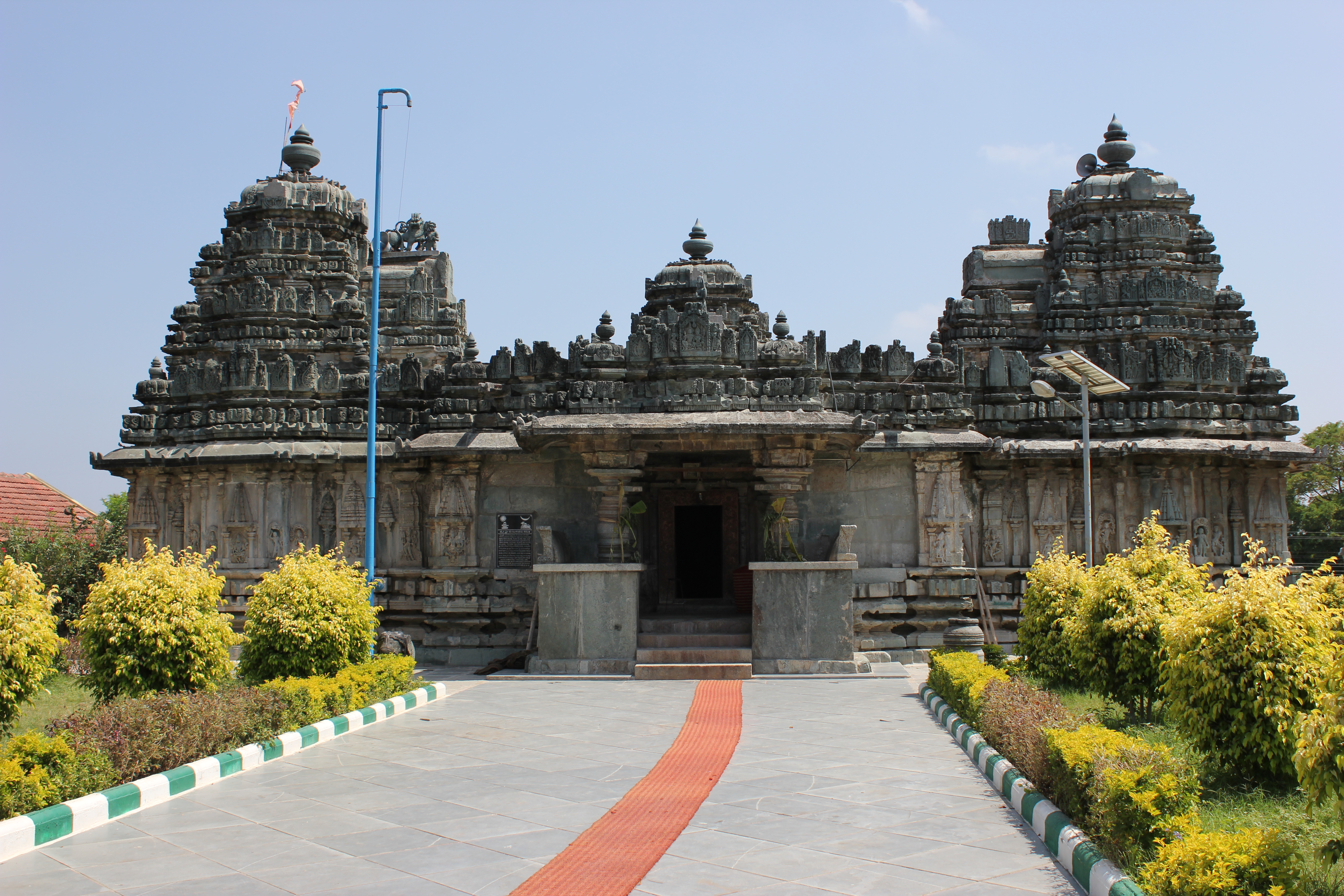
- Mallikarjuna temple (12th-13th century) Chikkamagaluru district
- Country: India
- State: Karnataka
- District: Chikkamagaluru District

Languages
  - Official: Kannada
- Time zone: UTC+5:30 (IST)

The Mallikarjuna Temple at Hirenallur is a Hoysala era construction. Hirenallur is a village, about 12 km from Kadur, Chikkamagaluru district, in the Karnataka state, India. The monument is protected by the Karnataka state division of Archaeological Survey of India. The monument which was in a state of dis-repair was renovated around 2004 by the "Sri Dharmasthala Manjunathaeshwara Dharmothana Trust", with assistance of the Department of Culture, Government of India.

== Gallery ==
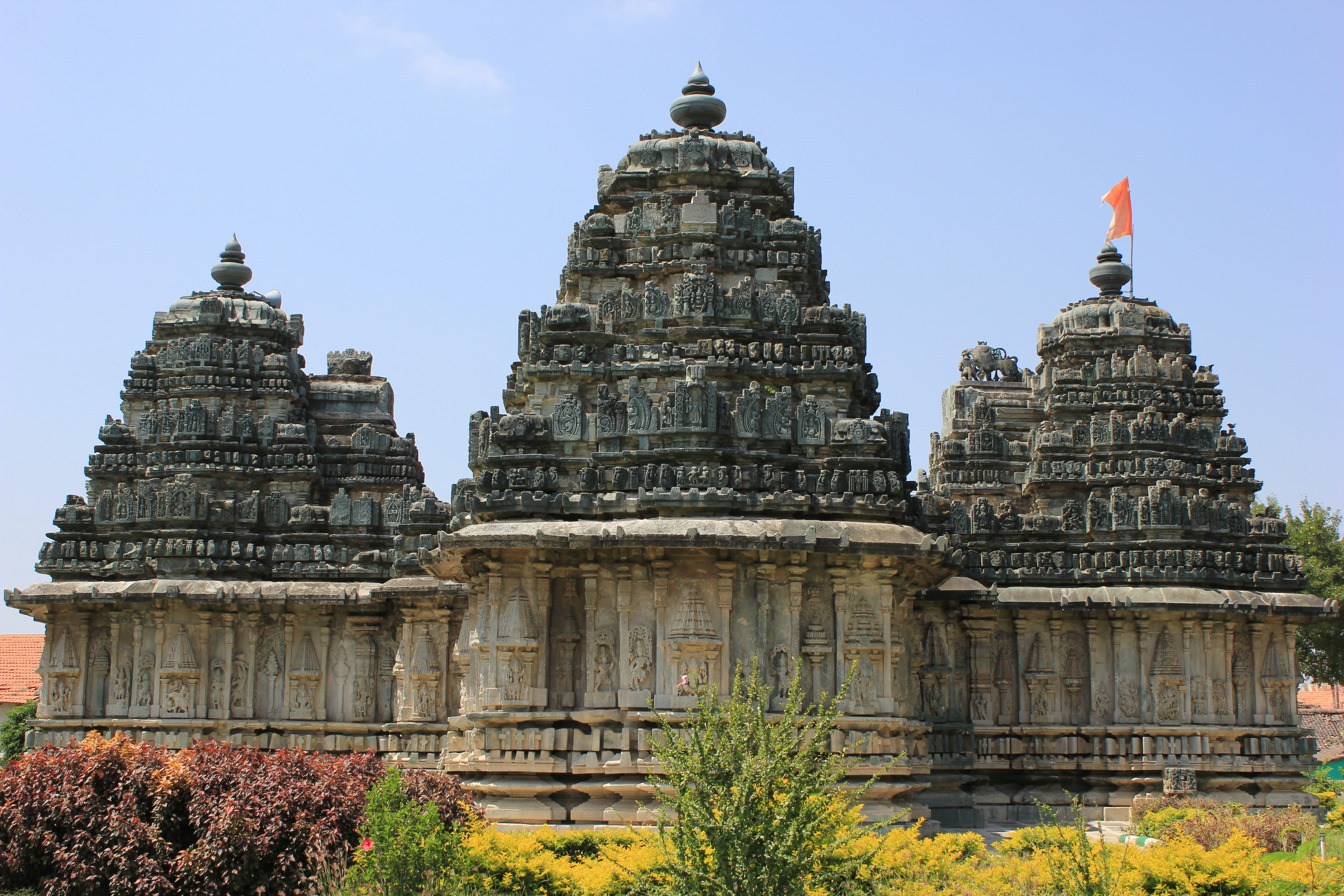
Rear view of trikutachala ("three towers") shrines in Mallikarjuna temple at Hirenallur

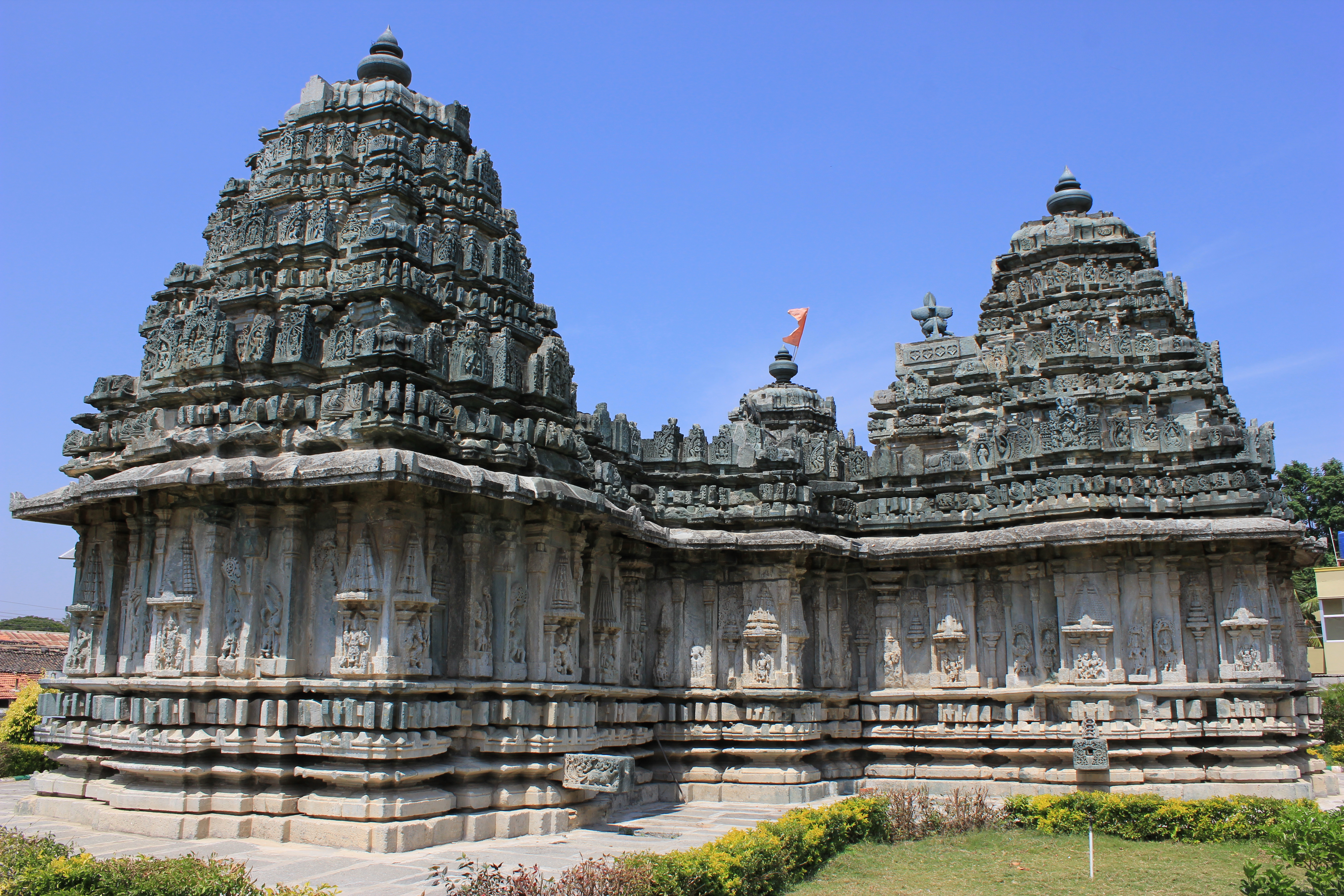
Rear profile of Mallikarjuna temple at Hirenallur

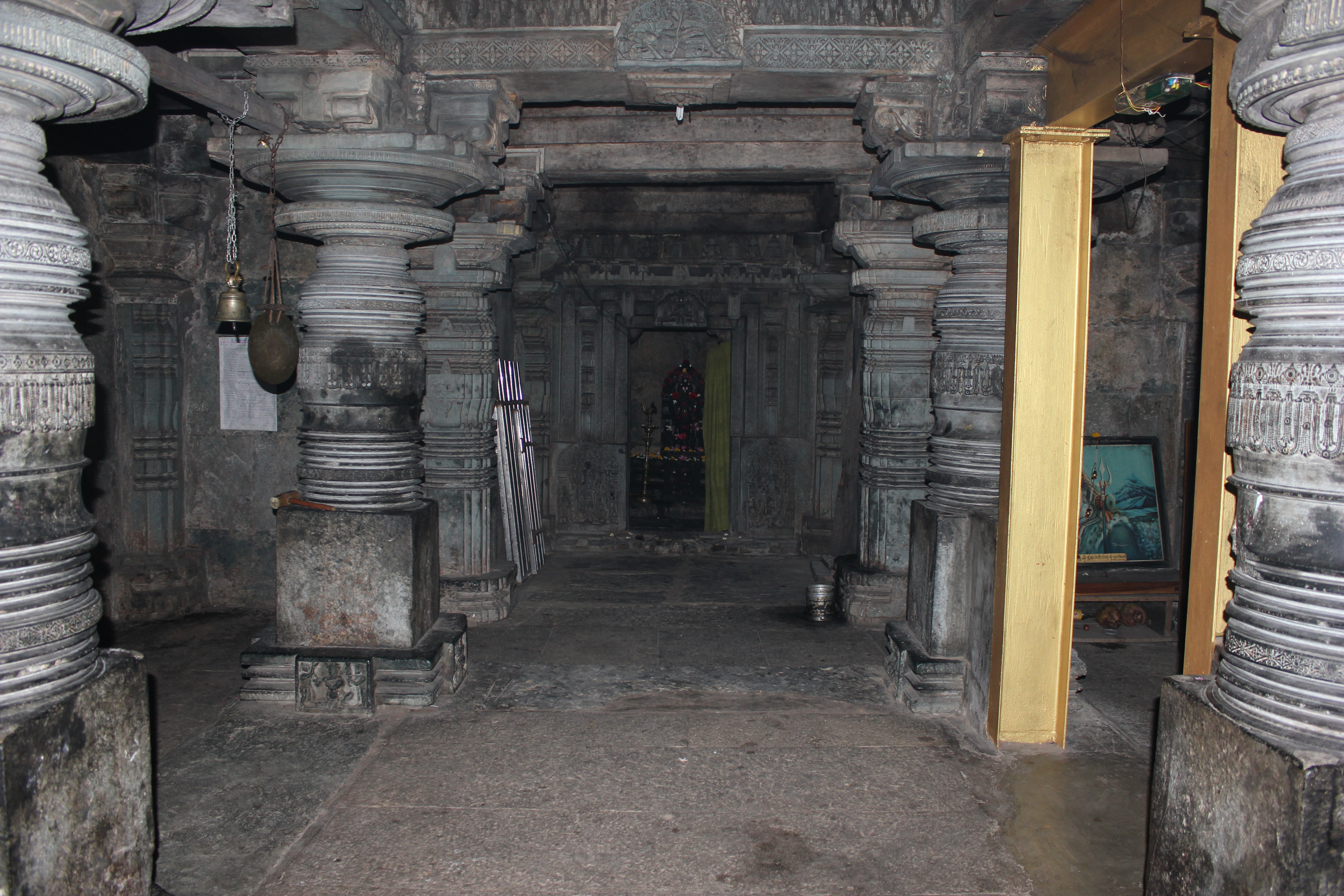
Closed mantapa (hall) connecting three shrines in Mallikarjuna temple at Hirenallur

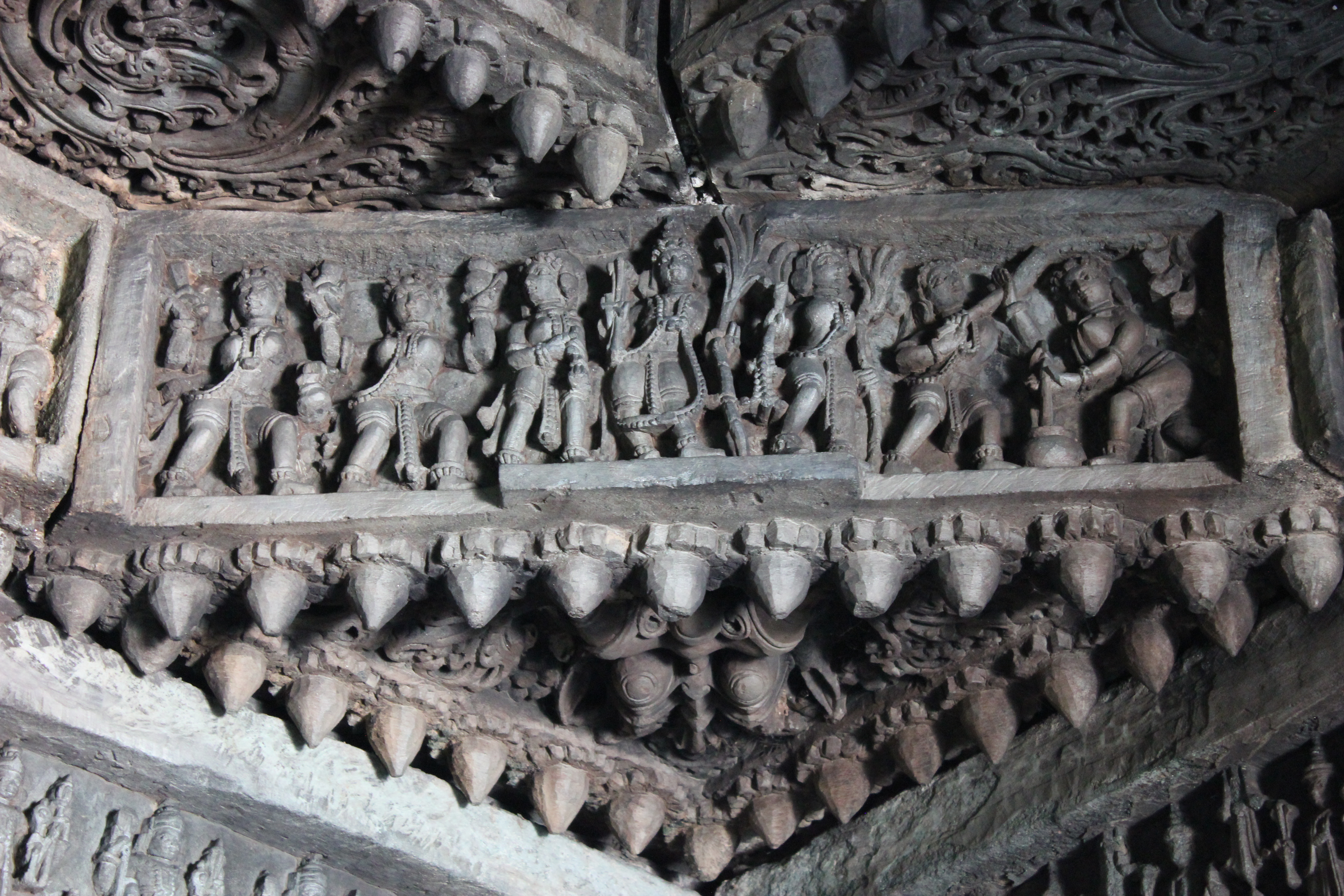
Themes from the Hindu lore in relief in the ceiling of the Mallikarjuna temple at Hirenallur

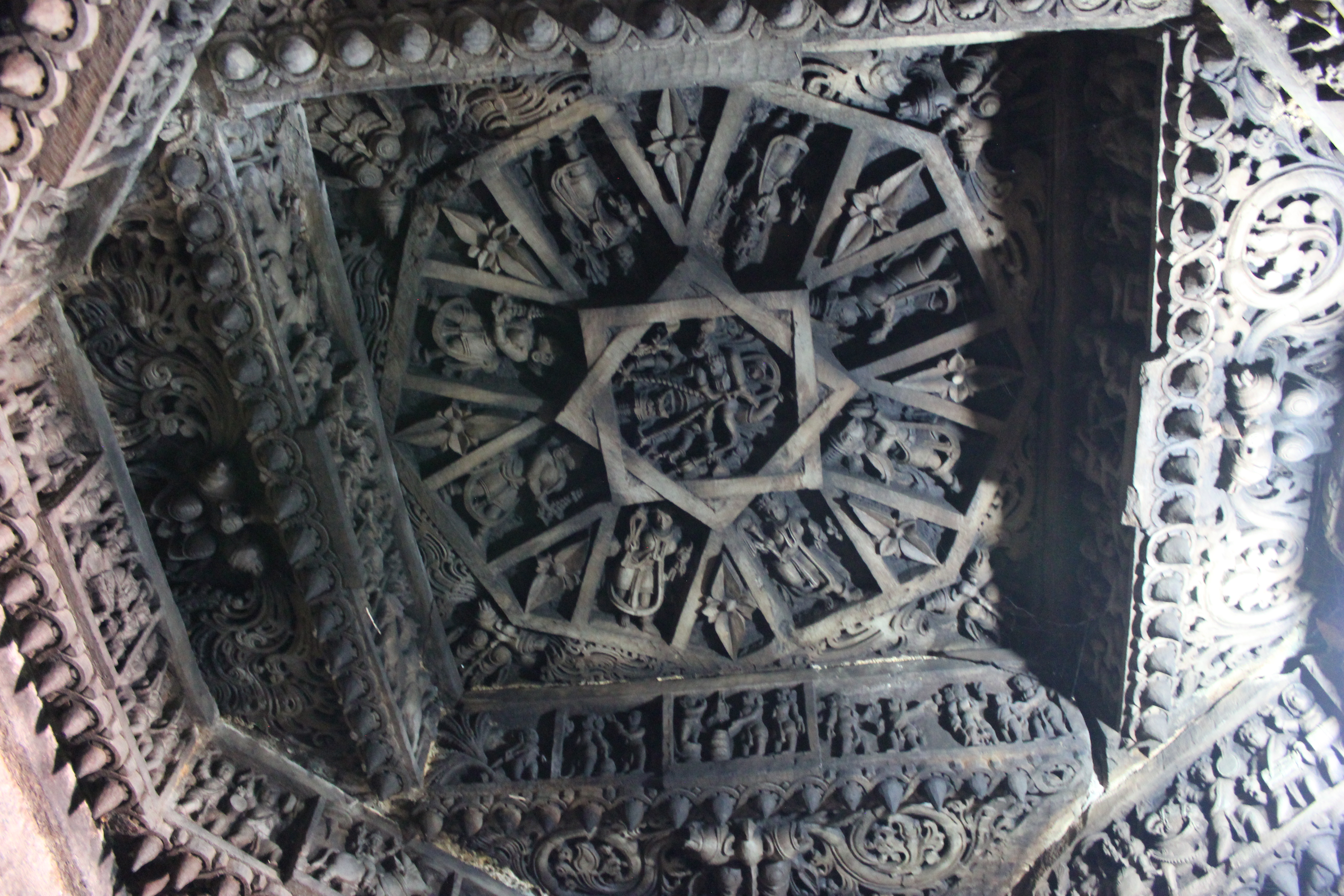
Ornate bay ceiling in Mallikarjuna temple at Hirenallur

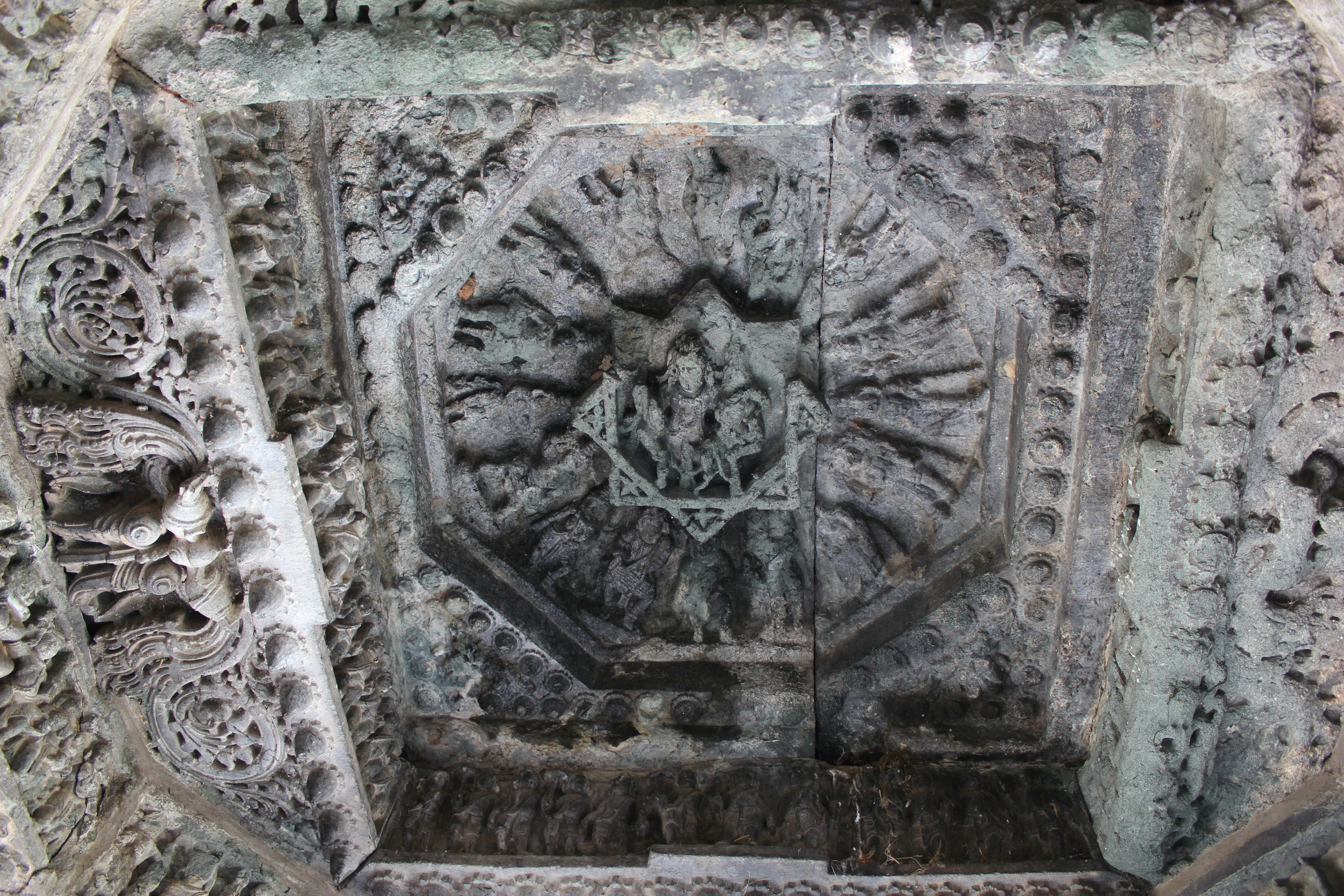
Ornate bay ceiling in Mallikarjuna temple at Hirenallur
