= Somanathapura =

Town in Mysuru, Karnataka India

Somanathapura Mysuru
- Somanathapura Town Mysuru
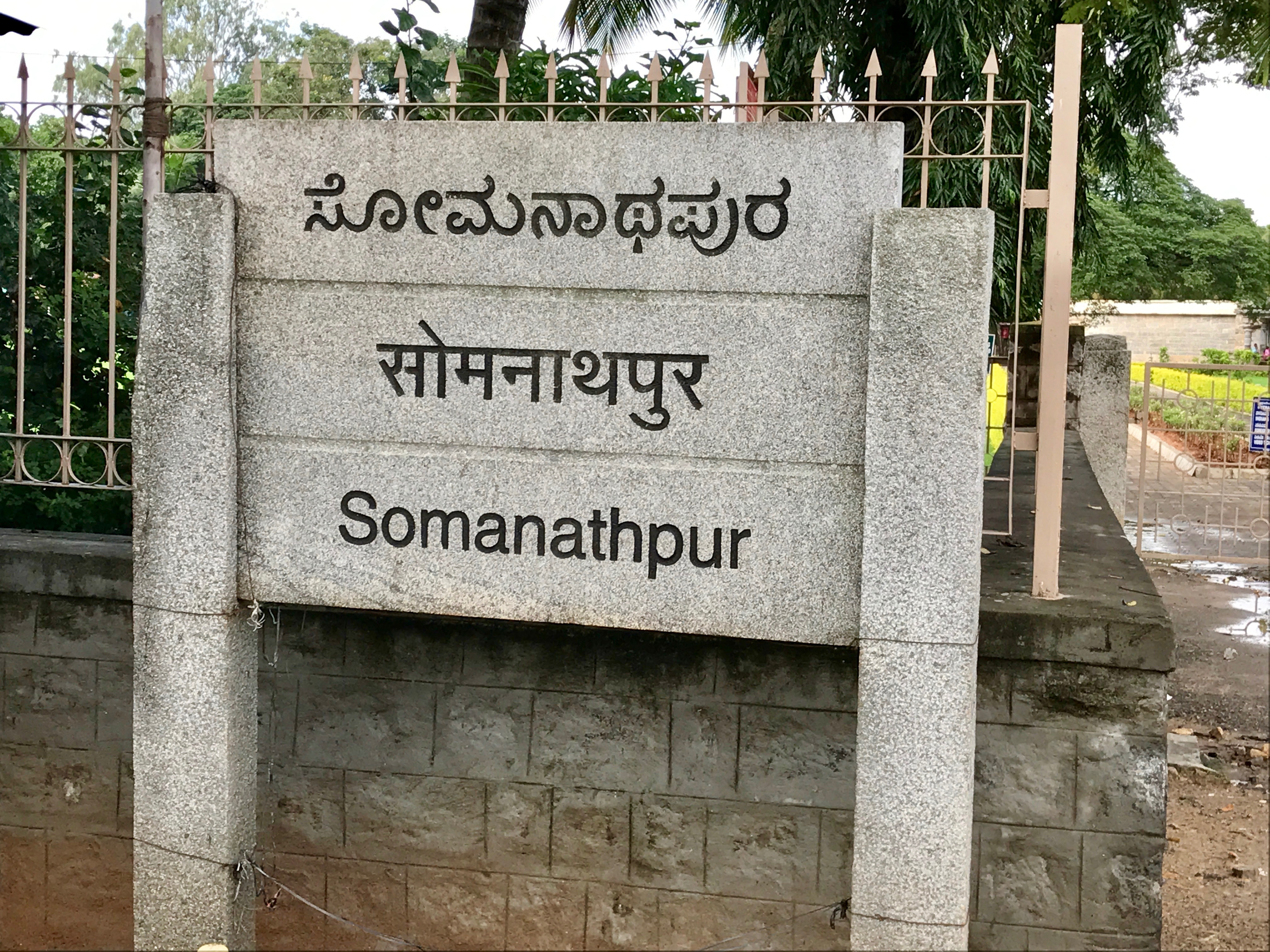
- Keshava Temple is Somanathapura Mysuru
- Nickname: Temple Town Somanathapura
- Location Somanathapura Mysuru India
- Coordinates: 12°16′32.86″N 76°52′53.78″E
- Country: India
- State: Karnataka
- District: Mysuru

Government
  - Body: Nagar Palika
- Elevation: 963 m (3,159 ft)

Population
  - Total: 6,692

Languages
  - Official: Kannada, English
- Time zone: UTC+5:30 (IST)
- Postal code: 571120
- ISO 3166 code: IN-KA
- Vehicle registration: KA-09 KA-55
- Nearest city: Mysuru
- Website: https://karnataka.gov.in

Somanathapura, also spelled Somnathpur temple or Somanathpura is a town in T Narasipura Taluk, Mysore district in the state of Karnataka in India. It is located 38 kilometres (24 mi) from the city of Mysuru and houses the Chennakeshava Temple (also called Keshava temple) built in 1258 AD. The temple was recognised as a UNESCO World Heritage Site in 2023. The town's name holds a strong connection to the Somnath Temple, in which it shares the name "Somnath" or "Somanath."

== Demographics ==
According to the 2011 Indian Census, the town consists of 4,692 people. The town has a literacy rate of 86.11 percent which is higher than Karnataka's average of 75.36 percent.

Total Number of Household : 1112
Population	Persons	Males	Females
Total	9,692	5,348	4,344
In the age group 0–6 years	501	266	235
Scheduled Castes (SC)	671	335	336
Scheduled Tribes (ST)	1,258	635	623
Literates	2,633	1,393	1,240
Illiterate	2,059	955	1,104
Total Worker	1,830	1,482	348
Main Worker	1,551	1,306	245
Main Worker - Cultivator	539	526	13
Main Worker - Agricultural Labourers	510	368	142
Main Worker - Household Industries	17	15	2
Main Worker - Other	485	397	88
Marginal Worker	279	176	103
Marginal Worker - Cultivator	24	19	5
Marginal Worker - Agriculture Labourers	121	76	45
Marginal Worker - Household Industries	5	4	1
Marginal Workers - Other	129	77	52
Marginal Worker (3-6 Months)	232	159	73
Marginal Worker - Cultivator (3-6 Months)	20	15	5
Marginal Worker - Agriculture Labourers (3-6 Months)	99	72	27
Marginal Worker - Household Industries (3-6 Months)	4	4	0
Marginal Worker - Other (3-6 Months)	109	68	41
Marginal Worker (0-3 Months)	47	17	30
Marginal Worker - Cultivator (0-3 Months)	4	4	0
Marginal Worker - Agriculture Labourers (0-3 Months)	22	4	18
Marginal Worker - Household Industries (0-3 Months)	1	0	1
Marginal Worker - Other Workers (0-3 Months)	20	9	11
Non Worker	2,862	866	1,996

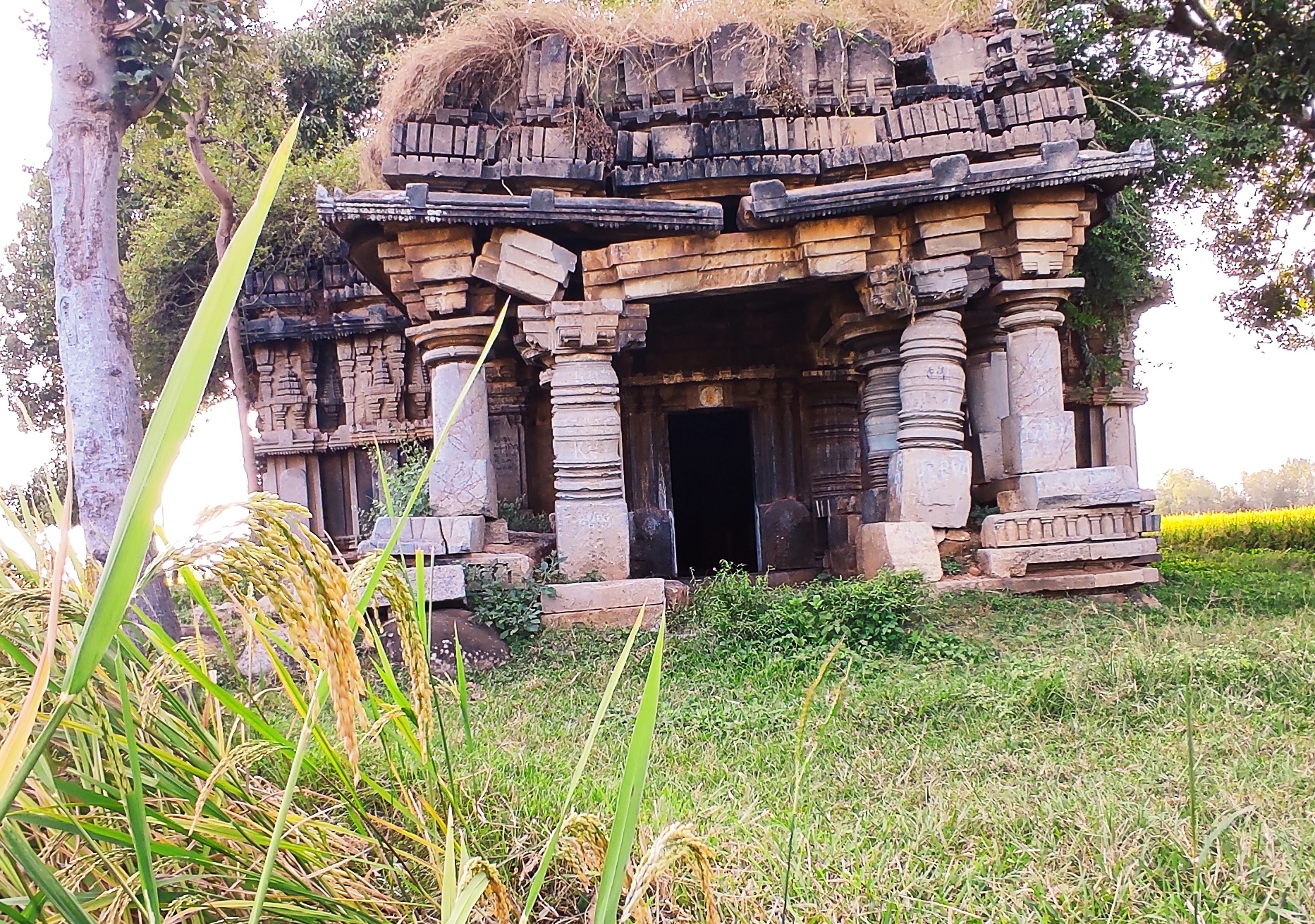
Mondasaale temple, an ancient unnoticed temple, in the middle of paddy fields in Somanathapura
