= Jagati (temple) =

Hindu temple architecture

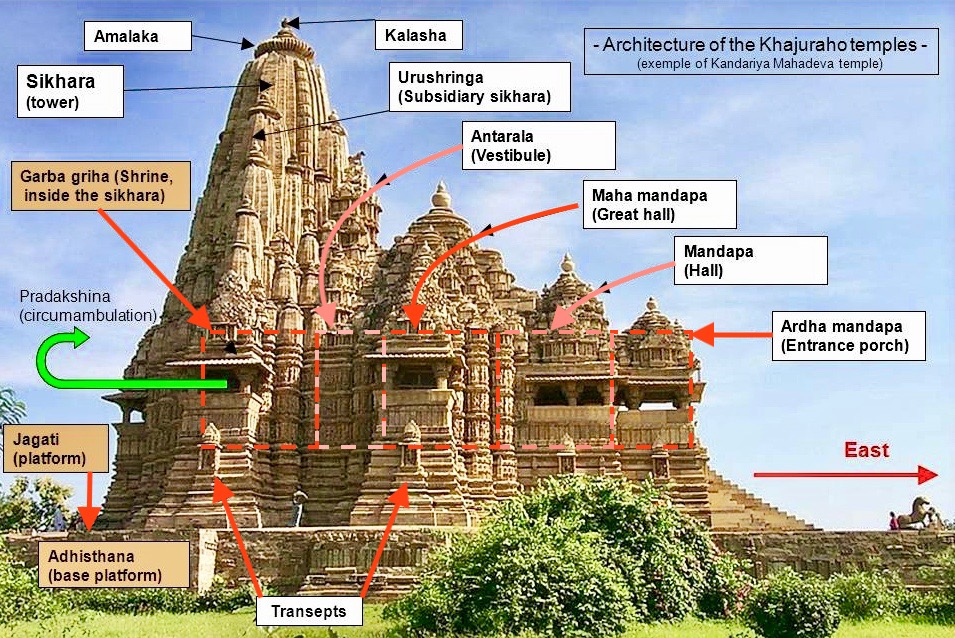
Architecture of Khajuraho temples with the Kandariya Mahadeva Temple built on a jagati

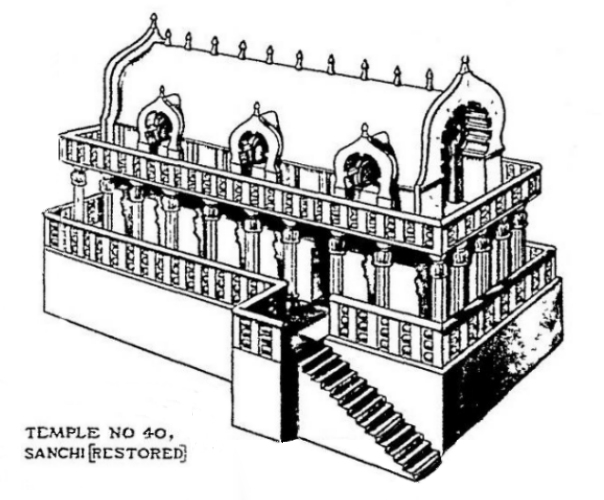
Conjectural reconstruction of the wooden Temple 40, burnt down in the 2nd century BCE at Sanchi.

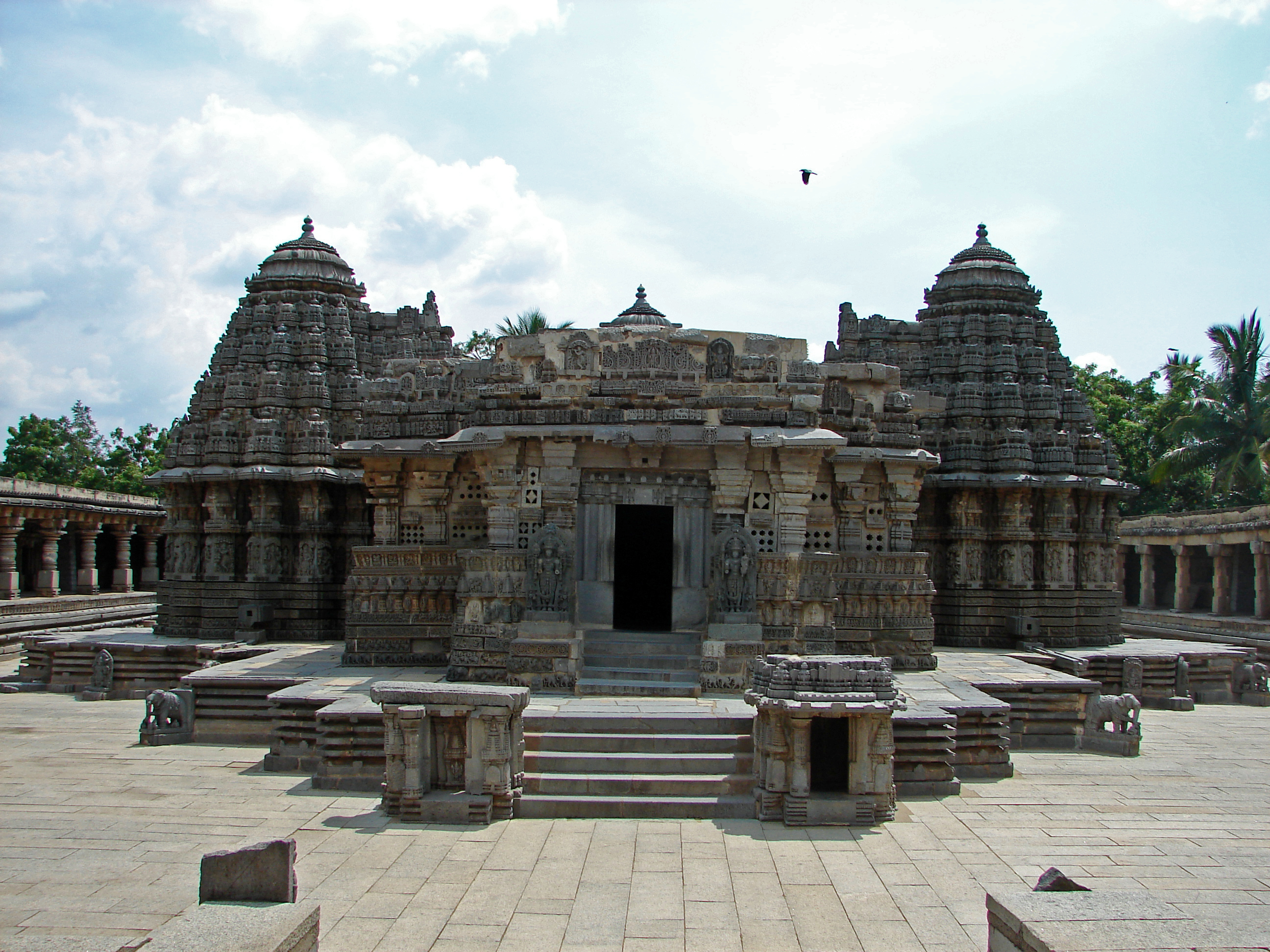
Symmetrical architecture on a jagati at Somanathapura

In Hindu temple architecture, the jagati is the raised surface of the platform or terrace upon which Hindu, Jain, and Buddhist temples are built.

This feature is one of the five features that can be seen in temples of the Hoysalas.

This feature is seen in temples such as the temples of Khajuraho. It is often not seen in temples enclosed by walls.

The jagati lies on a platform or base called adhiṣṭhāna (among other terms from various languages) which adds to its height. The sides of the adhishthana are often ornamented with relief sculptures, or deep-cut mouldings. In English this may be called by terms from Western Greco-Roman classical architecture including base, plinth and socle. Not all adhisthana lead to a jagati platform; some just follow the walls of the temple buildings, except where there are steps up to the floor level of the temple.

The jagati also allows for ritual circumambulation, i.e. the walking of devotees around the shrine, which is important in both Hinduism, Buddhism and Jainism. In some large temples, this circumambulation is also possible inside the temple along a walled passage around the shrine sanctum named pradakshina.
