= Chennakeshava Temple, Somanathapura =

13th-century Hindu temple in Karnataka, India

Chennakesava Temple (ಶ್ರೀ ಚೆನ್ನಕೇಶವ ದೇವಸ್ಥಾನ)
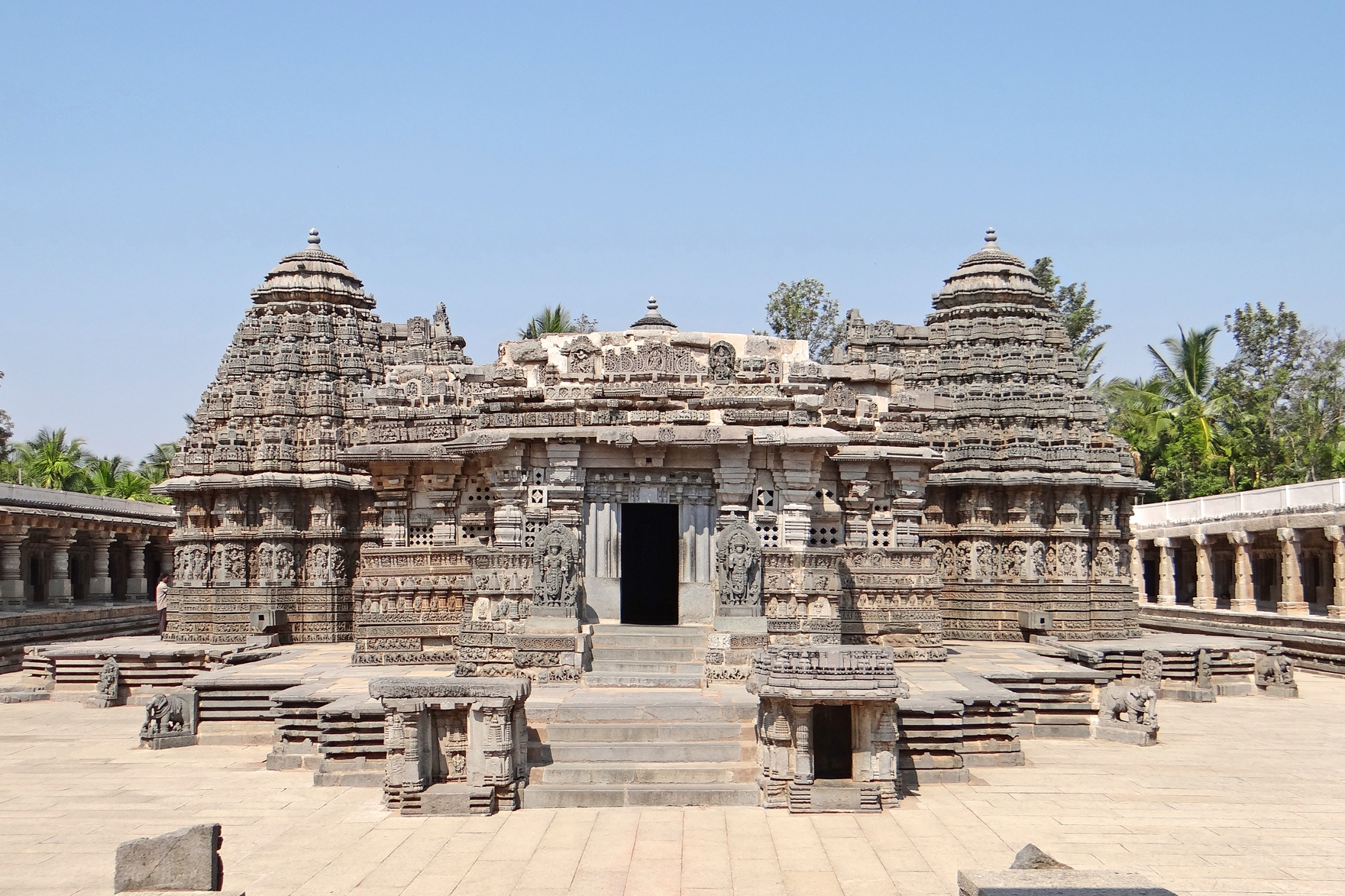
- Keshava temple at Somanathpura (also spelled Keshava temple, Somnathpur)

- Location within India Location within Karnataka

Religion
- Affiliation: Hinduism
- Deity: Keshava (Vishnu)

Location
- Location: Somanathapura, Mysuru, India
- Interactive map of Chennakesava Temple (ಶ್ರೀ ಚೆನ್ನಕೇಶವ ದೇವಸ್ಥಾನ)
- Coordinates: 12°16′32.49″N 76°52′53.95″E

Architecture
- Type: Hoysala architecture
- Creator: Somanatha Dandanayaka
- Completed: 1258

UNESCO World Heritage Site
- Official name: Sacred Ensembles of the Hoysalas
- Type: Cultural
- Criteria: i, ii, iv
- Designated: 2023 (45th session)
- Reference no.: 1670

The Chennakesava Temple, also referred to as Chennakeshava Temple and Keshava Temple, is a Vaishnava Hindu temple on the banks of River Kaveri at Somanathapura, Mysuru, Karnataka, India. The temple was consecrated in 1258 CE by Somanatha Dandanayaka, a general of the Hoysala King Narasimha III. It is located 38 kilometres (24 mi) east of Mysuru city. (Note: Some sources mention 1268 CE based on an inscription found in a nearby Shiva temple, but most scholars state that that inscription is better interpreted that the temple was operating in 1268. Other inscriptions suggest the 1258 CE and this year is found in scholarly sources.)

The ornate temple is a model illustration of the Hoysala architecture. The temple is enclosed in a courtyard with a pillared corridor of small shrines (damaged). The main temple in the center is on a high star-shaped platform with three symmetrical sanctums (garbha-griha), set in a square matrix (89' x 89') oriented along the east–west and north–south axes. The western sanctum was for a statue of Kesava (missing), the northern sanctum of Janardhana and the southern sanctum of Venugopala, all forms of Vishnu. The sanctums share a common community hall (sabha-mandapa) with many pillars. The outer walls, the inner walls, the pillars and the ceiling of the temple are intricately carved with theological iconography of Hinduism and display extensive friezes of Hindu texts such as the Ramayana (southern section), the Mahabharata (northern section) and the Bhagavata Purana (western section of the main temple).

The Chennakesava temple, states author George Michell, represents the climax of the development in Hoysala temple style and yet is also unique in many ways.

In 2023, the Somanathapura temple, along with the Hoysaleswara Temple at Halebidu and the Chennakeshava Temple at Belur, was declared a World Heritage Site by UNESCO as part of the Sacred Ensembles of the Hoysalas.

== History ==
The Somanathapura town was founded in the 13th century by a general named Somanatha (Someya Dandanayaka in some inscriptions). He was working for the Hoysala King Narasimha III. Somanatha created an Agrahara, that is granted land to Brahmins and dedicated resources to build and maintain temples therein. The town (pura) became known after the name of the patron, Somanatha-pura. The location is also referred by alternate spellings, such as Somnathpur.

In the middle of the new settlement, Somanatha built the Kesava temple and consecrated it in 1258 CE. This was a Vaishnavism tradition temple. In addition to this temple, Somanatha consecrated a Shaivism tradition related Panchalinga temple (literally, "five linga temple") in the east-northeast corner of the land grant. He also built a fort wall around the land, but these are now in ruins. According to the inscriptions and textual evidence, Somanatha additionally built the Purahara, Narasimhesvara, Murahara, Lakshminarasimha and Yoganarayana temples in Hoysala style in the region, but all these temples except the Lakshminarasimha have disappeared, after wars between the Hindu kingdoms and Muslim Sultanates ravaged the region. The Lakshminarasimha temple is also in ruins. From the other disappeared temples, the sanctum image of Yoganarayana temple is only known surviving artwork, but it too is in a damaged form.

The Kesava temple too was badly damaged, according to 15th-century inscriptions. It was repaired in the 16th century with financial support and grants by the emperors of the Vijayanagara Empire. The repairs are evidenced by the different color of stones and quality of work in the veranda and parts of the northern tower and platform of the main temple. The repaired temple was damaged in the 19th century, then repaired again in the early 20th century by the colonial era Mysore government.

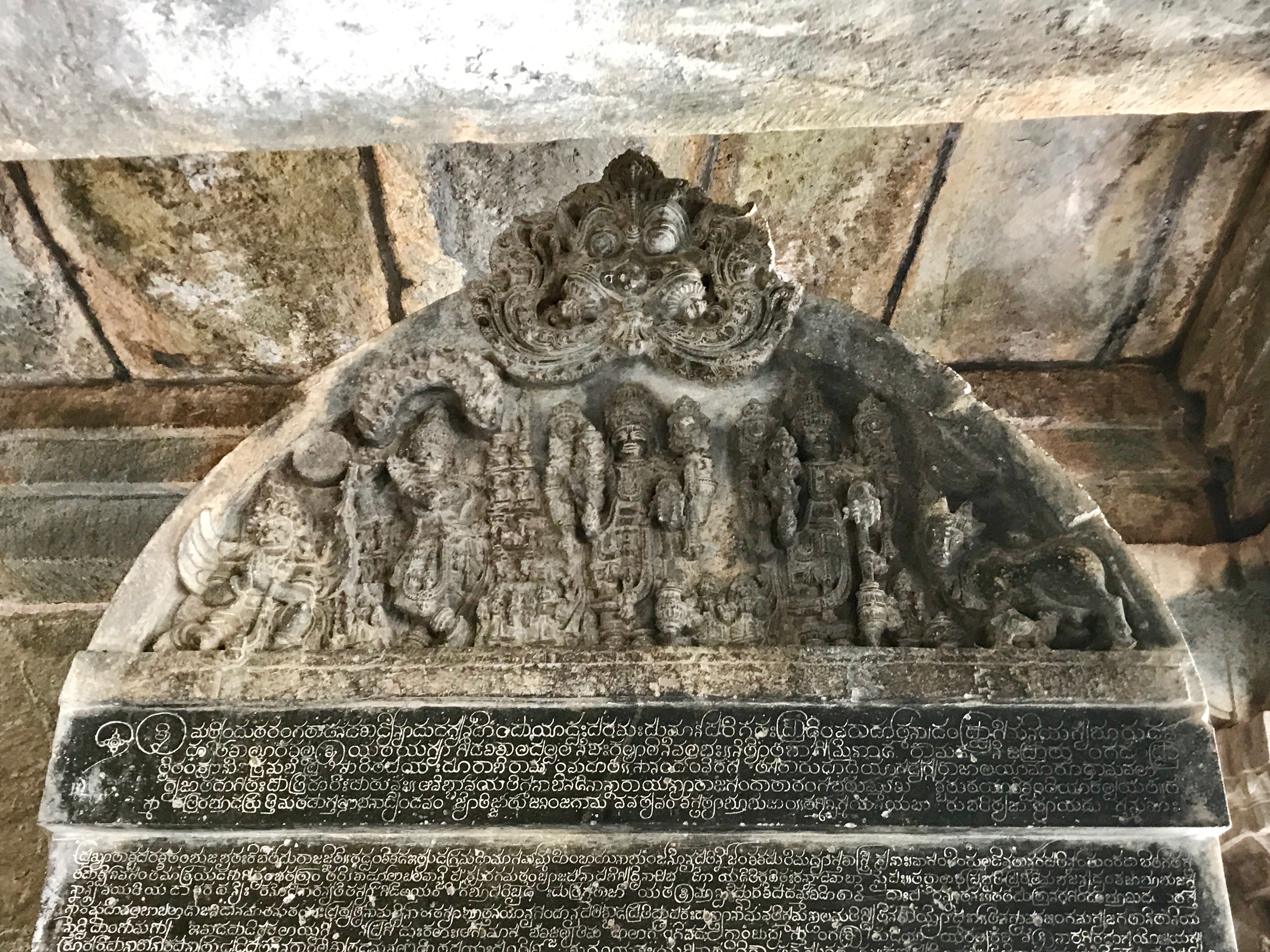
A part of the Kannada inscription of about c.1268 at Keshava temple entrance.

The Kesava temple is one of some 1,500 Hindu and Jain temples built by the Hoysala Empire kings in different parts of their kingdom. The other well studied Hoysala temples include those at Belur and Halebidu.

The temple was destroyed during Muslim attacks in the Hoysala kingdoms. The first attack was by Malik Kafur, Alauddin Khilji's general in 1311 and in 1326 Muhammad Bin Tughlaq destroyed the remaining structures. Some parts of the temples were restored by Vijayanagara Kings and later by Wodeyars of Mysuru.

=== Inscriptions ===
A few of the significant historical dates and circumstances around the Kesava temple is inscribed in eight stones in different parts of South India. Four of the inscriptions are found on soapstone slabs at the entrance of the temple. Two inscriptions are found in the ceilings of the veranda that surrounds the temple, one near the southeast corner and the other about the northwest corner. Another inscription is found near Harihareshwara Temple on the banks of the Tungabhadra River. The eighth inscription is found in the Shiva temple at the periphery of the original land grant, the Panchalinga temple. Most of these inscriptions confirm that the temple was operational about mid 13th century. Two inscriptions, one dated 1497 CE and another to 1550 CE describe the damage and the repairs done to this temple.

The temple has numerous small inscriptions which are either logo of the mason guilds or the name of the artist who carved the block, pillar or artwork.

== Description ==
Keshava, Janardhana and Venugopala are names found in the Bhagavad Gita, all in the context of Krishna. The term Chennakeśava means "handsome Keshava". The Keshava temple at the Somanathapura is a temple of the Vaishnavism tradition within Hinduism, and one of many Keshava temples built in or before the 13th century in different parts of India, as well as in Belur in 1117 CE about 170 kilometres (110 mi) away.

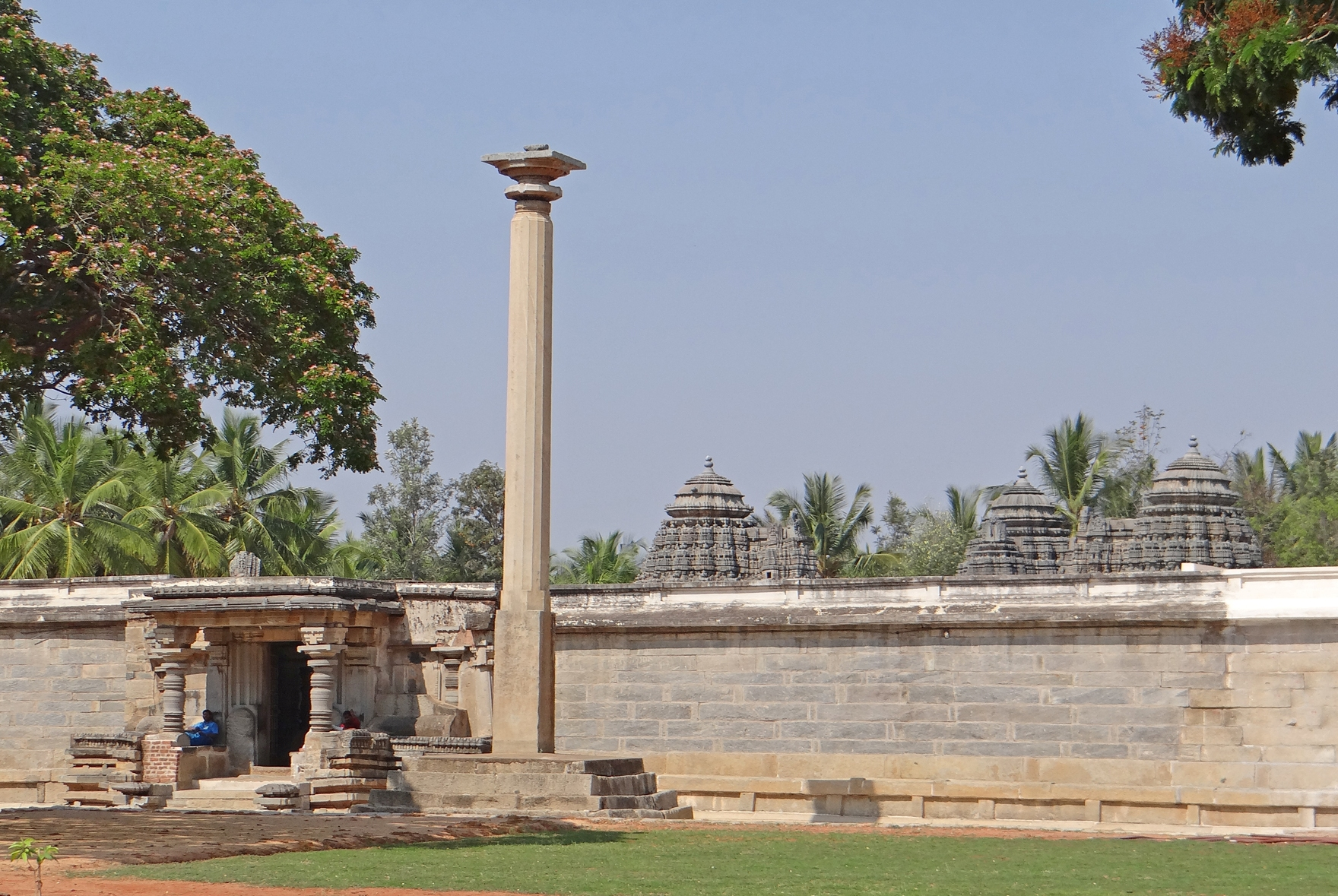
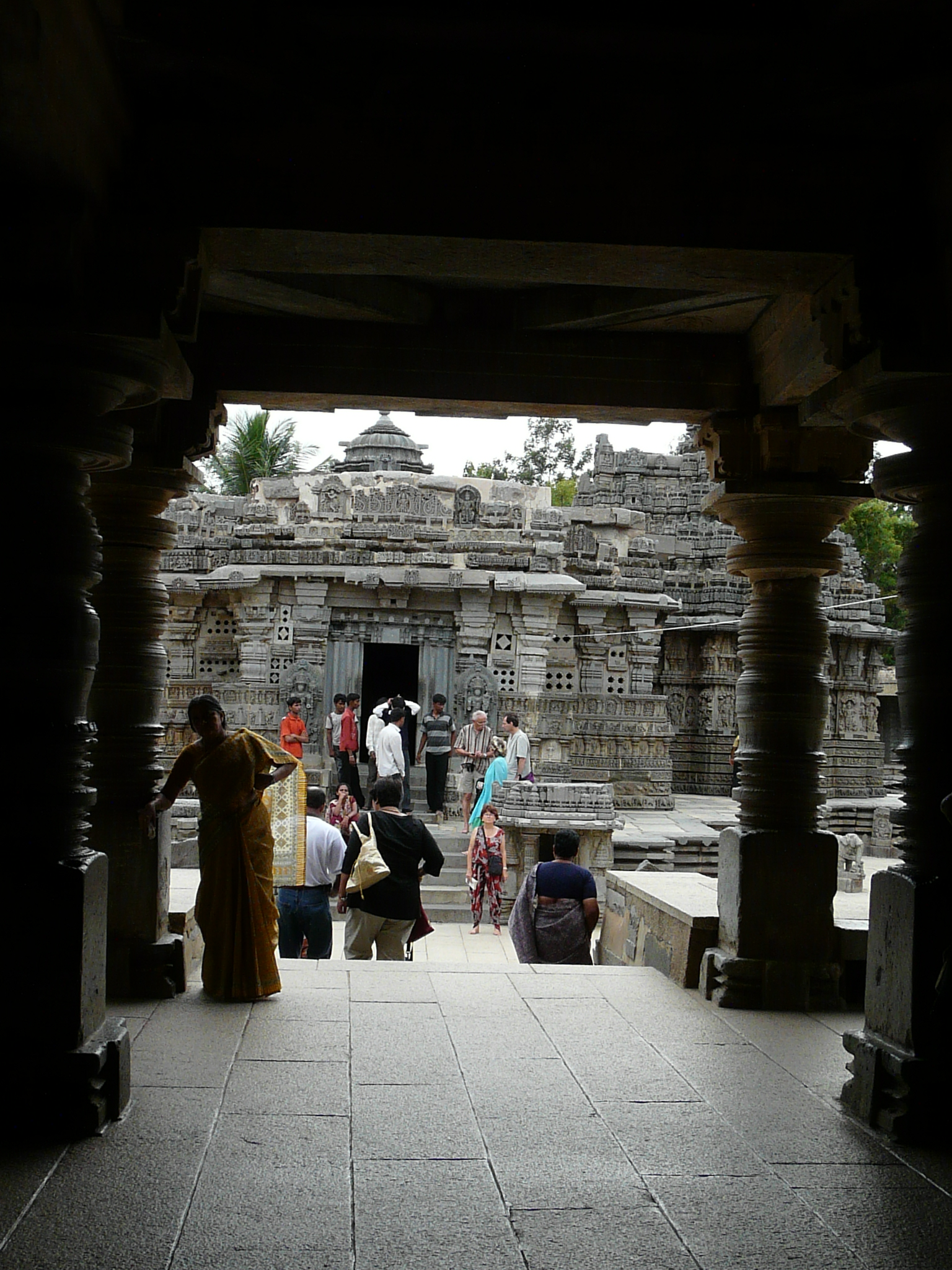
Stambha before the gate of the temple (left); the view of the temple from the mantapa with inscription rocks.

The Keshava temple at Somanathapura faces east and is enclosed in a walled courtyard with a major gate (mahadvara). Outside the walls before the gate stands a tall pillar (stambha), which once had a Garuda statue on top, now missing. Inside the gate, to the left are vertical standing inscription stones. These stones have the form of the hero stones, with the top decorated with Hindu iconography as well as miniature reliefs of Keshava, Janardhana and Venugopala. The inscription is in old Kannada. The small entrance mandapa is supported by lathe-carved soapstone pillars. The temple is carved from soapstone, a green-grey chloritic schist material that is soft in quarry but hardens when exposed to air. This is not locally available and must have been imported from another part of South India. It enabled the artists to shape and carve out intricate details for the artwork.

The temple has a large open public courtyard surrounded by the walled enclosure, with the main three-towered temple in the center. The courtyard wall frames a rectangular veranda and an array of small shrines.

=== Architecture ===
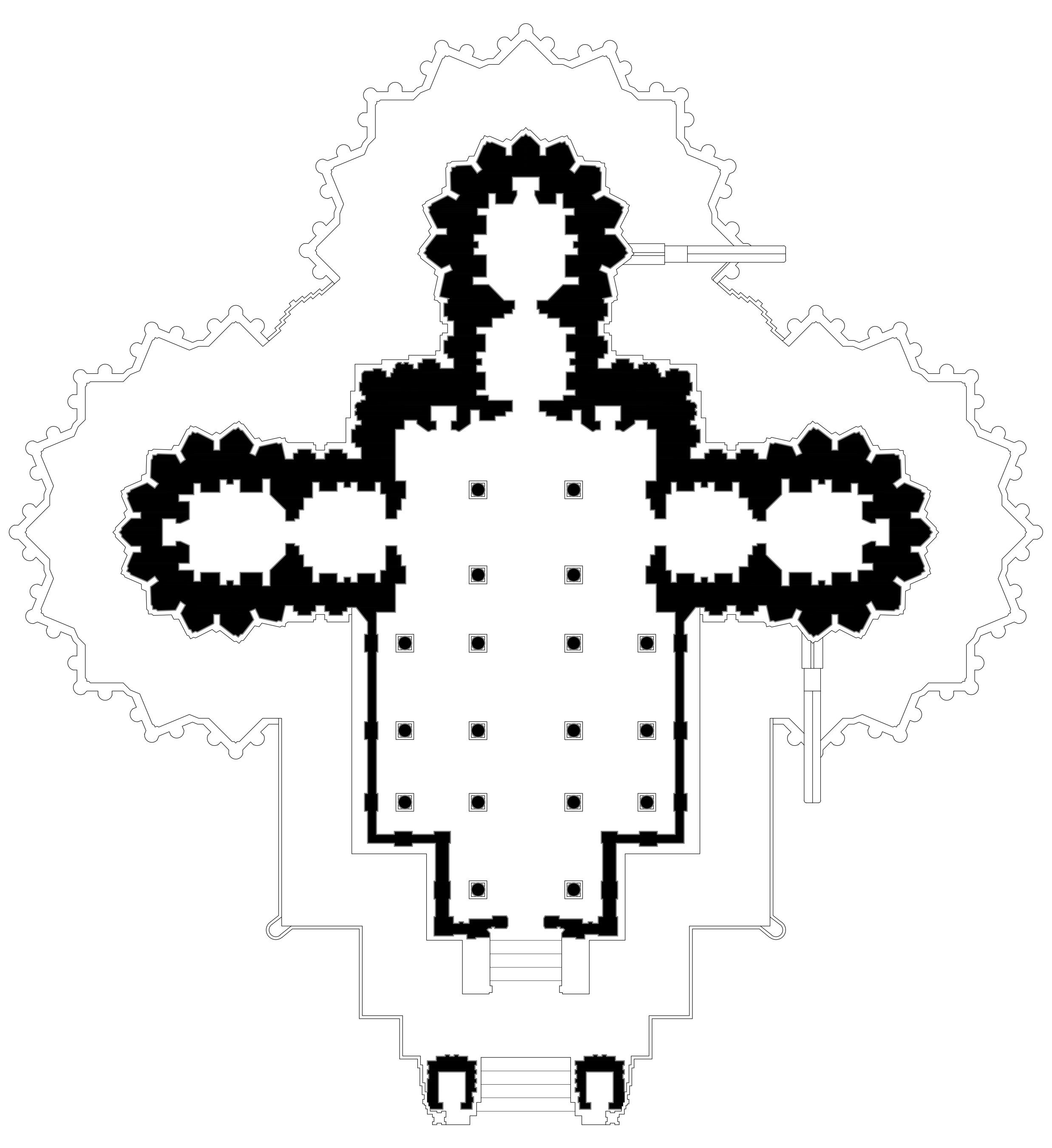
Floor plan of the Chennakesava temple, Somanathapura

The northern and southern row of small shrines inside the pillared courtyard corridor consists of eighteen single shrine and one linked-double shrine each. The linked-double shrine is at the northwestern and southwestern corners of the courtyard. The western row consists of fourteen small shrines, while the eastern row consists of eight single small shrines and two linked-double shrines. In total, the Kesava temple consists of 58 small 1x1 small shrines, 4 small 2x1 linked-double shrines, 2 near entrance, and the main central temple. The 64 corridor shrines once featured Vedic and Puranic deities and rooms for pilgrims. The statues in the smaller shrines were defaced, their limbs broken or destroyed. Some of the recovered broken pieces are in a heap inside the temple. The collection includes Jaina statues in the Kayotsarga posture as well as numerous Hindu statues. The ceilings of the southern array of shrines have carvings on their ceilings, the western array of shrines do not and have a repair-related inscription from Vijayanagara Empire era instead. The northern array also mostly lack any ceiling art work except near the stairs in the middle, while the eastern array show the greatest signs of damage and restoration with most small shrines missing but for signs of their foundation.

The main temple is built on a jagati, which symbolizes worldly platform. It is about 3 feet high, star-shaped and has stone steps at its east end for the visitor to climb up to it. Near the stairs, on each side are two dvarapala (guardian) shrines but these are damaged.

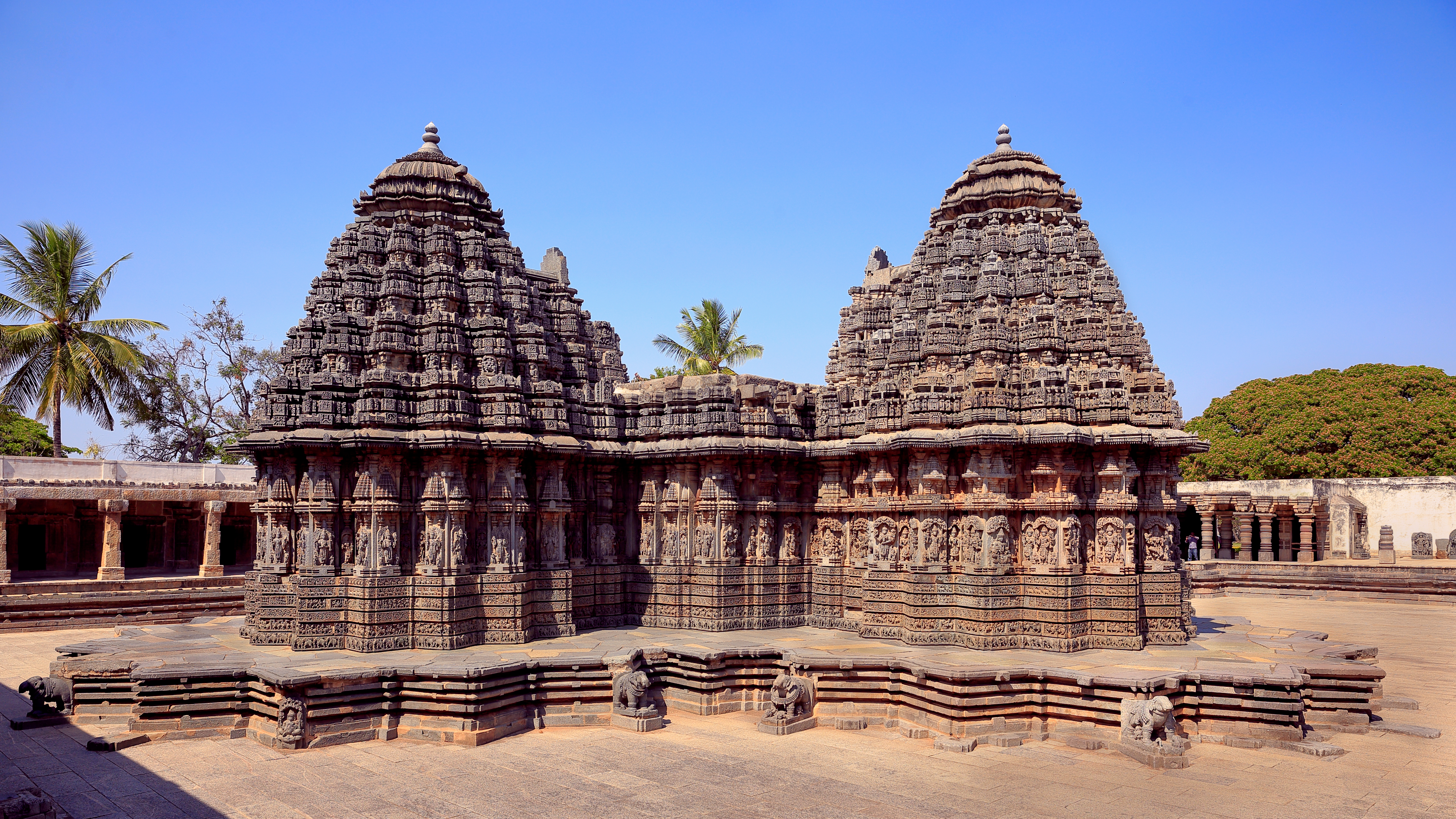
The platform around the temple serves as the circumambulation passage.

The raised jagati platform circles around the main temple with a broad walking space. It is the pradakshina patha (circumambulation path), and is supposed to be walked in a clockwise manner in order to pictorially read the Ramayana, Mahabharata and Bhagavata Purana legends in the correct sequence. The eastern side of the platform is rectangular, while the space below the vimana (temple tower) mirrors the pointed star tower shape, with nine points on each side and two linking edges (a total of 29). A stone elephant originally stood at each star point end of the platform, but only 11 of the 15 original have survived in a damaged condition. On the sides of the star side and where two stars of the jagati platform meet were 14 mid size images likely of Nagas and 58 images of Yakshas but all of this are now missing. The temple premises stores 7 of the broken pieces found in the early 20th century.

The platform appears from distance to be five stacks from the careful moulding. From the jagati level, there are four stone steps that leads the devotee into the temple's sabha mandapa inside. The hall appears to be rectangular, yet consists of two fused squares and a rectangle. A small square is at the entrance, the largest square in the middle, and a rectangle facing the three sanctum (garbha griya), all supported by intricately carved pillars. The main hall opens to each sanctum through a small square shaped puja mandapa. The three sanctums house Keshava (image lost), Janardhana and Venugopala. Above each of these sanctums rise the 16 pointed star shaped North Indian style tower (shikara).

=== Outer walls: lower levels ===
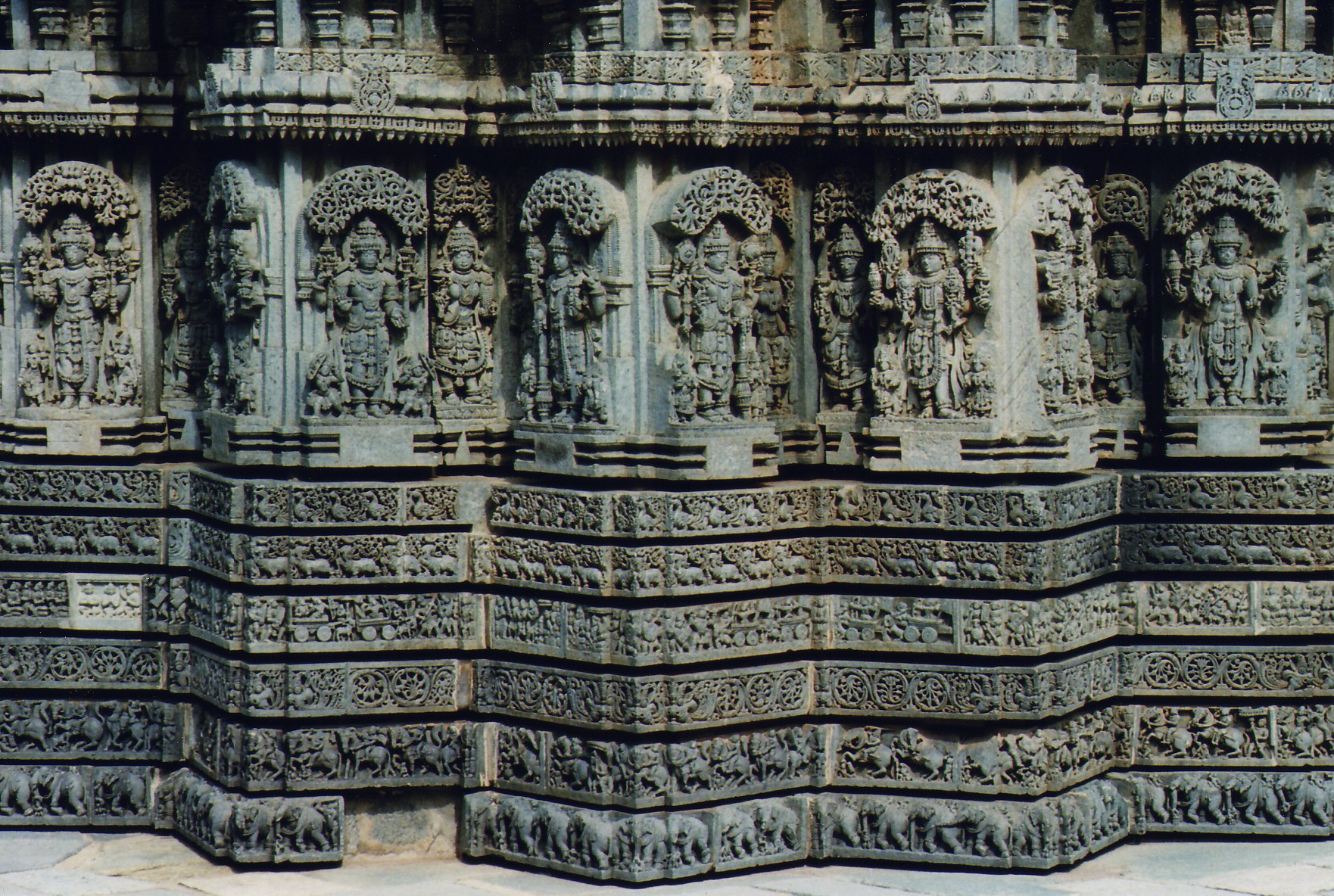
Wall panel relief and molding frieze around the main Kesava Temple

The outer wall of the main temple consists of parallel horizontal bands of artwork carved above the circumambulatory platform. It has three major section, the basement band, the wall band and the top band. The lowest band in the basement section is about 6 inches tall and shows a row of elephants mostly marching to the left in the clockwise direction the devotee is expected to walk. The elephants are not exact copy of each other, rather show different natural expressions and playfulness of elephants. Some show elephants in war, throwing enemies; while others show them teasing the riders in front. The band above the elephants is of horses with armed riders, depicting a military march. In some spots, camels substitute for horses suggesting that the Hoysala had adopted camels into their army. Some spots also show battle scene with horses. In various places, the artists added humor by placing dwarfs and monkeys supporting the front raised leg of the horses.

The band above the horsemen friezes is a scroll of nature. It shows flowers, fruits, occasionally some peacocks and wildlife. The band above it is the mythology frieze. It is about 7 inches tall, around 2.5 feet above the platform, and it depicts the legends and spiritual stories found in the Ramayana (up to face 5), the Puranas particularly the Bhagavata Purana (from face 6 to 11) and lastly the Mahabharata. There are numerous panels around the temple that tell the various Hindu fables and stories.

==== Ramayana ====
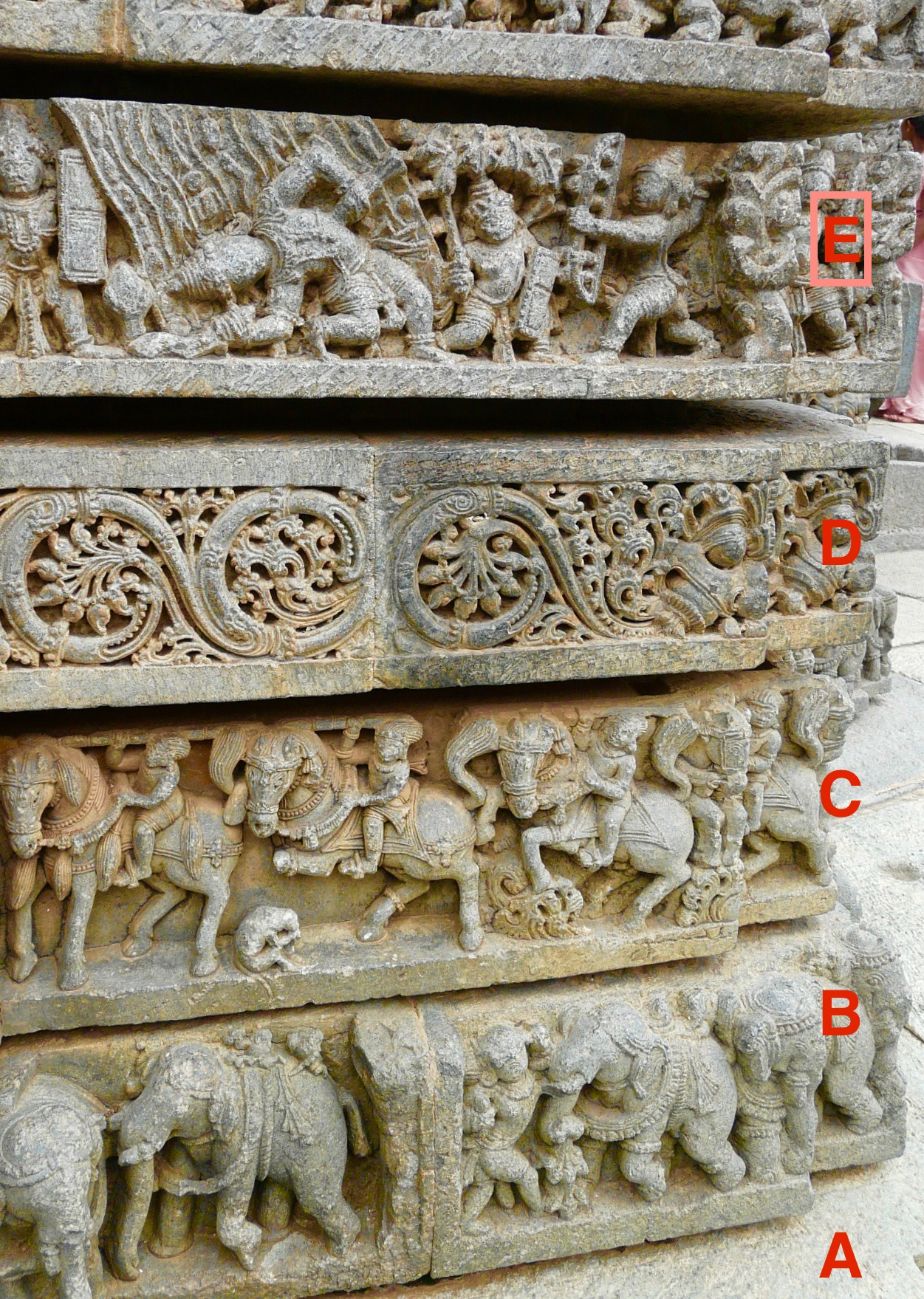
The various bands on the lower part of the outer wall at the main Kesava Temple. A: the platform; B: marching elephants; C: marching horsemen; D: nature scroll; E: friezes of Hindu texts.

Only the early parvas of the Ramayana are depicted. A few shown at the Kesava temple include: (Note: Many scenes from Hindu texts are found in the upper part of the outer walls as well. Some scenes are also found in the Navaranga hall inside the temple.)

- Dasharatha makes ritual offerings and prayers for children. Rama and his brothers are born.
- Babies rocked in cradles, another frieze shows Rama and his brothers crawling on all fours.
- School life, martial lessons.
- Young Rama slays Tataka to protect the Rishis.
- Vishvamitra, Rama and Lakshmana at Janaka's court. Another shows Sita marrying him.
- Married Rama and his brothers in Ayodhya.
- Rama, Lakshmana and Sita leave for their exile. They wander in forests and meet various sages.
- Viradha attacks Sita, Rama slays him.
- Surpanakhi episode.
- Golden deer legend.
- Ravana abducts Sita. Another frieze shows him slaying Jatayu.
- Hanuman and Sugriva meet and join Rama.

The rest of the Ramayana is not depicted, and the Bhagavata Purana starts thereafter.

==== Bhagavata Purana ====
The band around the western shrine depicts the Bhagavata Purana. Some scenes of the Bhagavata are repeated. A few of the legends from it shown at the Kesava temple include:

- Reclining Vishnu in the cosmic ocean story.
- Vasudeva's marriage legend.
- Baby Krishna being carried across the river by Vasudeva.
- Various friezes of baby Krishna feeding in Gokula, rocked in cradle, crawling on all fours.
- Krishna kills Putana and Sakatasura.
- Toddler Krishna steals butter.
- Krishan lifts Govardhana.
- Various friezes of Krishna playing with enchanted gopis.
- Krishna kills various demons and ultimately slays Kamsa.

==== Mahabharata ====
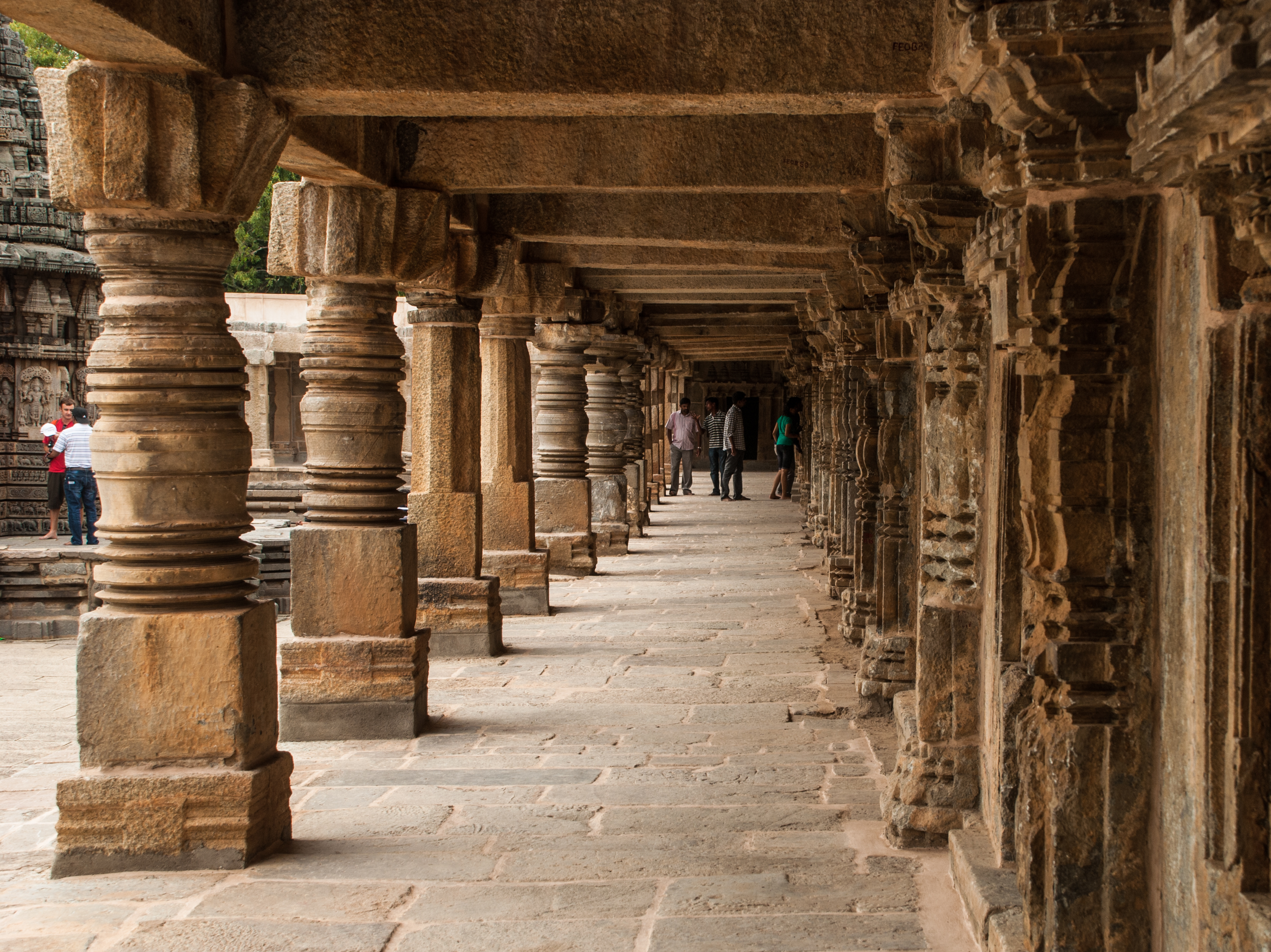
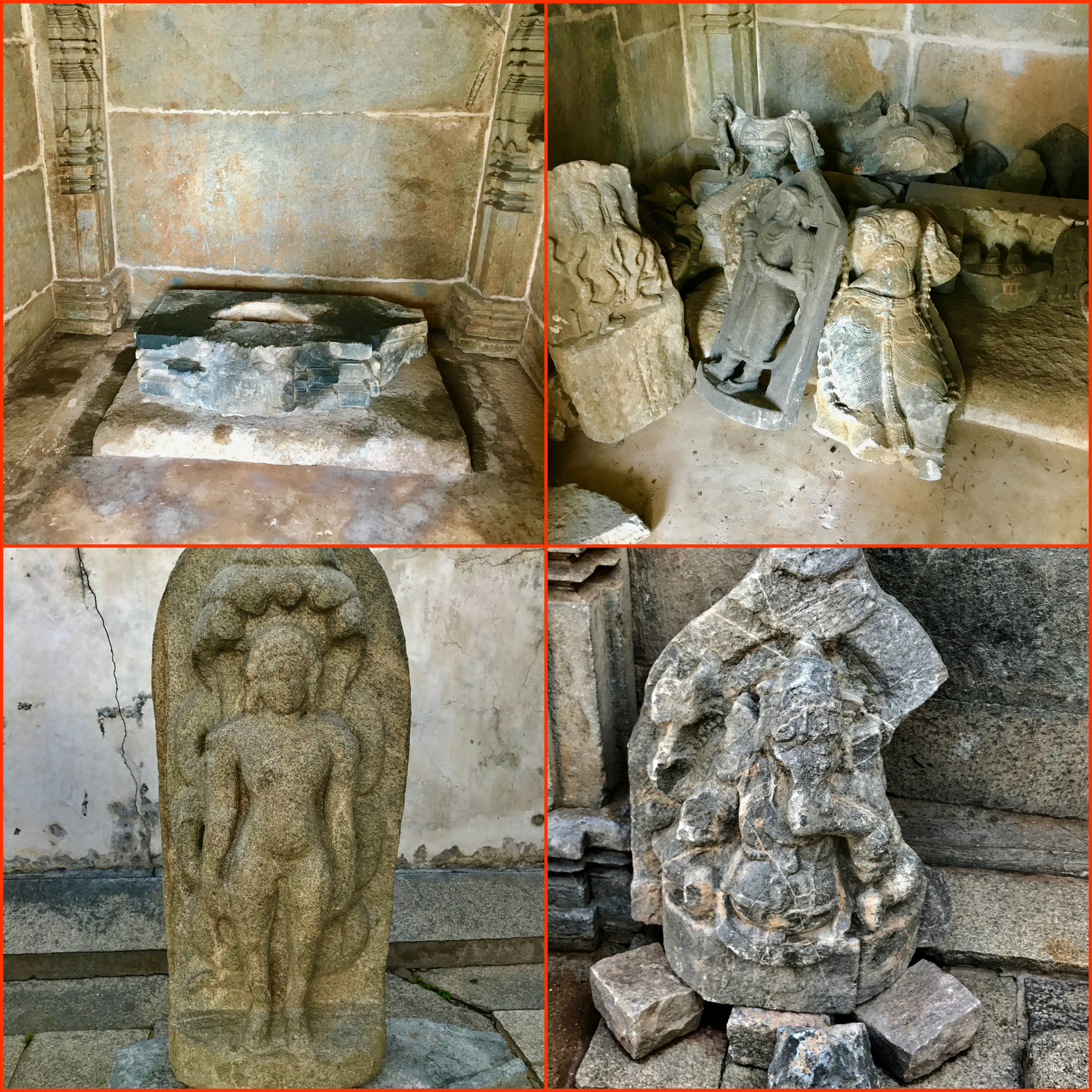
The corridor with small shrines and monastery (left); defaced and damaged Jain and Hindu statues in the corridor.

A few of the scenes shown on the outer wall of the temple include:

- Dhritarashtra's court.
- The rivalry between Pandava and Kauravas as they are growing up.
- Pandavas leaving for forest.
- Bhima marries Hidimbi, birth of Ghatotkacha.
- Pandavas meet Drupada and stay at a potter's house.
- Draupadi's marriage partner selection ceremony.
- Arjuna hits the fish target, Draupadi picks him as her husband.
- Pandavas return with Draupadi.
- Yudhisthira plays dice, loses.
- War scenes. Krishna advises the Pandavas.
- A scene where a hero does Yoga seated in an asana, while admirers garland him.
- Pandavas win. Their return to kingdom.

=== Outer walls: upper levels ===
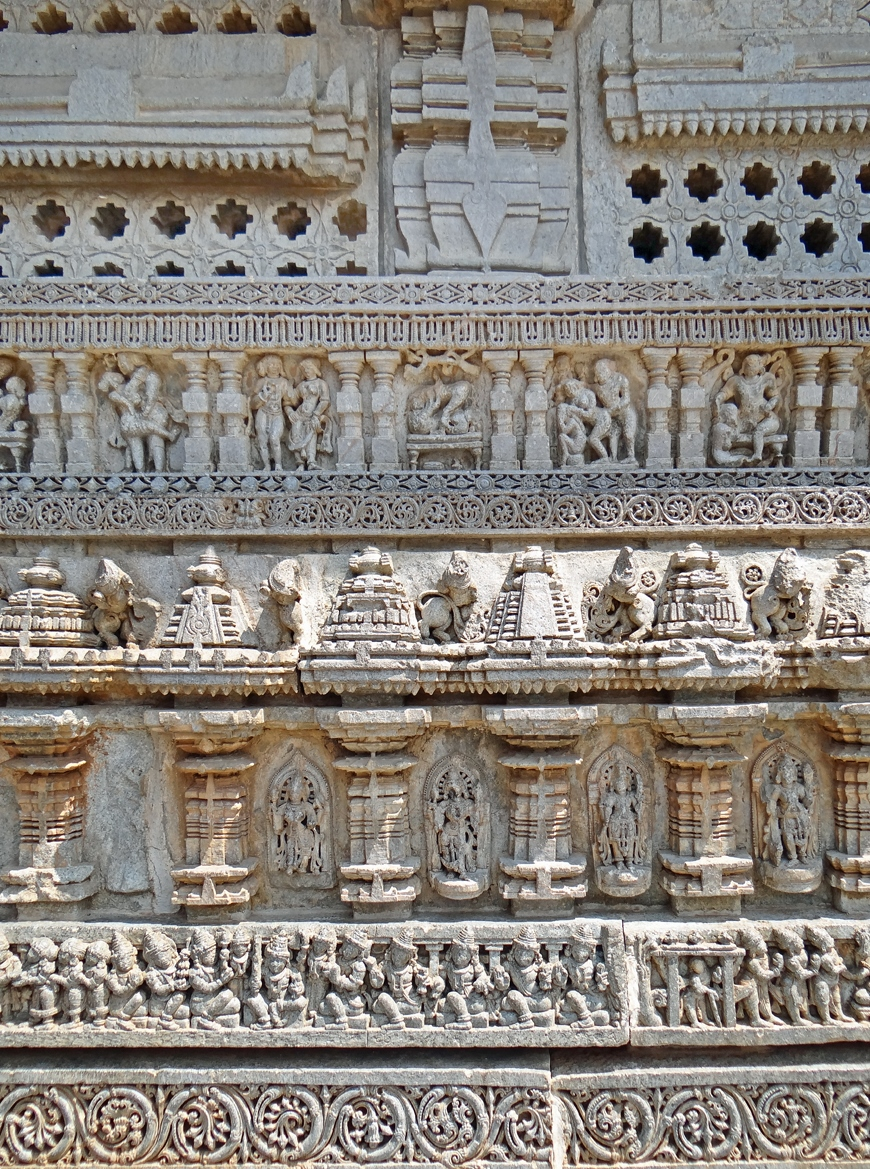
Outer walls of mantapa with miniature deity reliefs, and common life scenes. Above: couples, some in sexual scenes (kama, mithuna).

==== Mantapa walls ====
Above the lower level band with friezes depicting the Hindu fables and legends is a band of mythical makaras (a creature based on the fusion of various animals) and then a band of decorative peacocks. Above the peacock band of nearly 200 relief carvings are rows of secular life of the people and small size deity reliefs that wraps around only the sabha mantapa (community hall) part of the main temple. Most of these are defaced and damaged. Some are difficult to identify.

The deity-related reliefs are predominantly Vishnu shown in his various aspects and avatars in the Vaishnavism tradition, but they include Shiva of the Shaivism tradition, Devis of the Shaktism tradition and Surya of the Saura tradition of Hinduism. For example, of the panels when counted clockwise from entrance, #12 is of Saura, #23 is of Durga in her Mahishasuramardini form, #25 to #28 are of Shaiva tradition.

Reliefs on the outer wall upper side

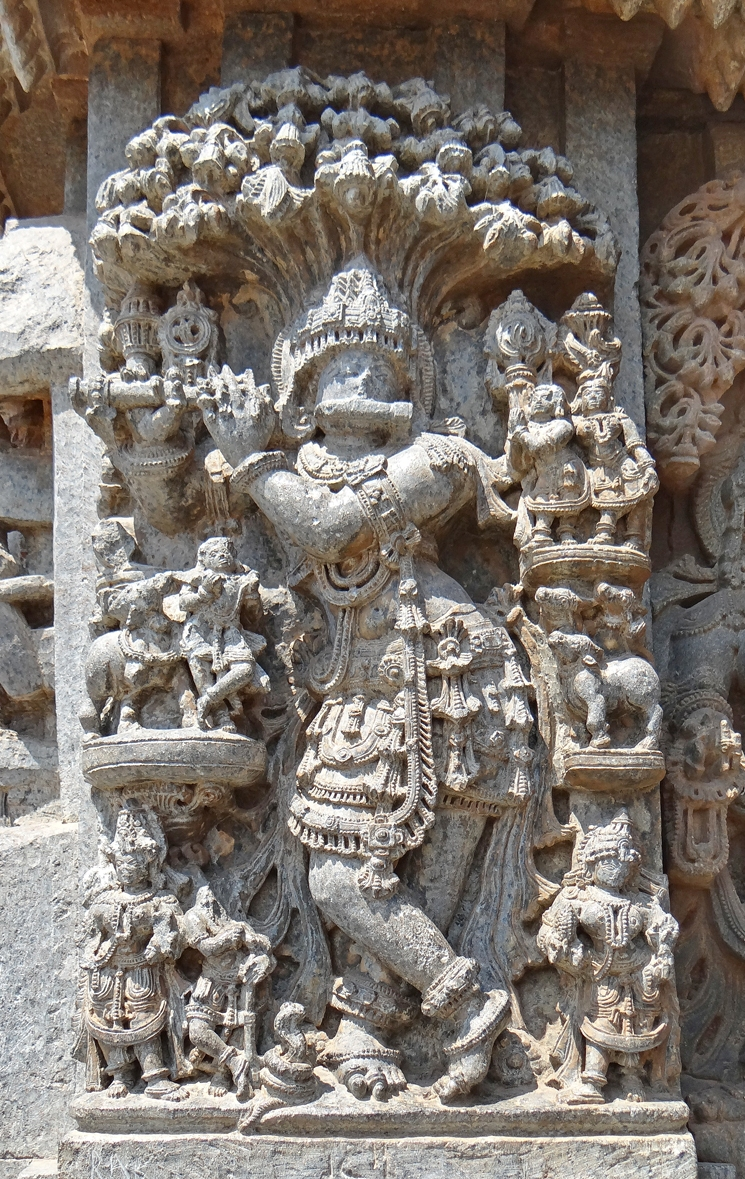
Krishna with flute, humans and cows listening

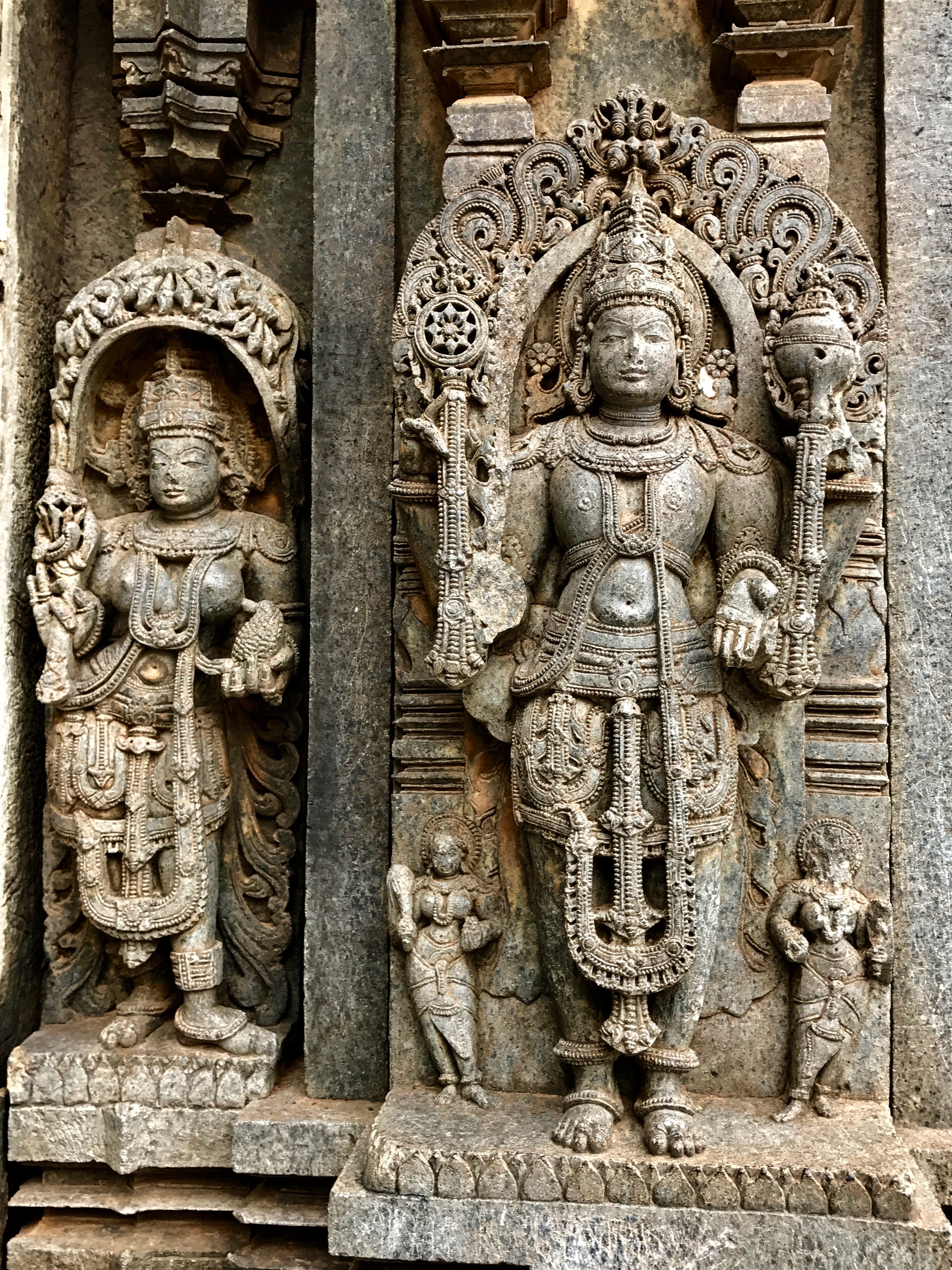
Standing Lakshmi and Vishnu

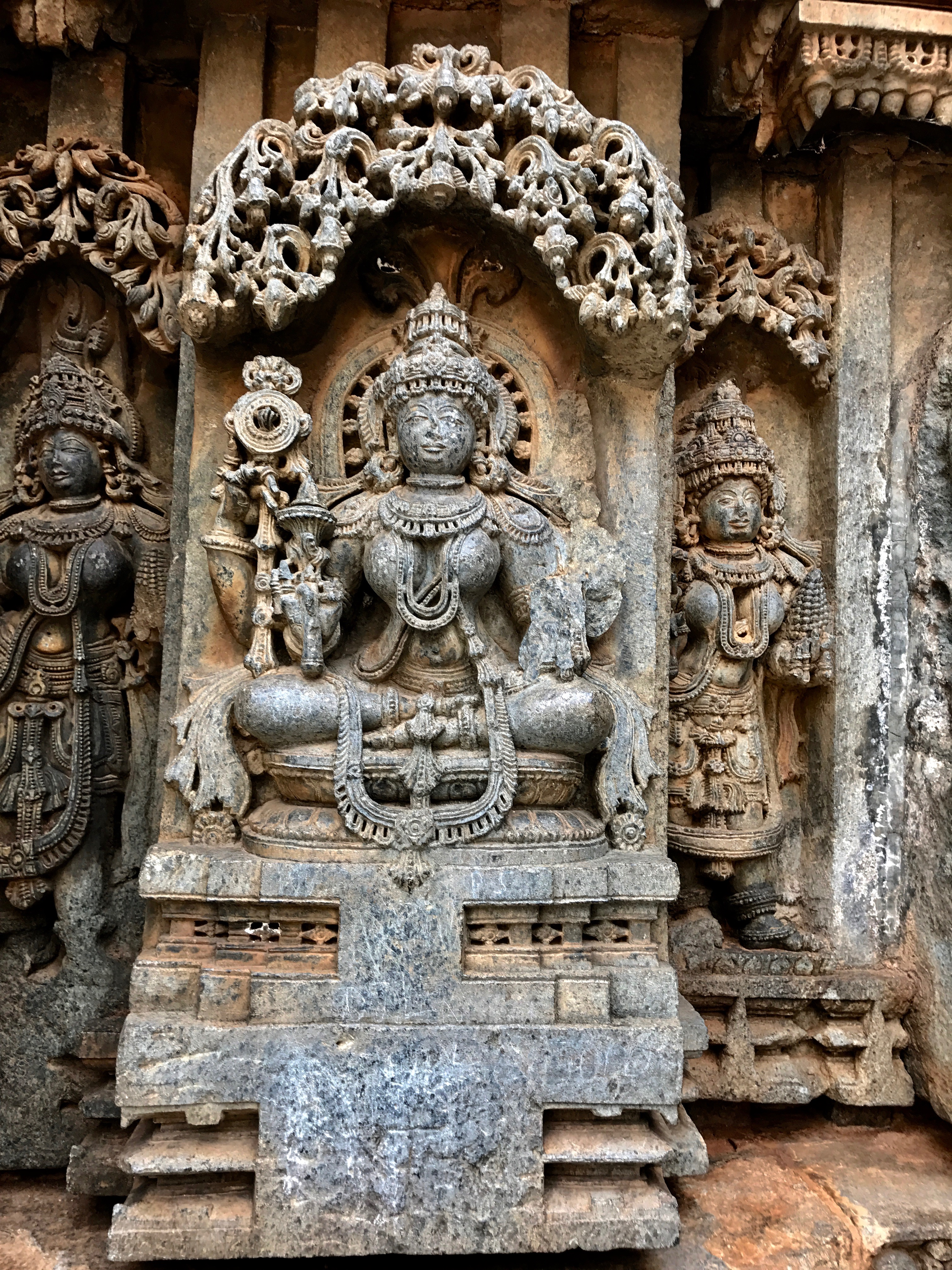
Mohini, female avatar of Vishnu

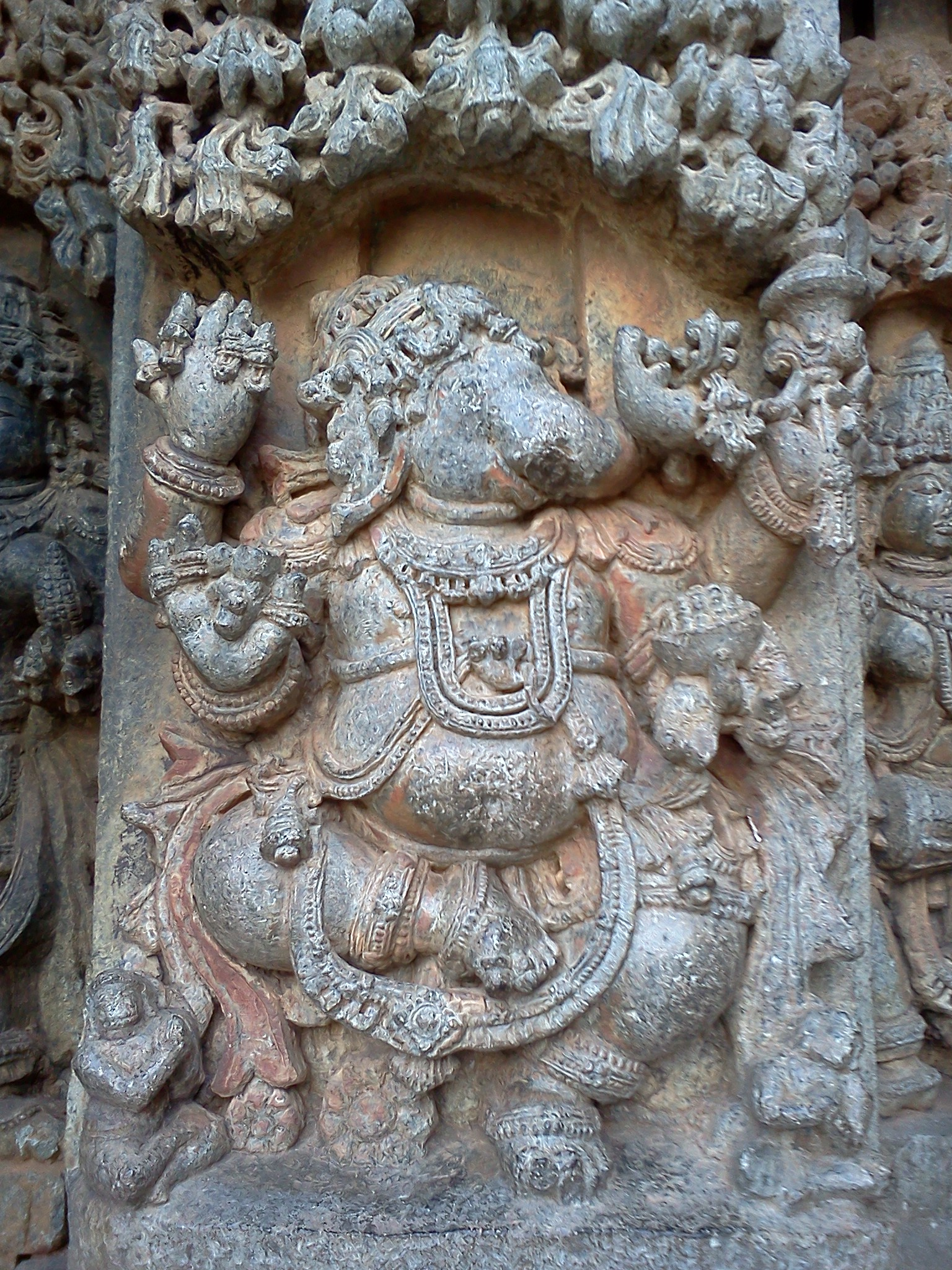
Dancing Ganesha with sweets

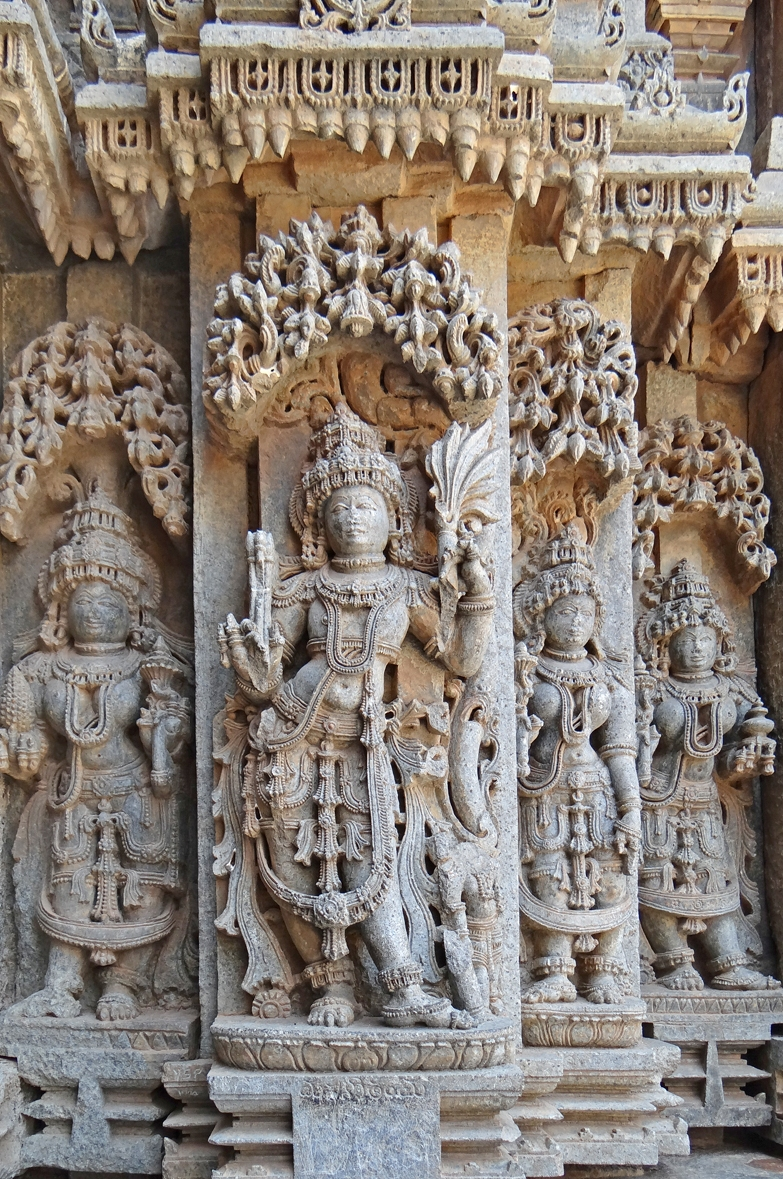
Kama with sugarcane stalk

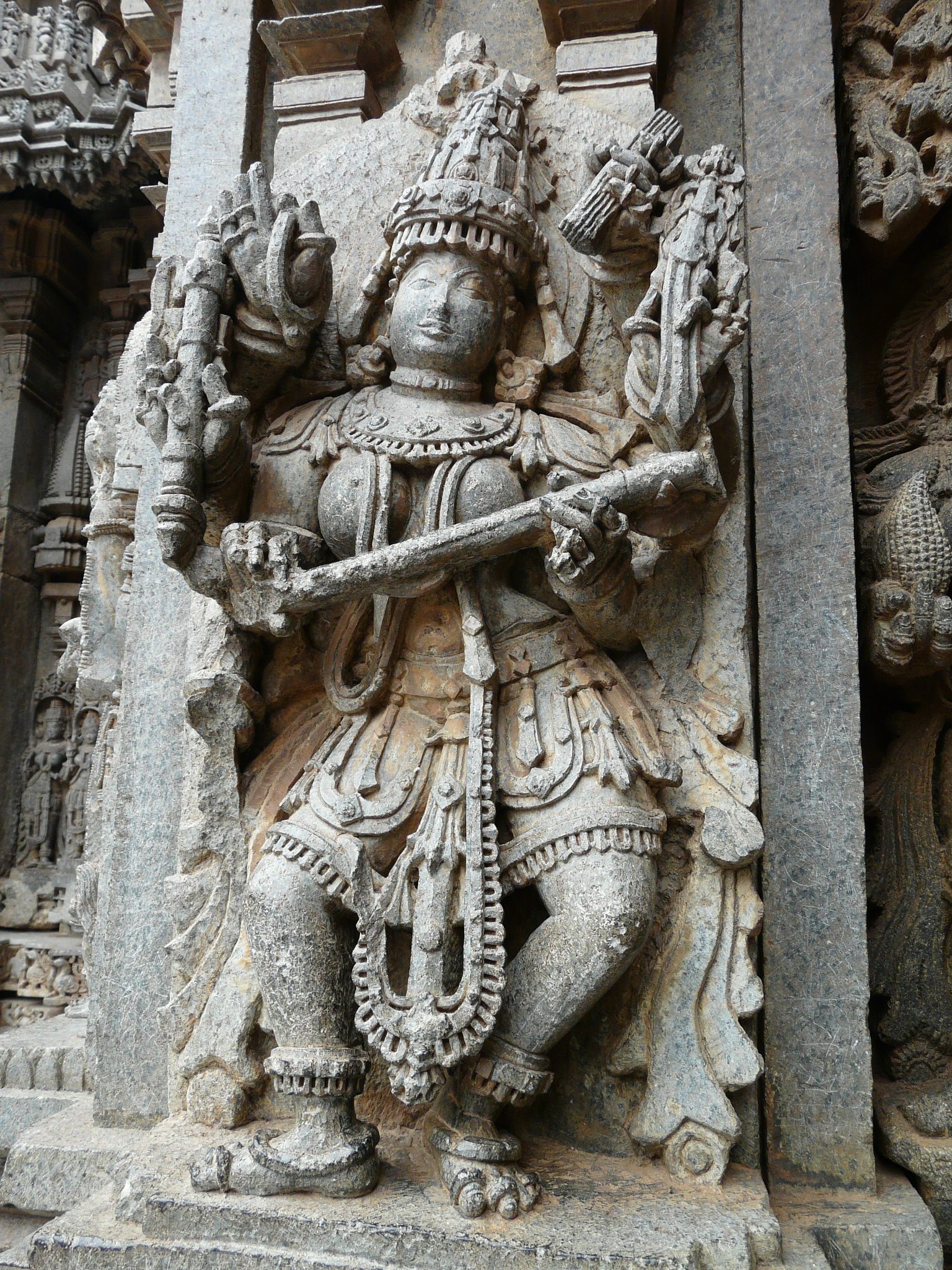
Saraswati with the Vedas and her alapini veena

The Kesava temple has hundreds of reliefs, mostly Vaishnava. They include Shaiva, Shakti and Saura themes.

The reliefs showing common life of the people include festive scenes, dancers in various mudras, musicians with 13th century musical instruments, couples in courtship and sexual scenes, mothers nurturing babies, hunters and other professionals with pets such as dogs, soldiers, yogi, rishi, individuals in namaste posture, couples praying and others. These reliefs also include numerous friezes showing the story of Prahlada, Hiranyakashipu and Vishnu avatar Narasimha.

==== Garbha griha tower walls ====
In the case of the three towers, above the peacock band of carvings is a row of larger size deity reliefs that wraps around the temple. There are about 90 reliefs showing mostly Vishnu with Lakshmi, as well as Shakti, Shiva, Brahma, Saraswati, Indra, Indrani, Kama, Rati, and others. Most of these are also partially defaced such as broken noses, chopped limbs, chopped out stone jewelry and show other forms of damage. Some are therefore difficult to identify.

Some illustrative carvings of large images include:

- Tandava Ganesha
- Dancing Saraswati
- Keshava, Venugopala, Janardana, Krishna legends
- Vishnu to be same as Indra, Varuna, Yama, Vasudeva, Yoganarayana, Matsya, Kurma, Varaha, Narasimha, Vamana, Parashurama, Rama, Krishna and Buddha
- Dancing Lakshmi in various forms
- Brahma with and without beard
- Harihara (half Shiva, half Vishnu) in various forms
- Surya
- Durga as Mahishasuramardini
- Dancing Vishnu

The first sixty and the last sixty reliefs have a superior finish and details, while the middle sixty five (#61 to #134) panels are less detailed. Some of the panels are signed below by the artist.

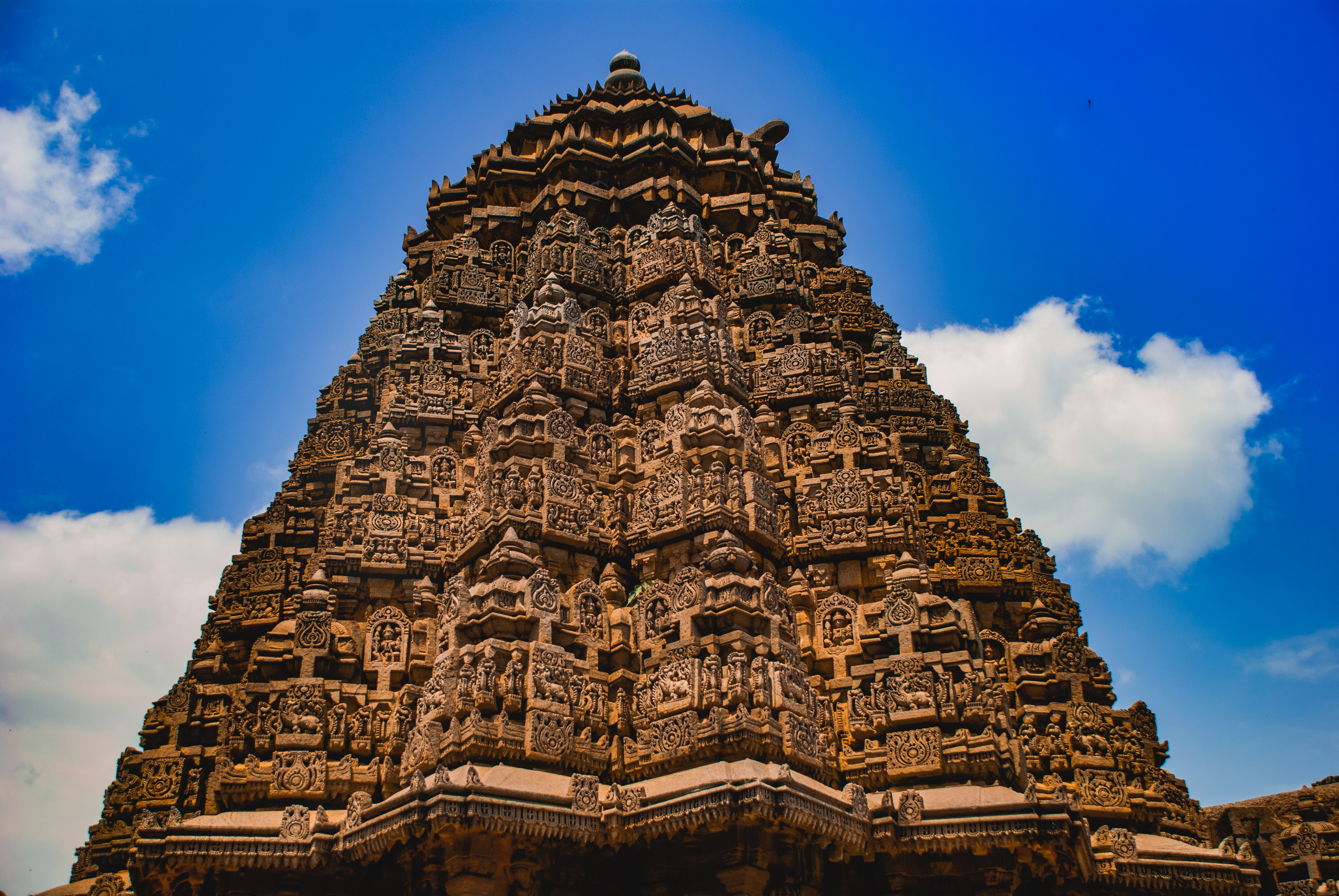
The ornate tower with interim kalasa.

==== Toranas and higher levels ====
The large wall images on the three identical tower superstructures each has an arch (torana) to frame the image. The western side has simple flat or geometric arches, while the northern and southern sides have intricately carved nature themes, such as hanging fruits, flowers and flower laden creepers. Some include buds and stages of natural development in flowering plants, while a few include wildlife such as a lion in the center. The tower itself combines intricate artwork, in a plan that alternates rotating squares with star-shaped 16 petalled lotuses. As the tower rises, interim shikaras are capped with kalashas (pots common in Hindu ceremonies).

All three towers are of same height. Their plan uses lotus with an oblong projection, four sets of ornamental turrets, rhythmically reducing in height and are capped by a stone kalasa. The carvings on the tower include dancers, gandharvas, yakshas, kirtimukhas, lion faces and mythical animals such as makaras. The top of each tower is shaped as an inverted blooming lotus flower. The original tower tops each had a large stone kalasa, but these were damaged along with the sukanasa, and the temple was without them. A recent restoration replaced the missing large kalasa with a small cement kalasa.

=== Mantapa, Navaranga ===
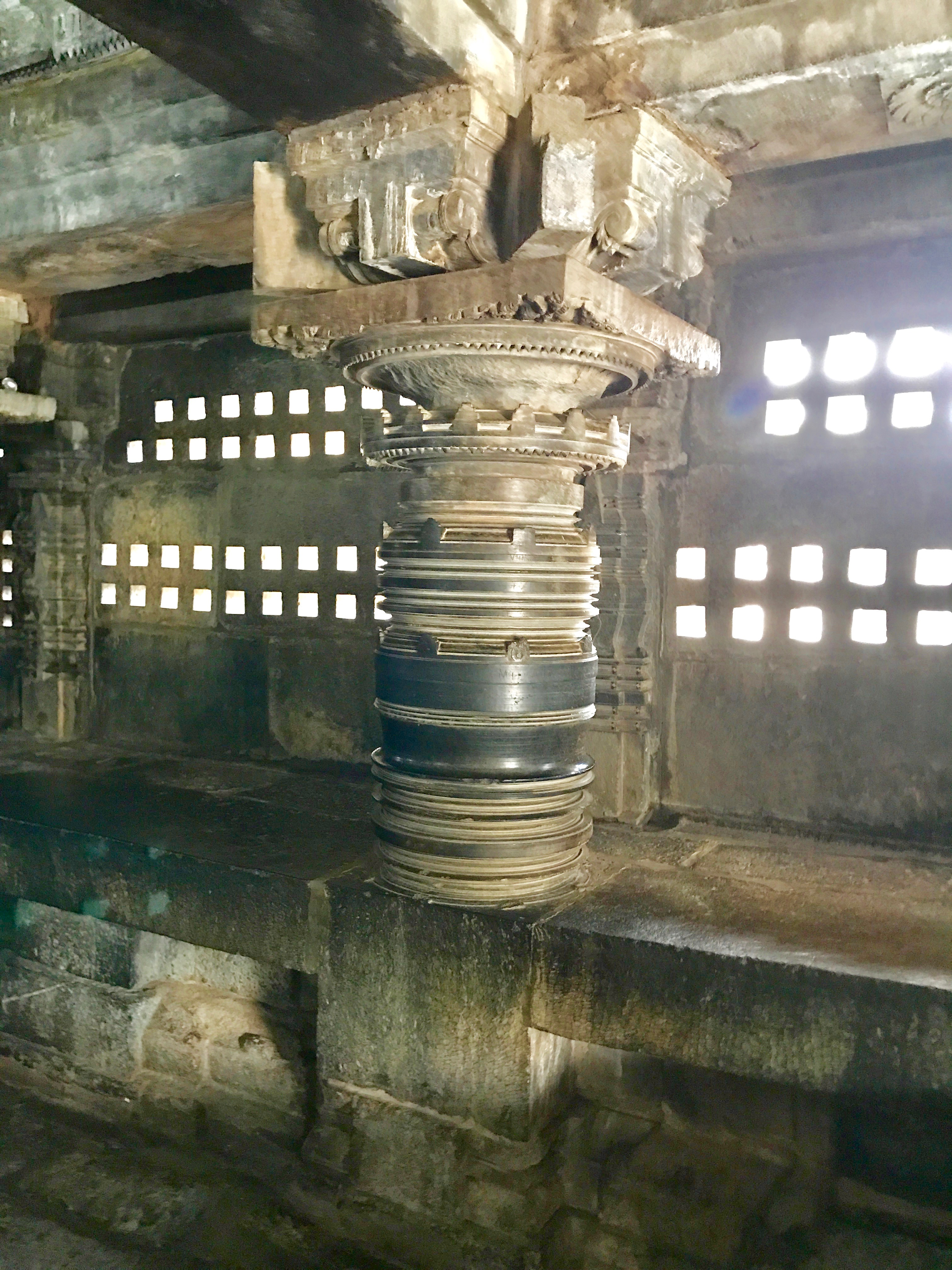
The architects provided the interior hall with a place to sit and perforated screens for light.

The main temple is entered from its east doorway. It lacked a door, but the ASI which manages the temple has added a wooden door to the temple. Inside the door is the Navaranga with the usual nine squares suggested by ancient Hindu texts on temple design. The square format is stretched by providing three ankanas and jagali platforms for the visiting devotees to sit. The architects brought in light by integrating a perforated screens on the wall. According to Krishna, the layout of three doorways inside and two niches whose images are now missing suggests that the interior of this temple was designed per Panchayatana puja architecture found in Smarta Hindu tradition.

=== Pillars and ceilings ===
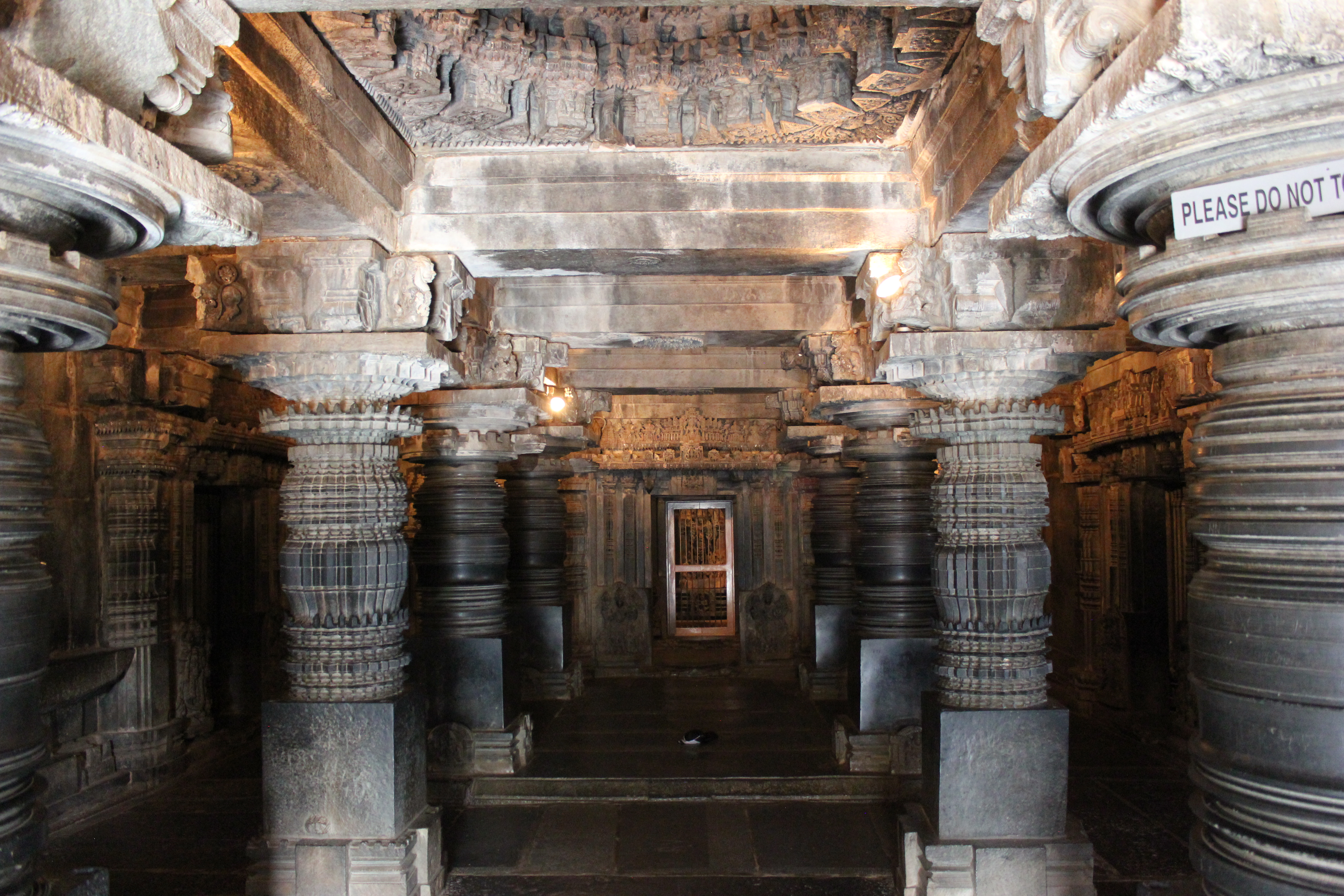
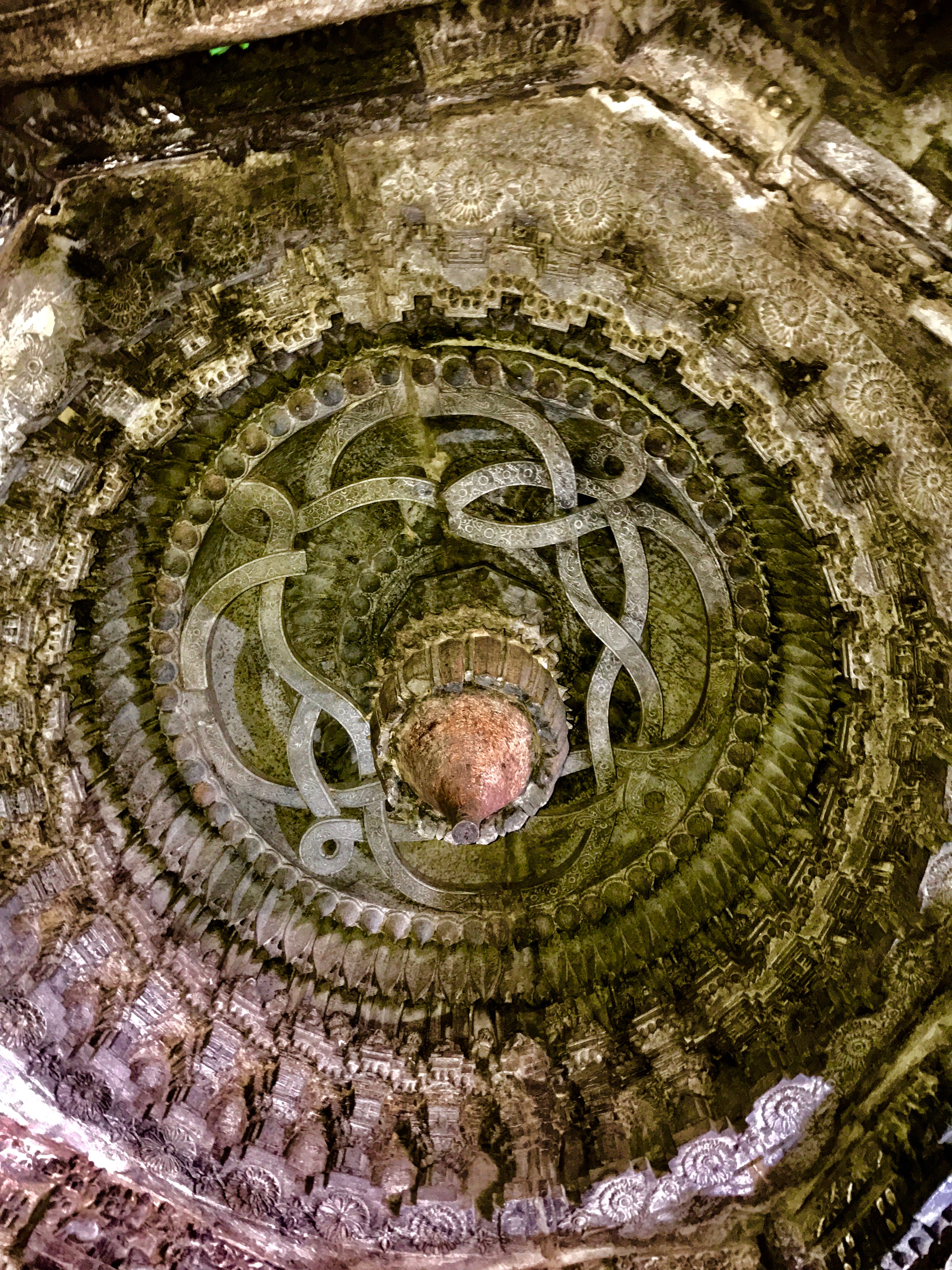
Lathe turned pillars, and intricately carved endless knot ceiling of the mandapa.

The mandapa (hall) is supported by lathe turned pillars. The pillars, except two of them, are of the same size. All of them, except four in center, have five mouldings from common life themes stacked in sequence: disc, bell, pot, wheel and umbrella. The four set of central square pillars of the Navaranga have yakshas and brackets, which have been damaged or have disappeared. The two pillars to the east of the central square are shaped as a 32 pointed-star.

The Navaranga roof consists of 16 squares, nine in the sabha mandapa and the remaining seven in the extension near the eastern entrance. These are all carved, each different, each with nature motifs and Hindu theology symbolism embedded. Among them is a palm leaves theme, different stages of lotus opening, endless knot symbolizing karma and samsara, one with 'dancers, musicians, soldiers with standing Vishnu and Shiva in various forms', rafters in Sri Chakra tantric layout and others.

Between pillars, the ceiling is domical and intricately decorated. These decorations could include multi-petalled lotuses, banana bud motifs based on stepped ponds and snake like (ananta) knots (symbolising eternity). Inside the temple, each vimana has a vestibule that connects it to the main rectangular mantapa (hall).

=== Interior wall carvings ===
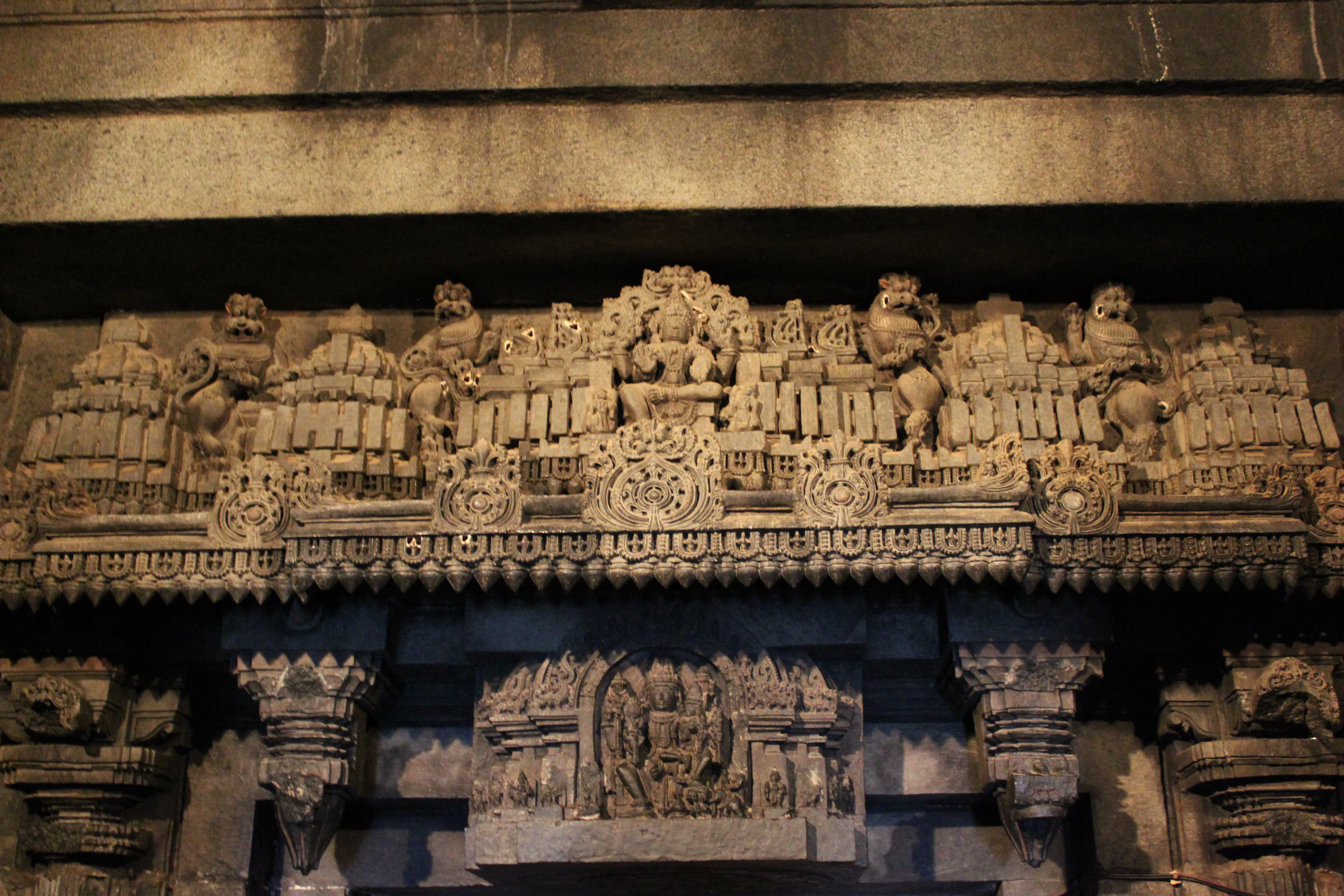
Close up of decorative lintel inside the temple

The Navaranga has friezes showing scenes from the Ramayana and the Mahabharata.

=== Sanctums ===
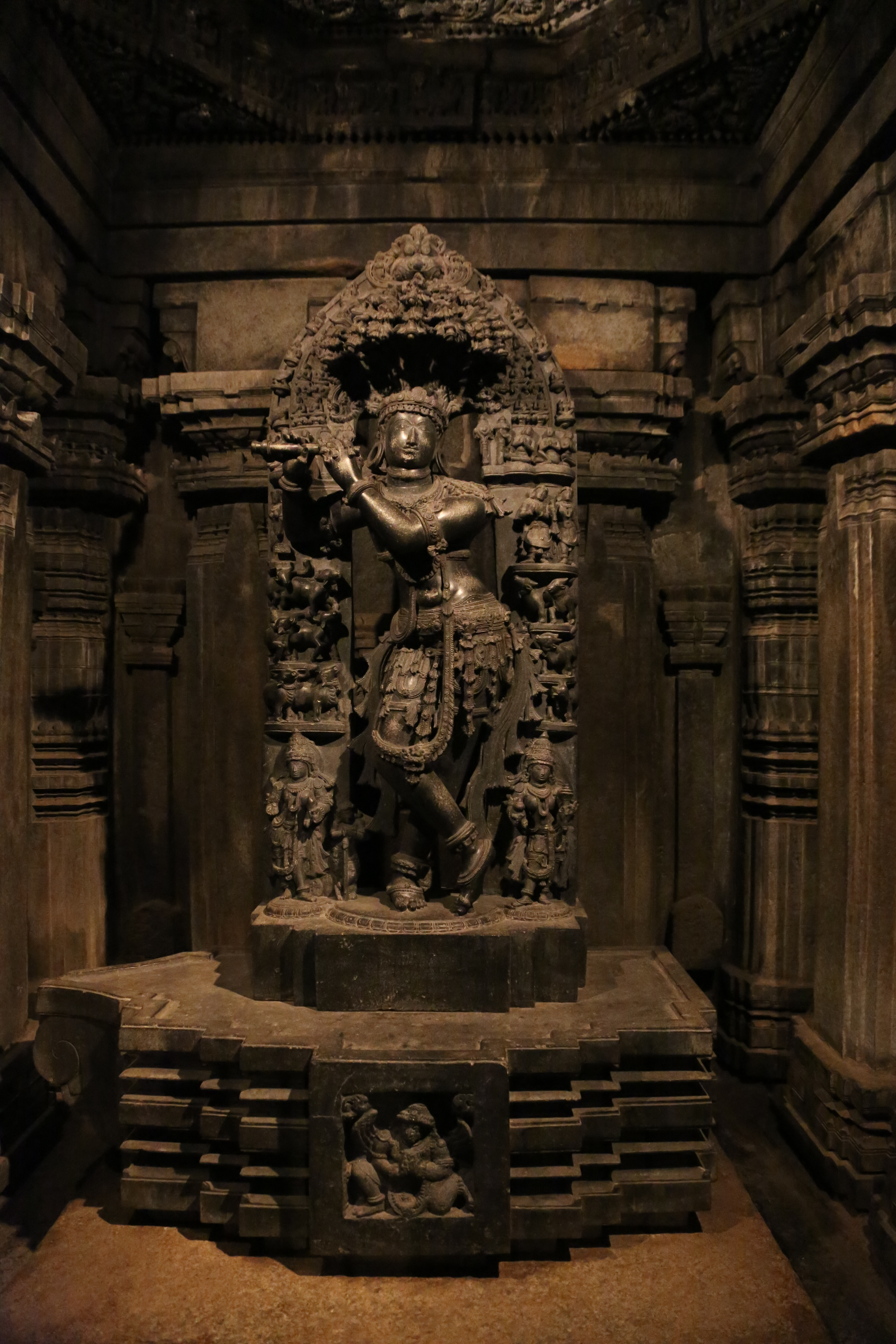
Krishna playing a flute in a sanctum of the Chennakesava temple, Somanathapura

Of the three shrines, one shrine is dedicated to Keshava, but the image is missing from the sanctum. The other two shrines house images of Janardhana and Krishna as Venugopala (all three images are forms of the Hindu god Vishnu).

==== South shrine ====
The south shrine entrance has two dvarapalas: Bhadra and Subhadra. The lintel above the entrance shows Venugopala. A 13th century Lakshminarayana carving is shown seated in the Sukhasana yoga pose, with him are chakra, conch, lotus and a gada (mace). Past the Sukhanasi, are Jaya and Vijaya, while the lintel shows a seated Vishnu and the canopy shows a dancing Vishnu. The south garbha griya is 8'x8' feet square, but includes niches into the wall for more space. The image of Krishna in the sanctum is 4.5 feet high. He wears ear rings, necklaces, armlets, bracelets, finger rings, toe rings, anklets, girdle and jewelled diadem. His legs are crossed, head slightly bent as he plays the bansuri (flute) he holds with both his hands. His fingers are in a tapping position, and all beings - from humans to cows, gods to goddesses inside the sanctum are depicted as absorbed in the divine music. Some figures are shown running to listen to the music, their clothes slipping off. Above the householders, gopis and cows are shown rishis (sages) who too are lost in the experience.

On the fringe of the image's torana (arch above) are carved the ten avatars of Vishnu in sequence: Matsya, Kurma, Varaha, Narasimha, Vamana, Parasurama, Rama, Balarama, Buddha and Kalki.

==== North shrine ====
The north shrine entrance too has two dvarapalas: Bhadra and Subhadra. The lintel above the entrance shows Janardana while the canopy again shows Lakshminarayana. Past the Sukhanasi, the lintel shows a seated Lakshmi and the canopy shows a Yoganarayana doing yoga. The garbha griya has a 6 feet high statue, wherein the Garuda pedestal is 1.5 feet, and the image of Janardhana is 4.5 feet high. He wears jewelry, and on the fringe of his image's torana are again carved the ten avatars of Vishnu.

==== West shrine ====
The west shrine entrance is similar to the southern sanctum in size and included features. The lintel above the entrance shows a standing Kesava while the canopy shows Gajalakshmi. Past the Sukhanasi, the lintel shows a Vaikuntha Narayana seated on Ananta Shesha and the canopy shows a Vishnu in Sukhasana yoga posture. The garbha griya has a Garuda pedestal that is 1.5 feet tall but the image is missing.

== Gallery ==
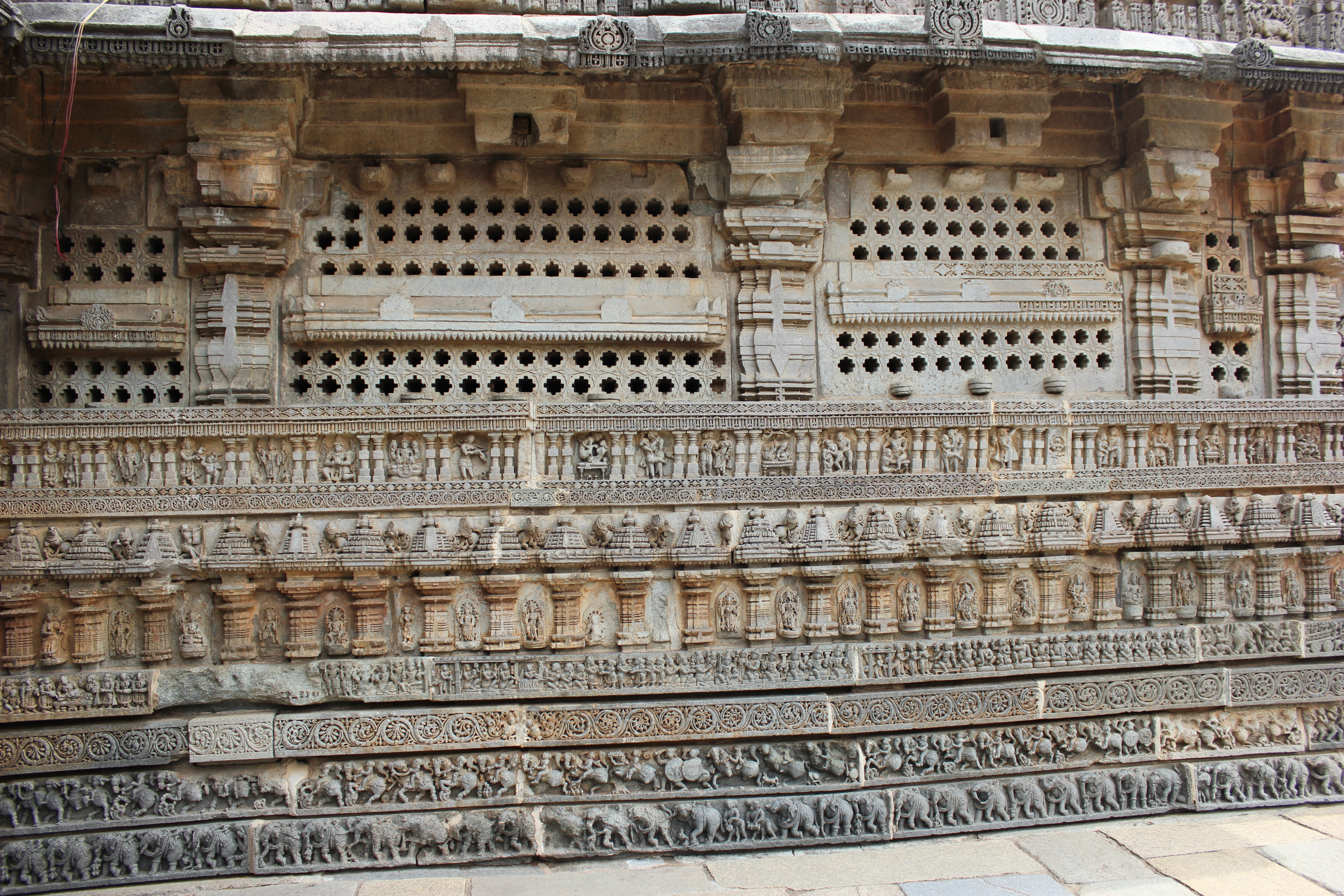
Wall relief, pierced windows and molding frieze

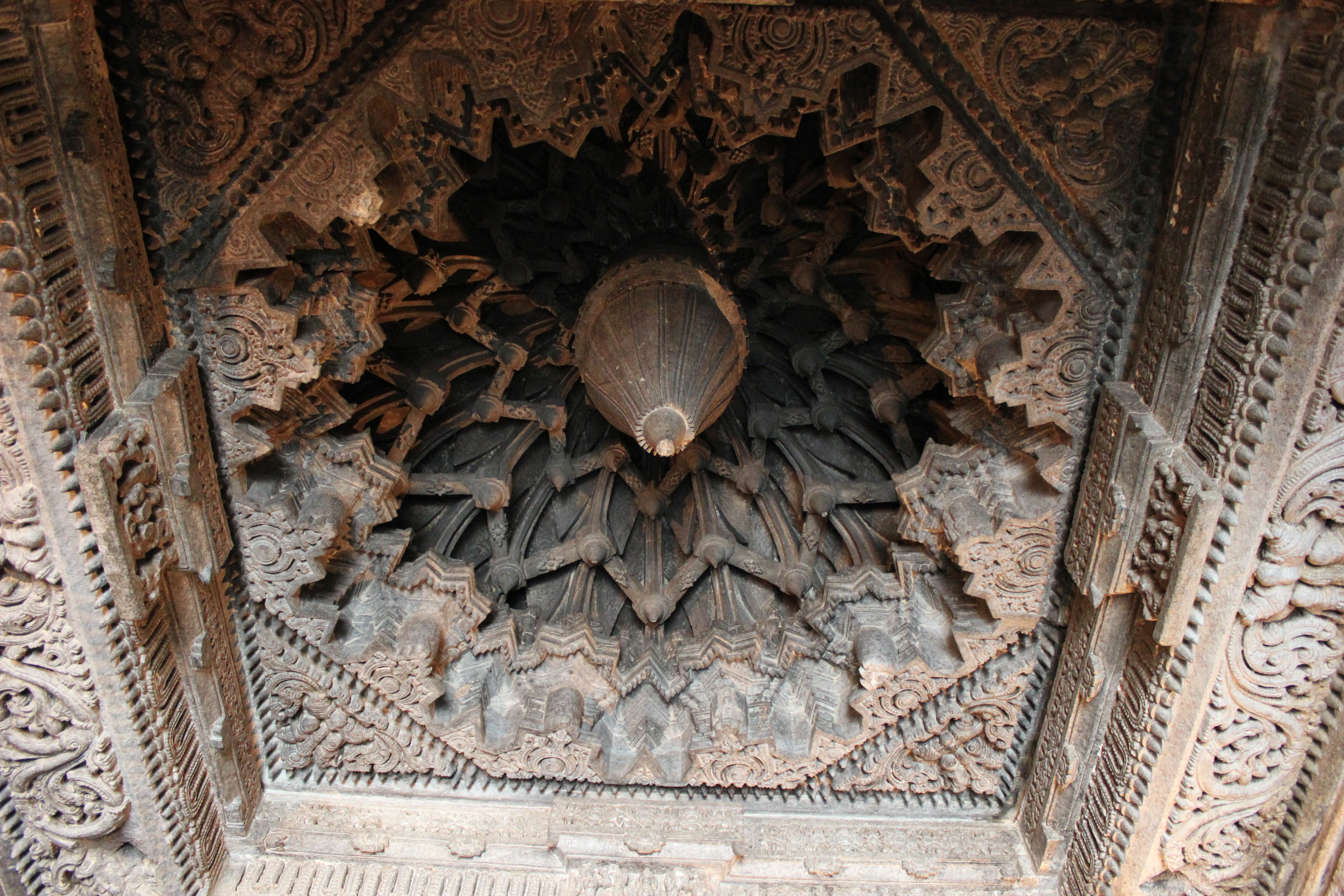
Ceiling

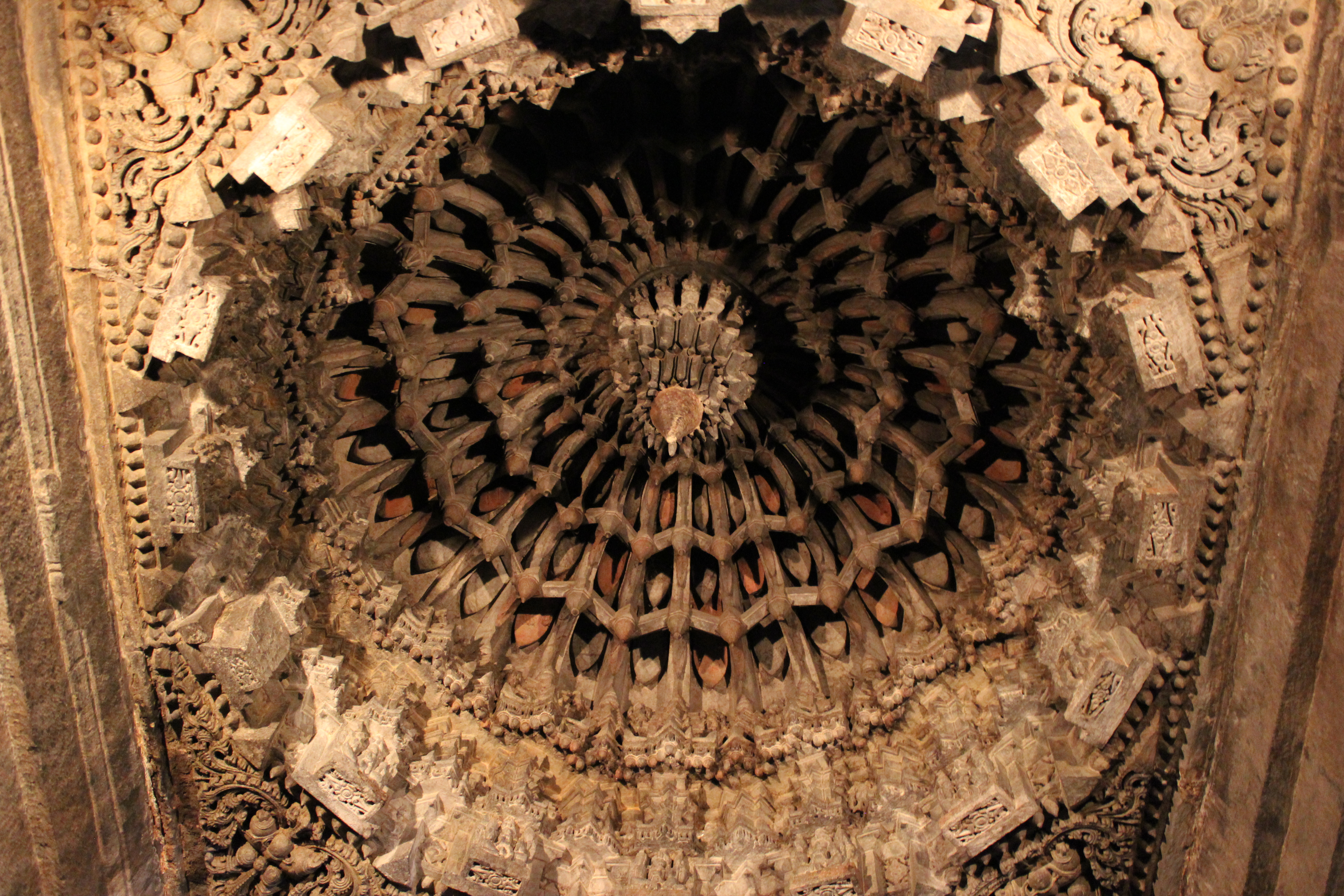
Ceiling leaves

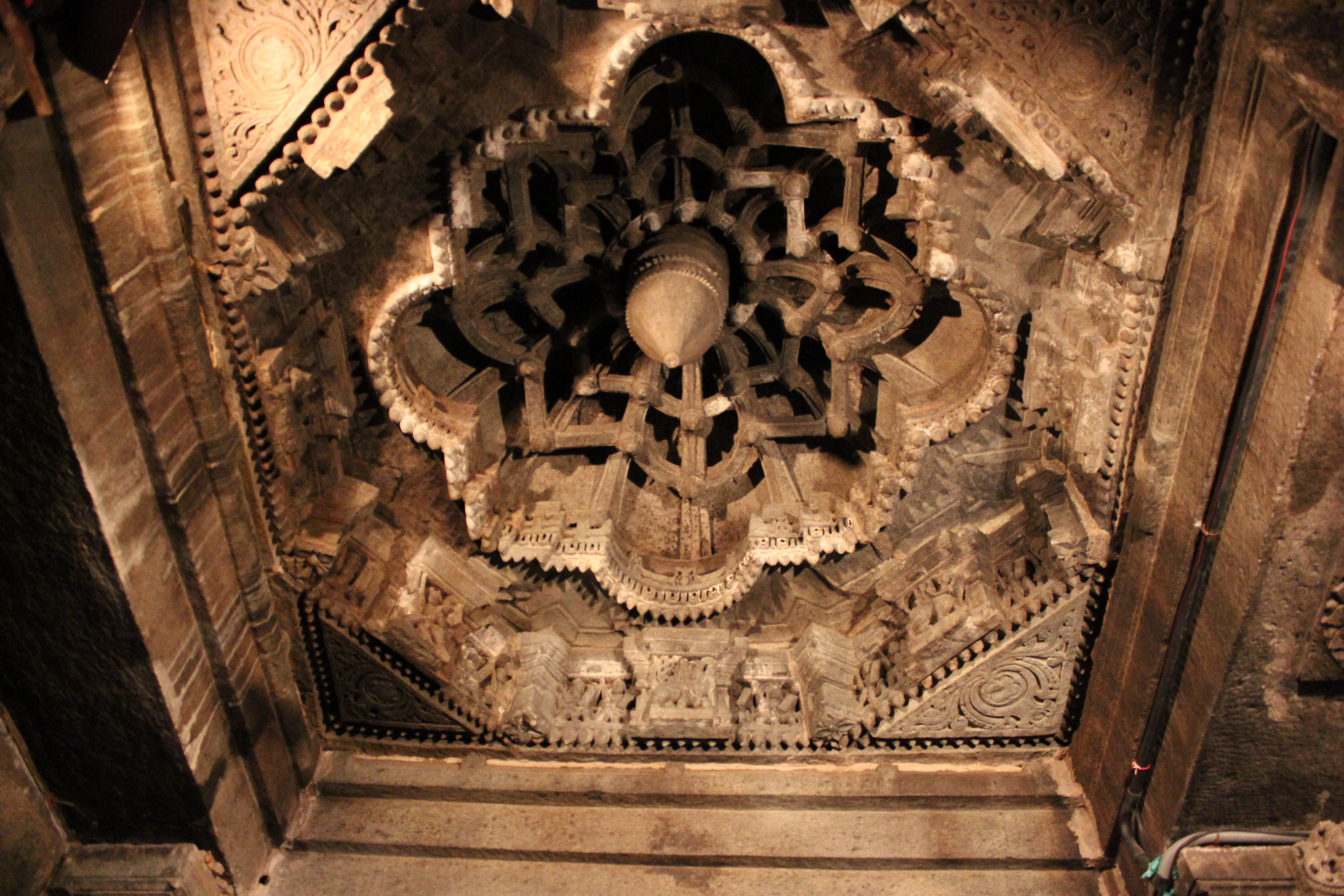
Ceiling opening flower

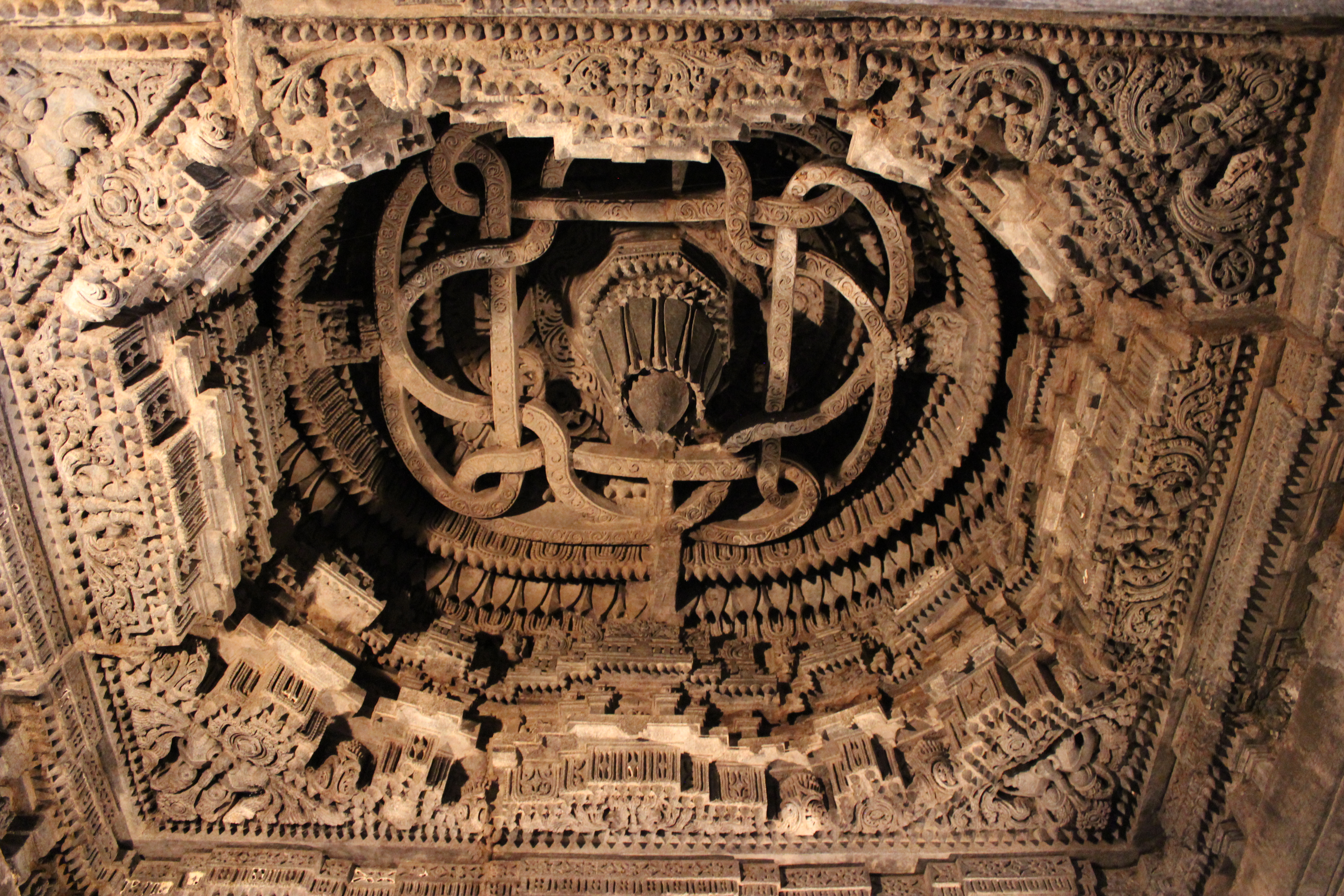
Ceiling, another endless knot

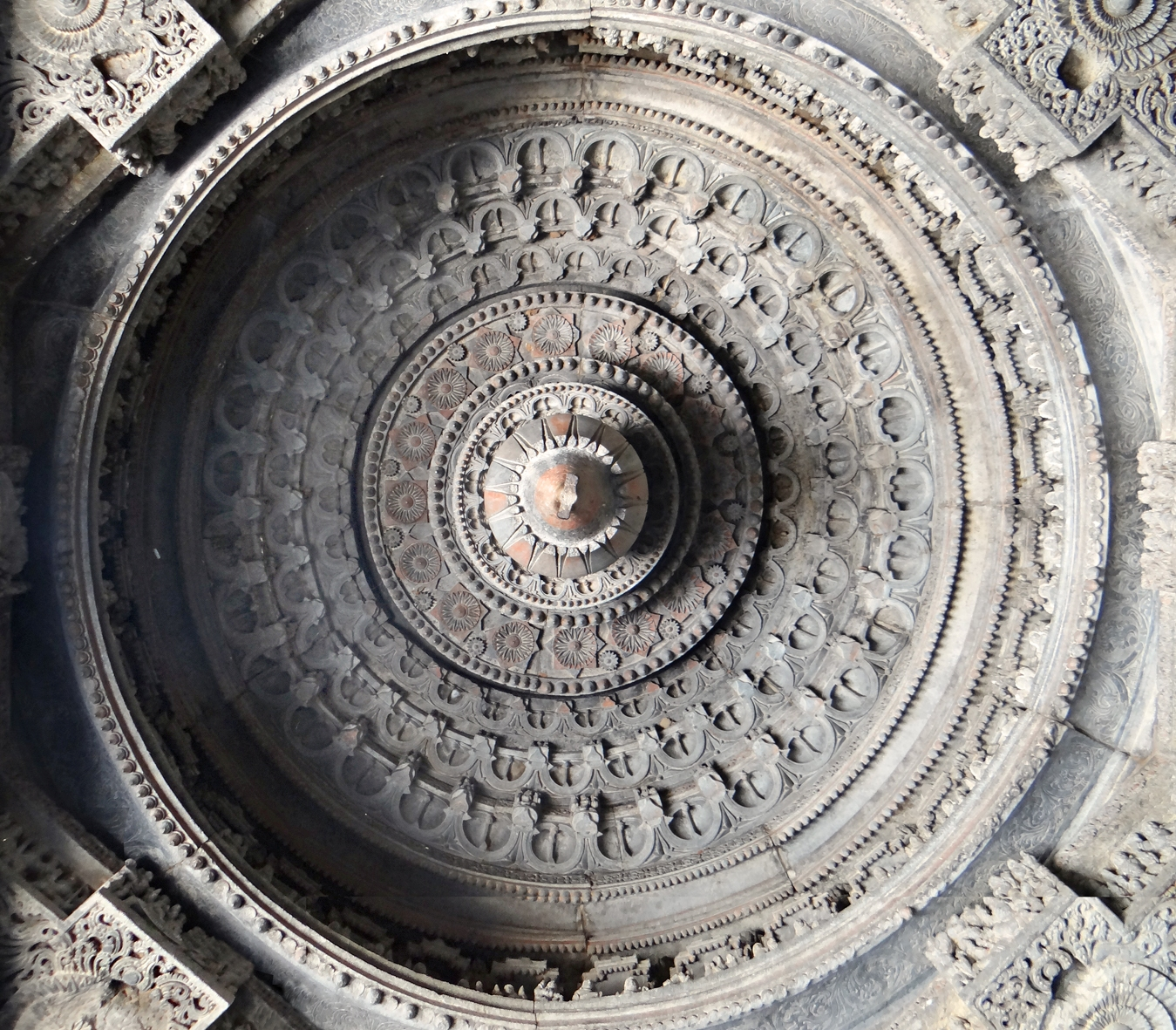
Ceiling, symbolism and social life inside the rim

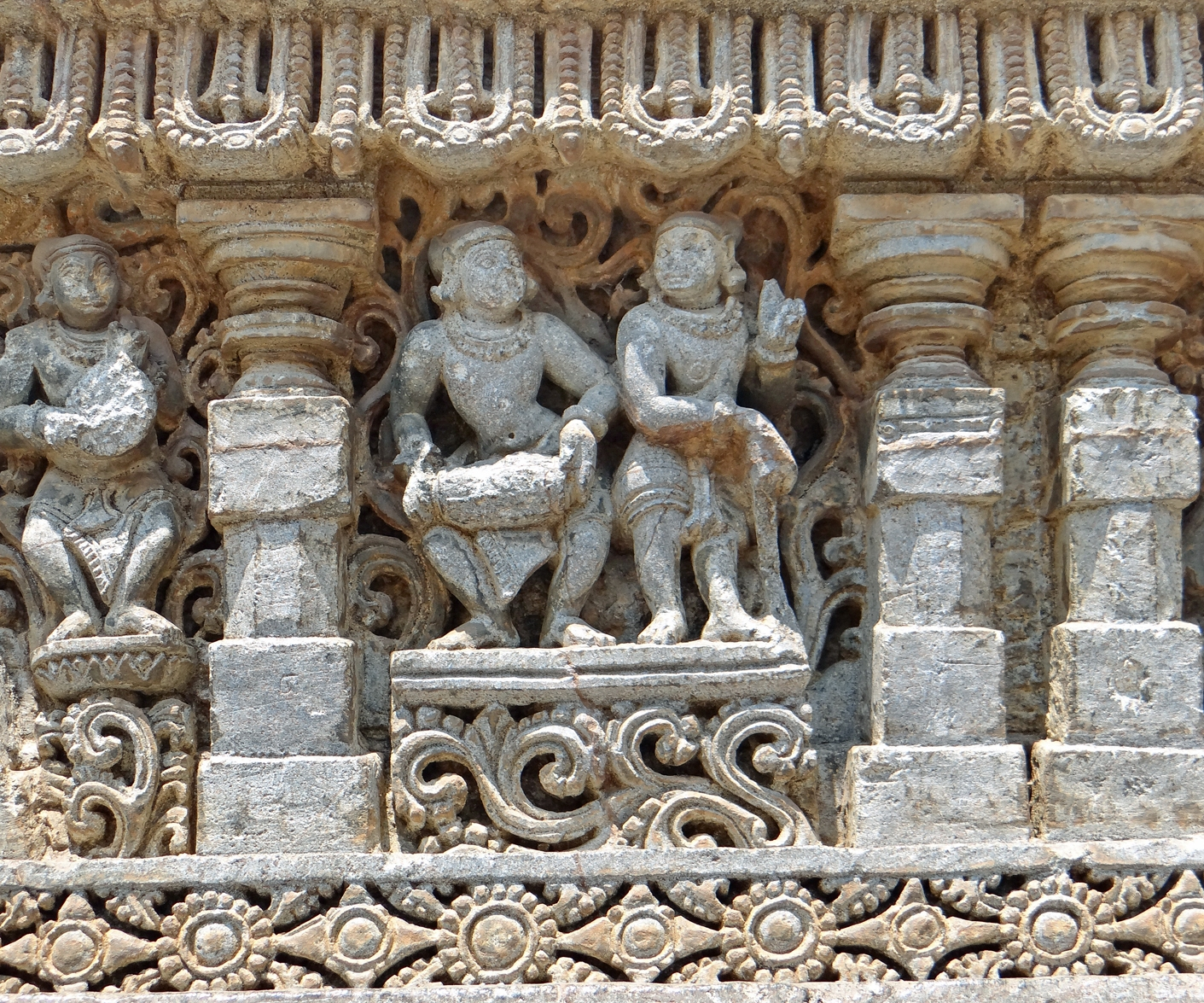
Music in the 13th century, Kesava temple

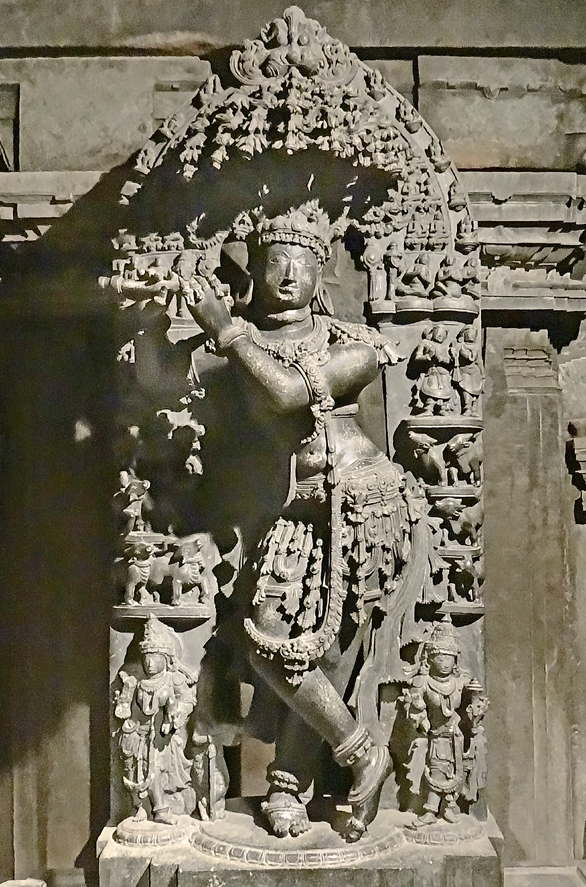
Krishna with flute, Kesava temple

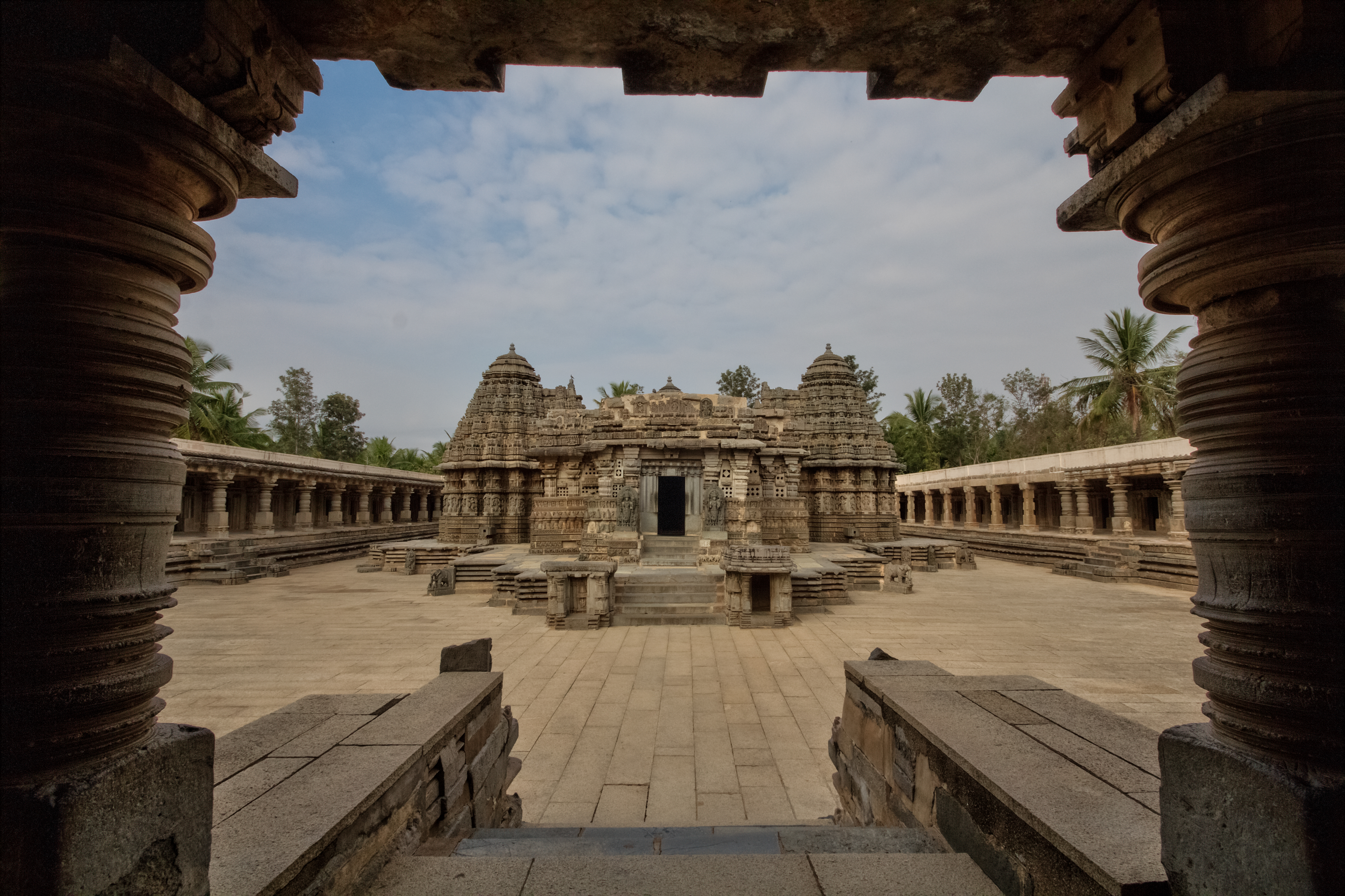

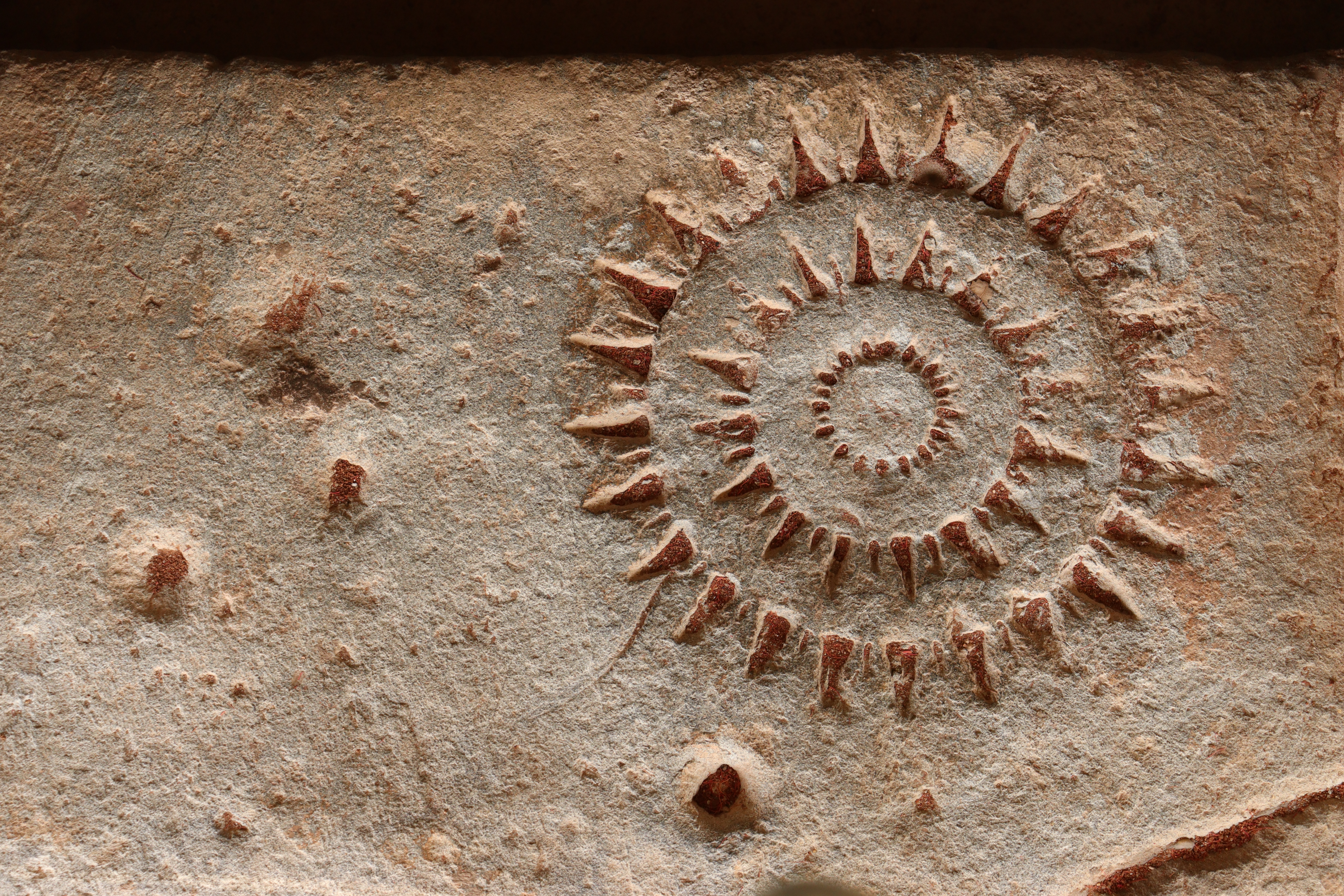
A unique motif

== See also ==
- Hoysala architecture
