= Basaralu =

Basaralu Basari alu
- village
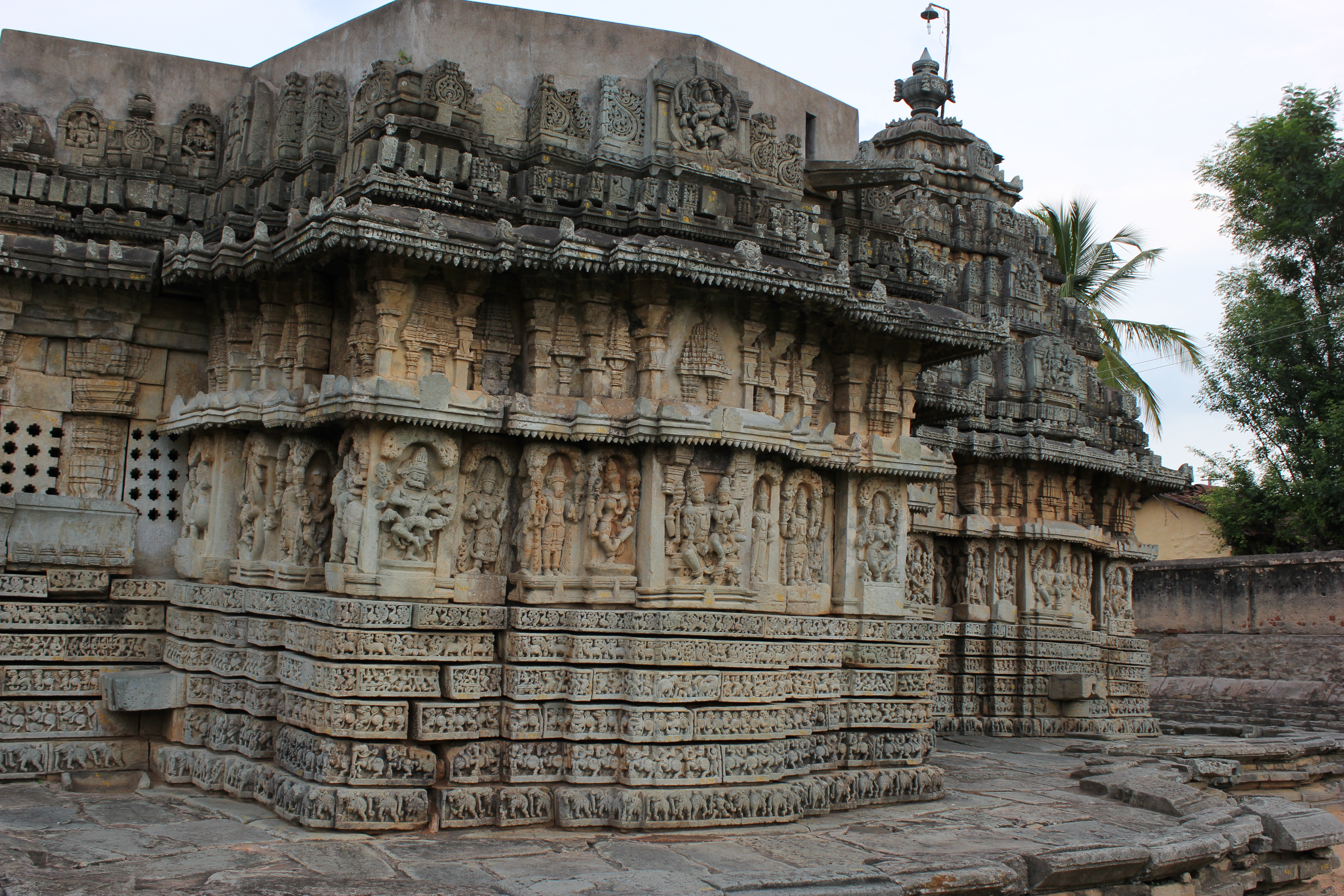
- The Mallikarjuna temple at Basaralu, built in 1234 during the reign of Hoysala King Vira Narasimha II

- Location in Karnataka, India
- Coordinates: 12.71°N 76.82°E
- Country: India
- State: Karnataka
- District: Mandya

Government
  - Type: Panchayat raj
  - Body: Gram panchayat

Languages
  - Official: Kannada
- Time zone: UTC+5:30 (IST)
- ISO 3166 code: IN-KA
- Vehicle registration: KA
- Website: karnataka.gov.in

Basaralu village is located in Mandya district, Karnataka, India. It is home to the Mallikarjuna temple, an ornate example of Hoysala architecture, and is dedicated to Mallikarjuna, another name for the Hindu god Shiva. This temple was built in 1234 by Harihara Nayaka, a commander under the Hoysala King Vira Narasimha II.

== Temple Complex ==
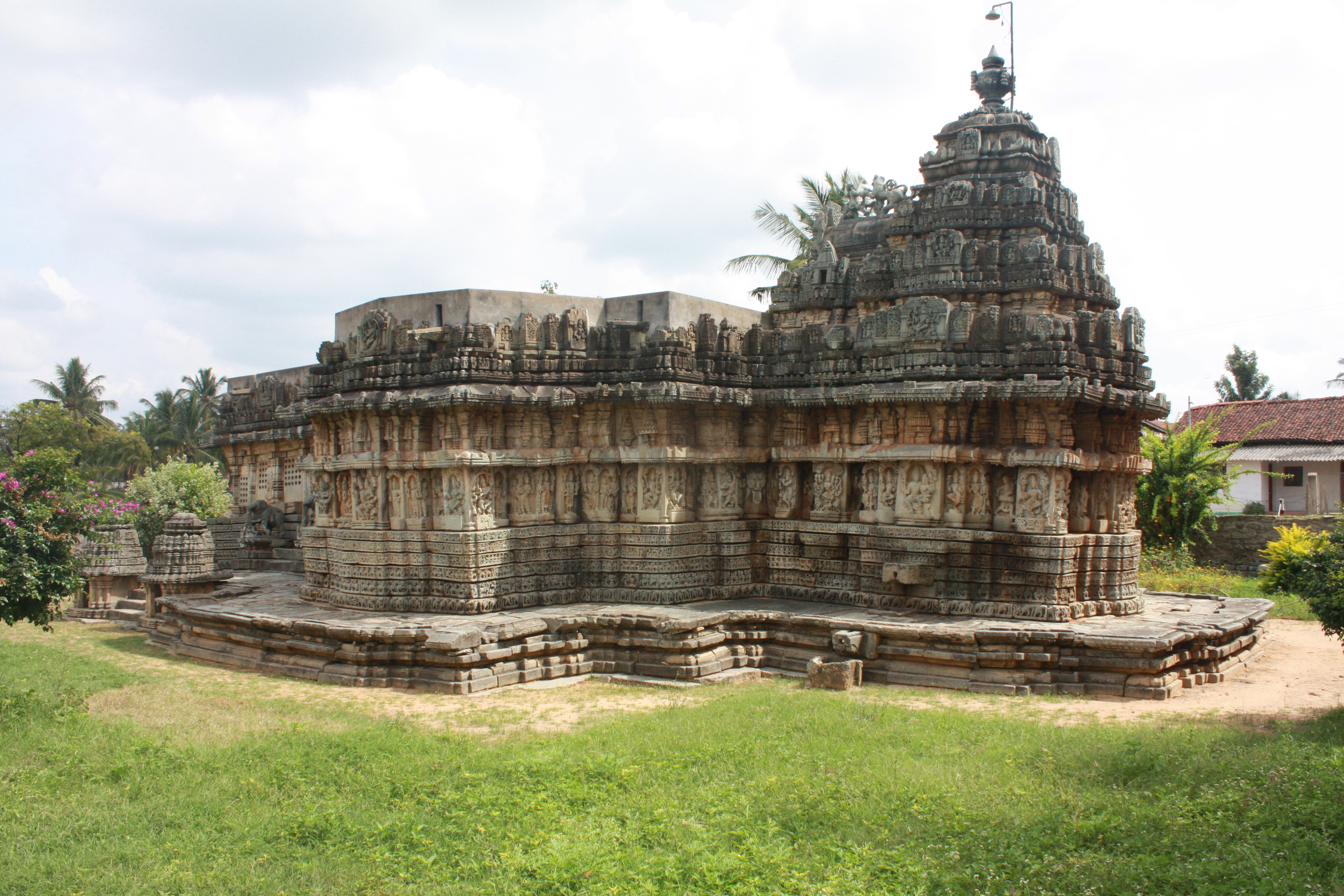
The Mallikarjuna temple at Basaralu, Mandys district, Karnataka state, India

The temple complex comprises two shrines dedicated to the deities Mallikarjuna and Chandikeshwara. The Mallikarjuna shrine houses a Balahari "linga" and beautiful lotus carving on the ceiling. There is a Bhairava sculpture in the sanctum ("garbhagriha") of Chandikeshwara temple in a corner of the temple complex. There is a twenty feet tall pillar opposite to the temple. The base of the temple has mouldings with relief in the ascending order of elephants, horses with riders, Hoysala emblem, puranic episodes, crocodiles and swans, a theme that is common in most Hoysala temples.

== Gallery ==
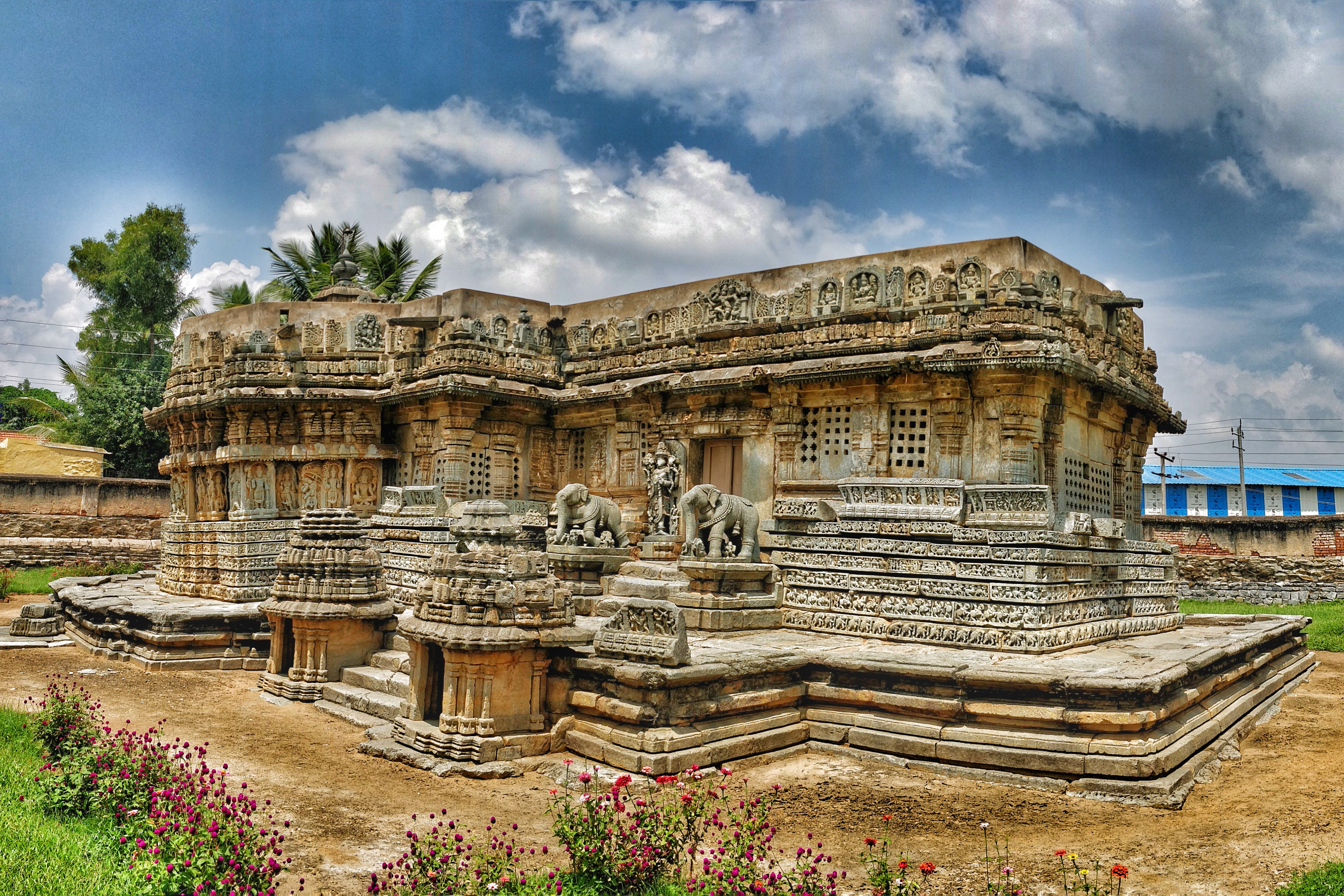
Basaralu Mallikarjuna Temple

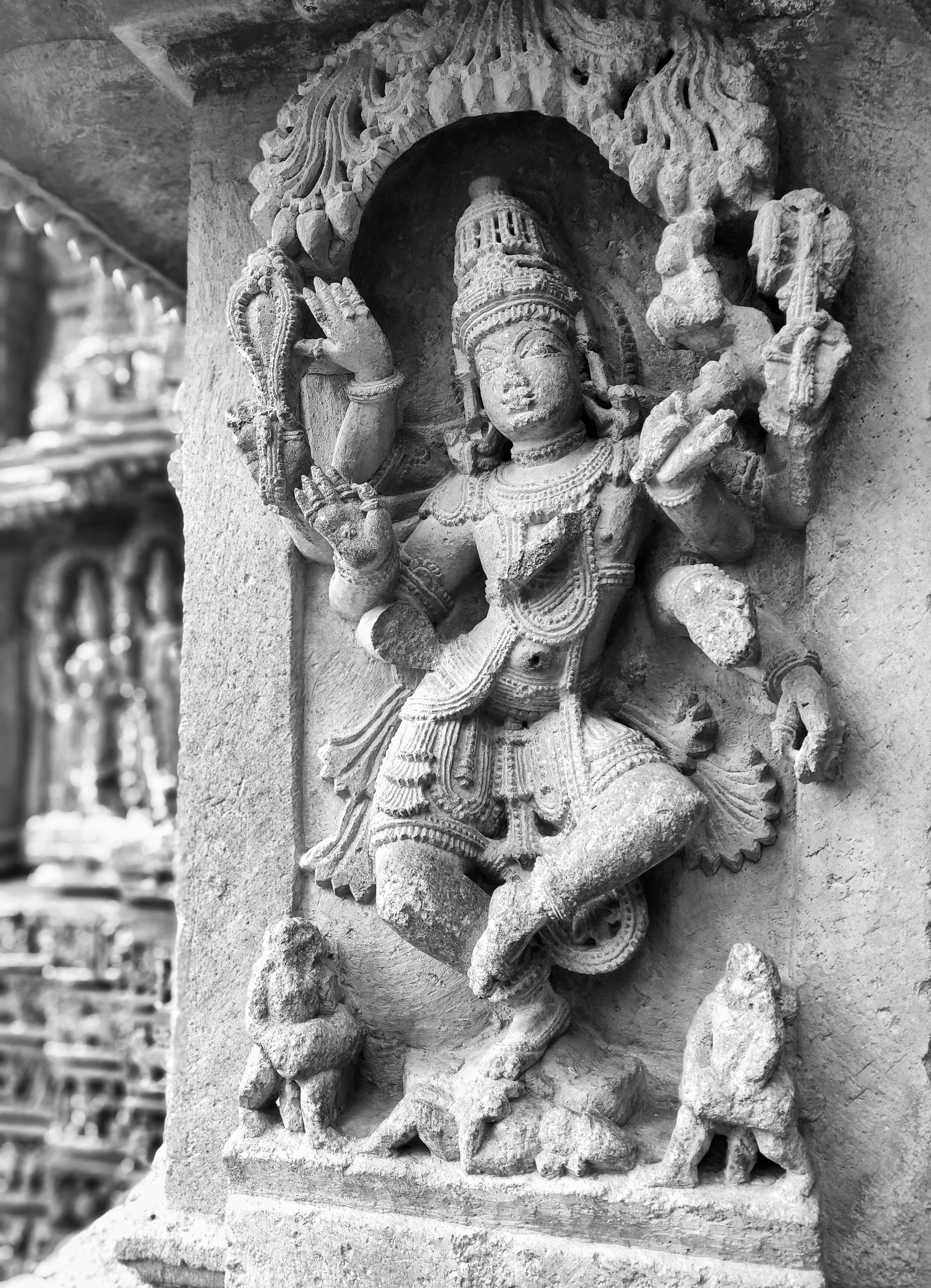
Artwork on the outer wall of Basaralu temple

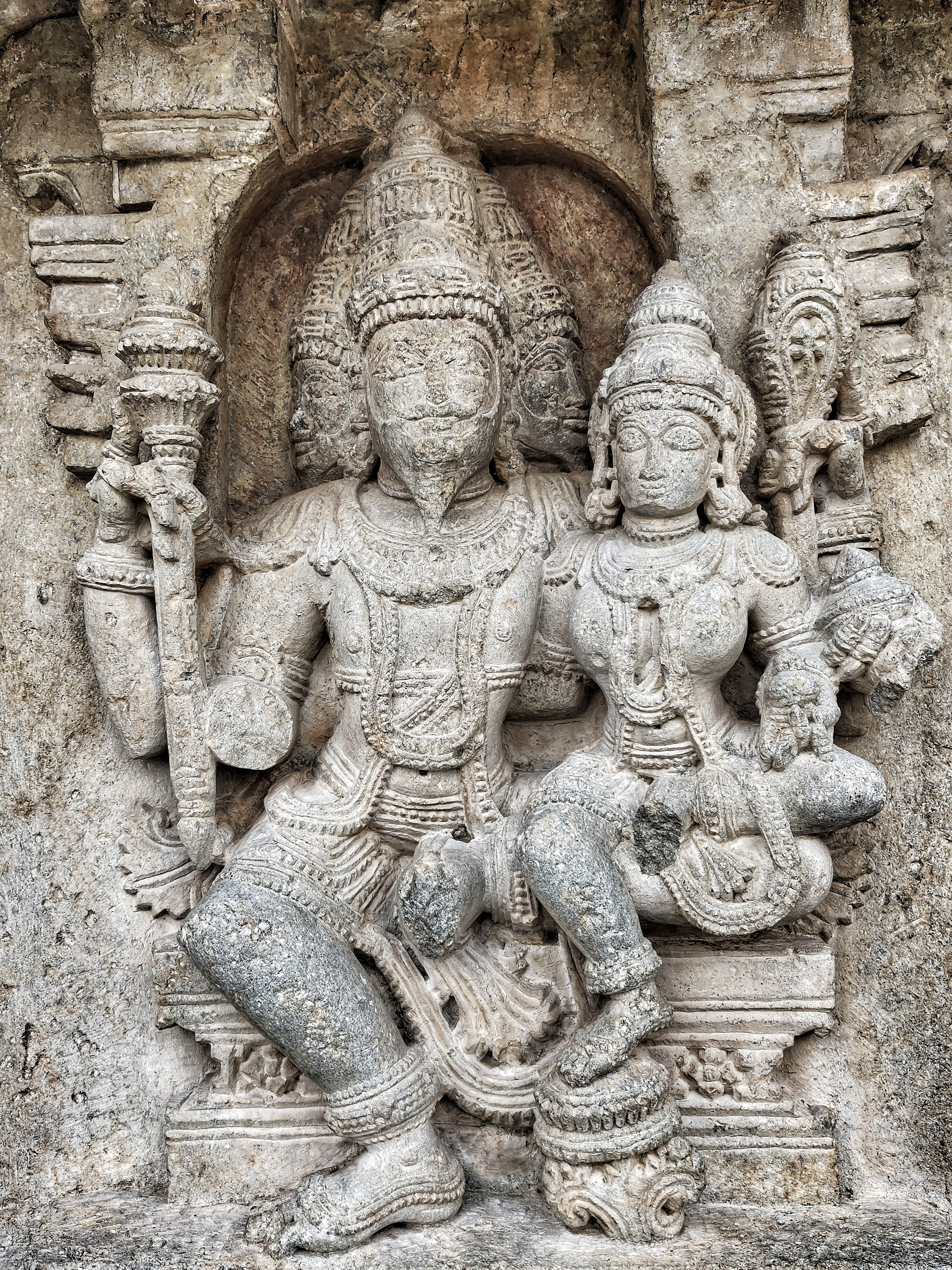
Lakshmi Narasimha - Basaralu

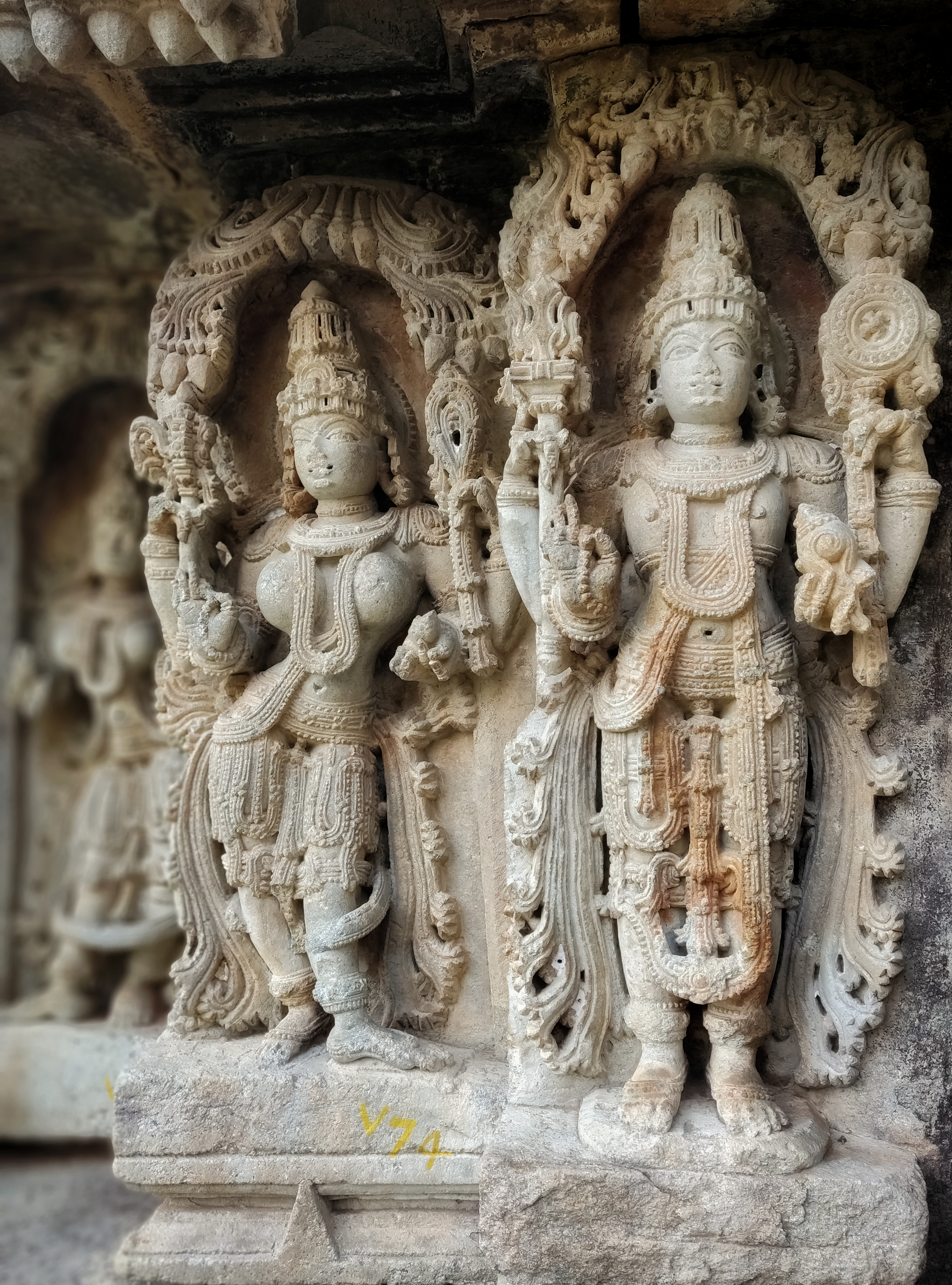
Sculpture on the outer wall of Basaralu temple

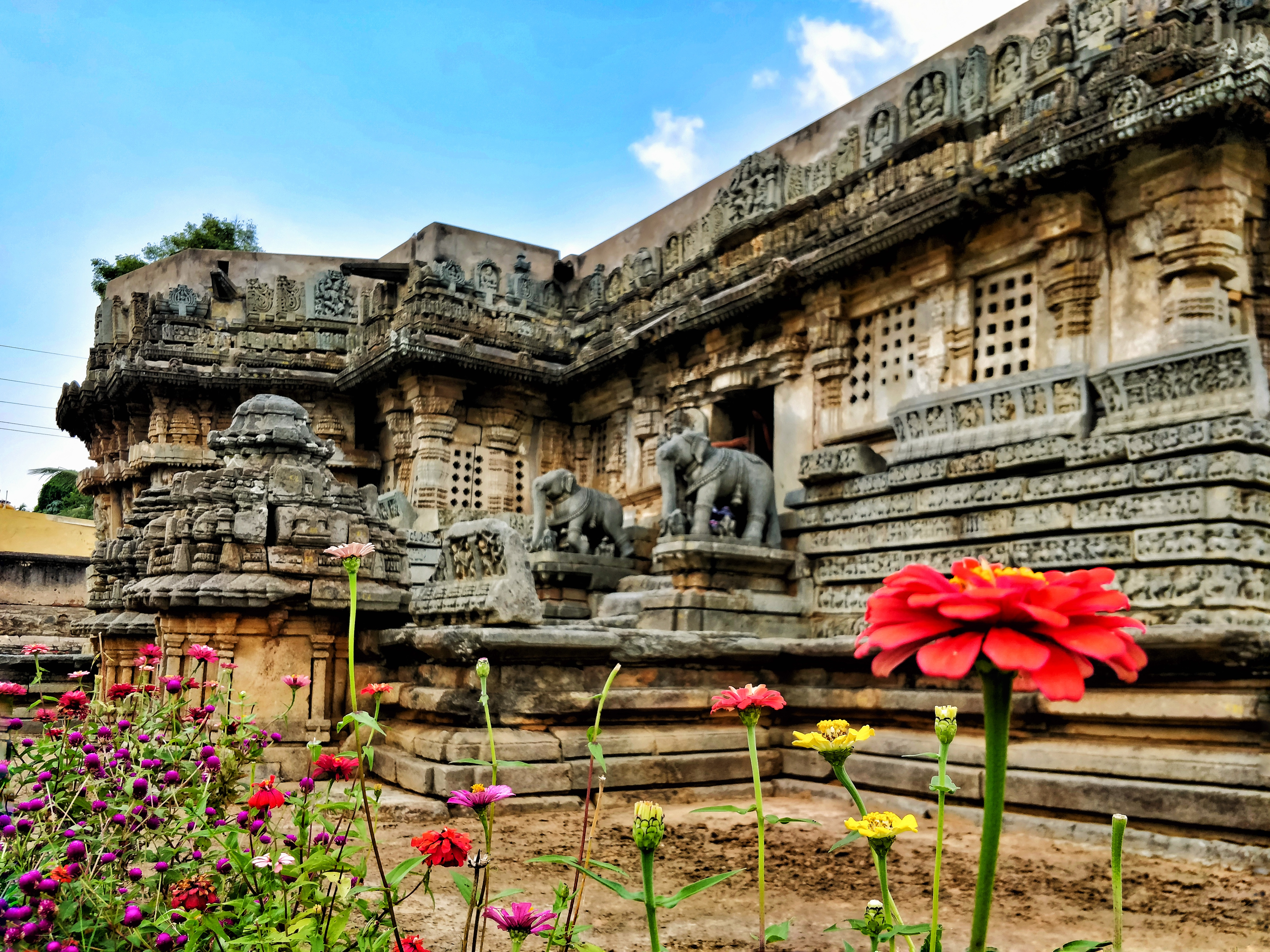
Basaralu Mallikarjuna temple garden

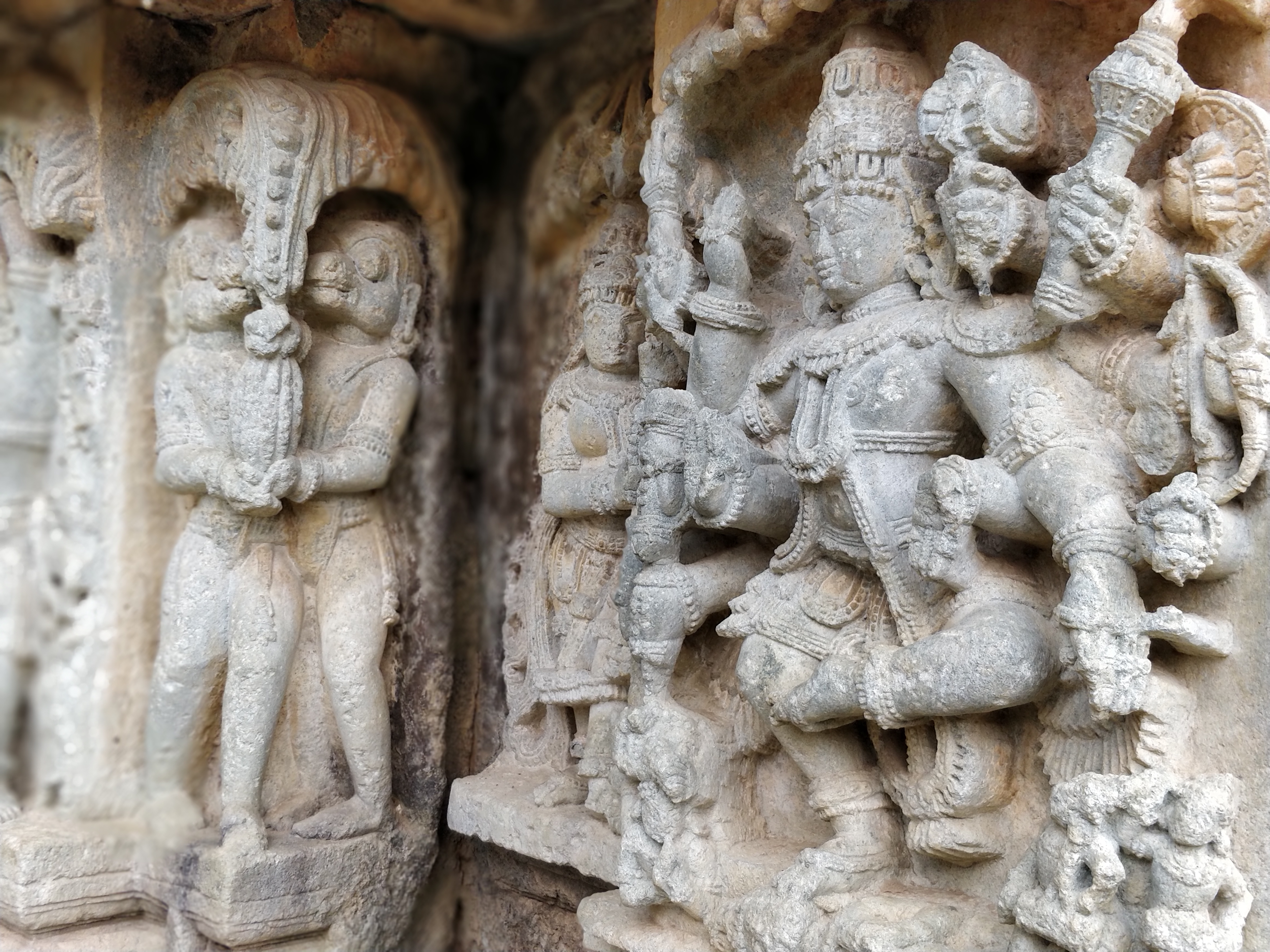
Sculpture on the outer wall of the temple

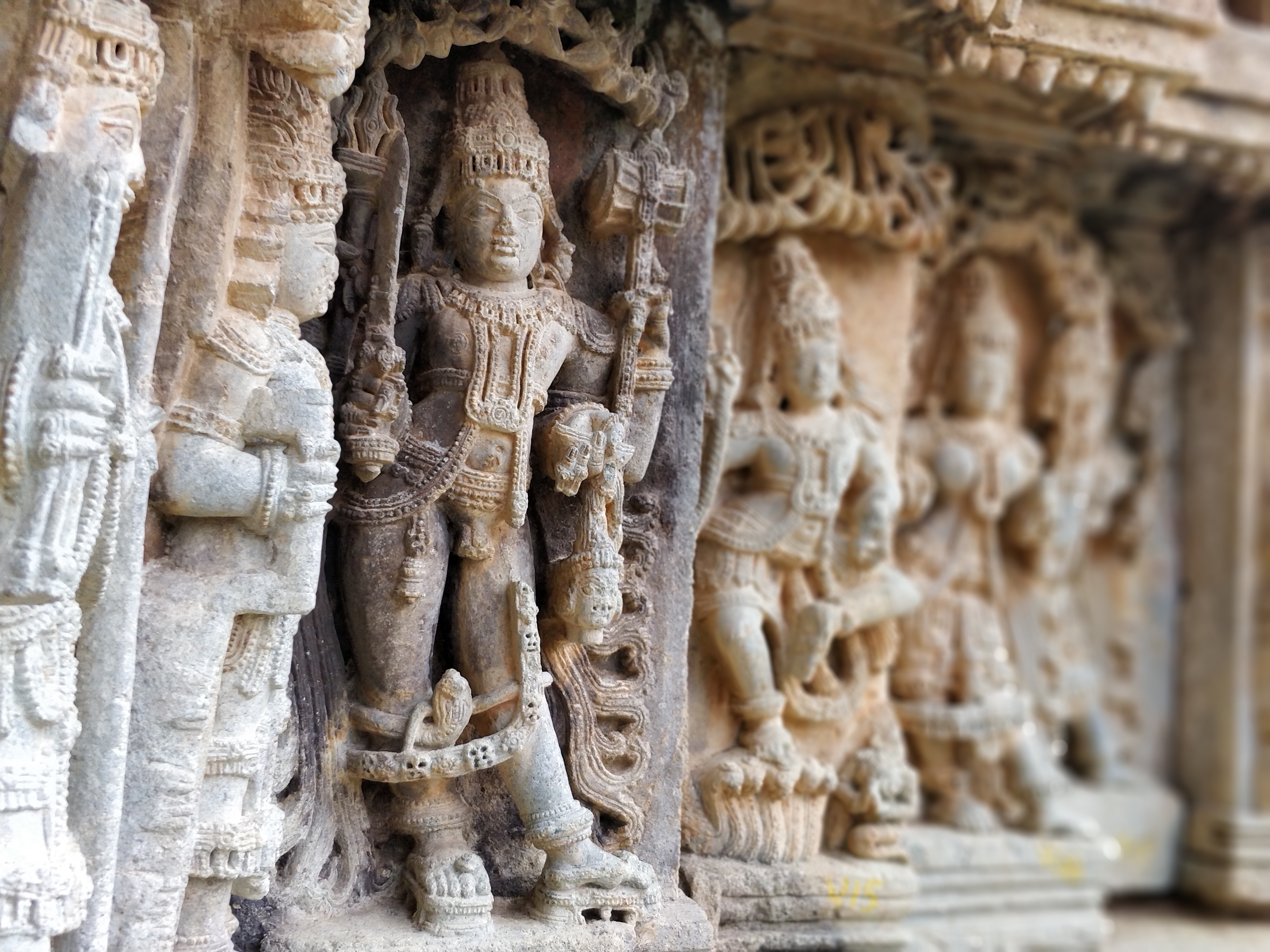
Sculpture on the outer wall of the temple

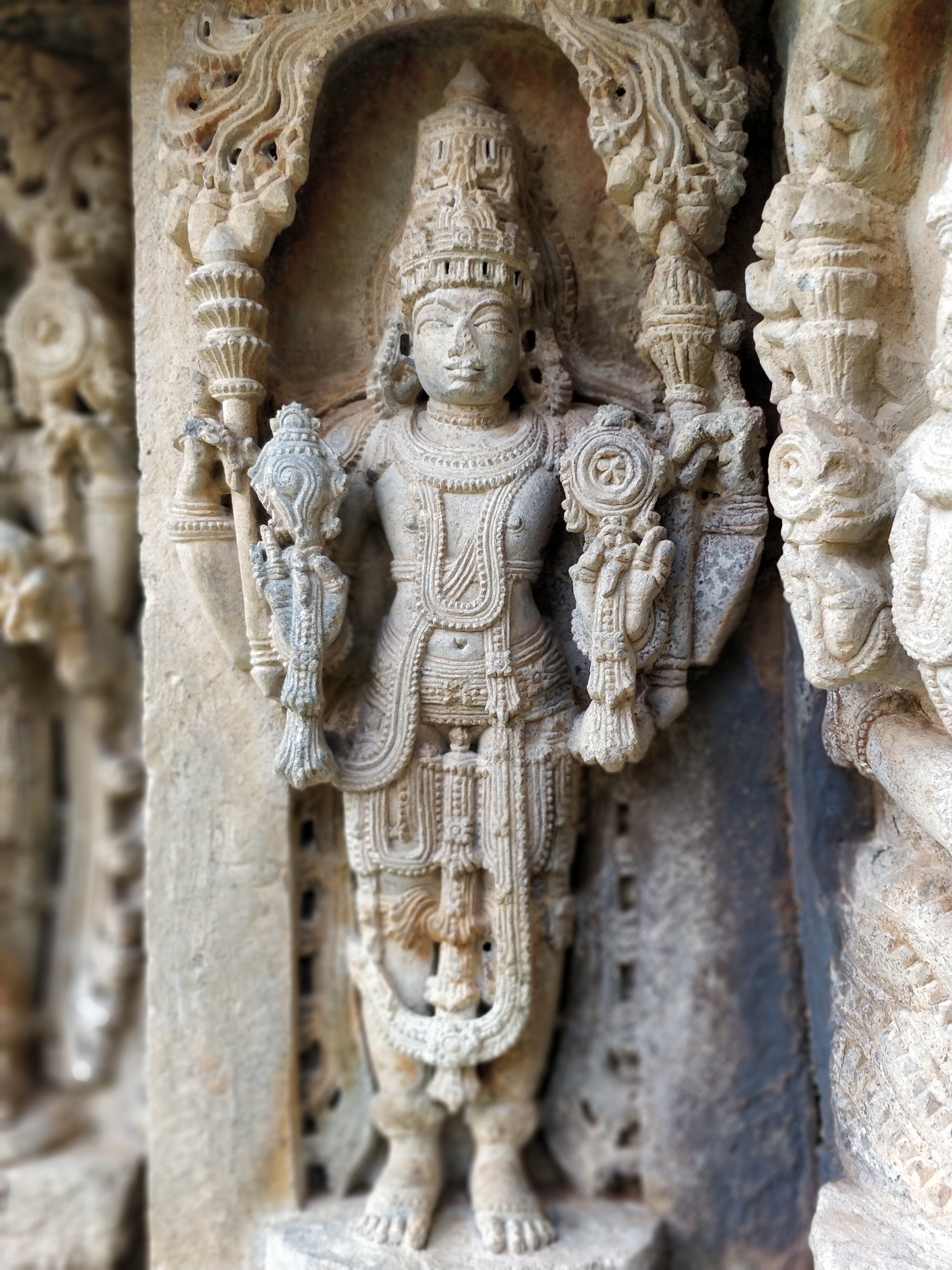
Sculpture on the outer wall of the temple

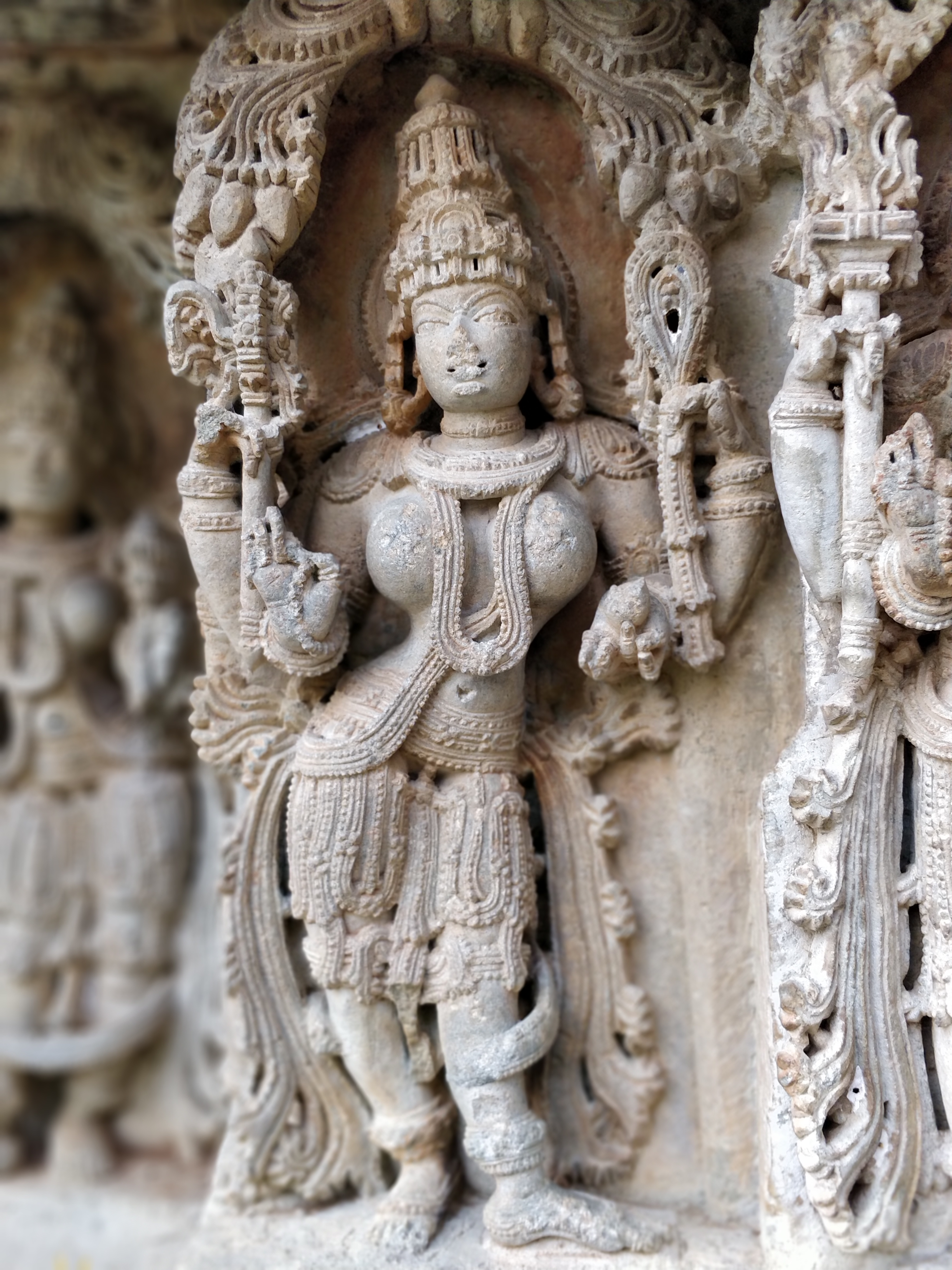
Sculpture on the outer wall of the temple
