= Mallikarjuna Temple, Basaralu =

Mallikarjuna Temple
- Hindu temple
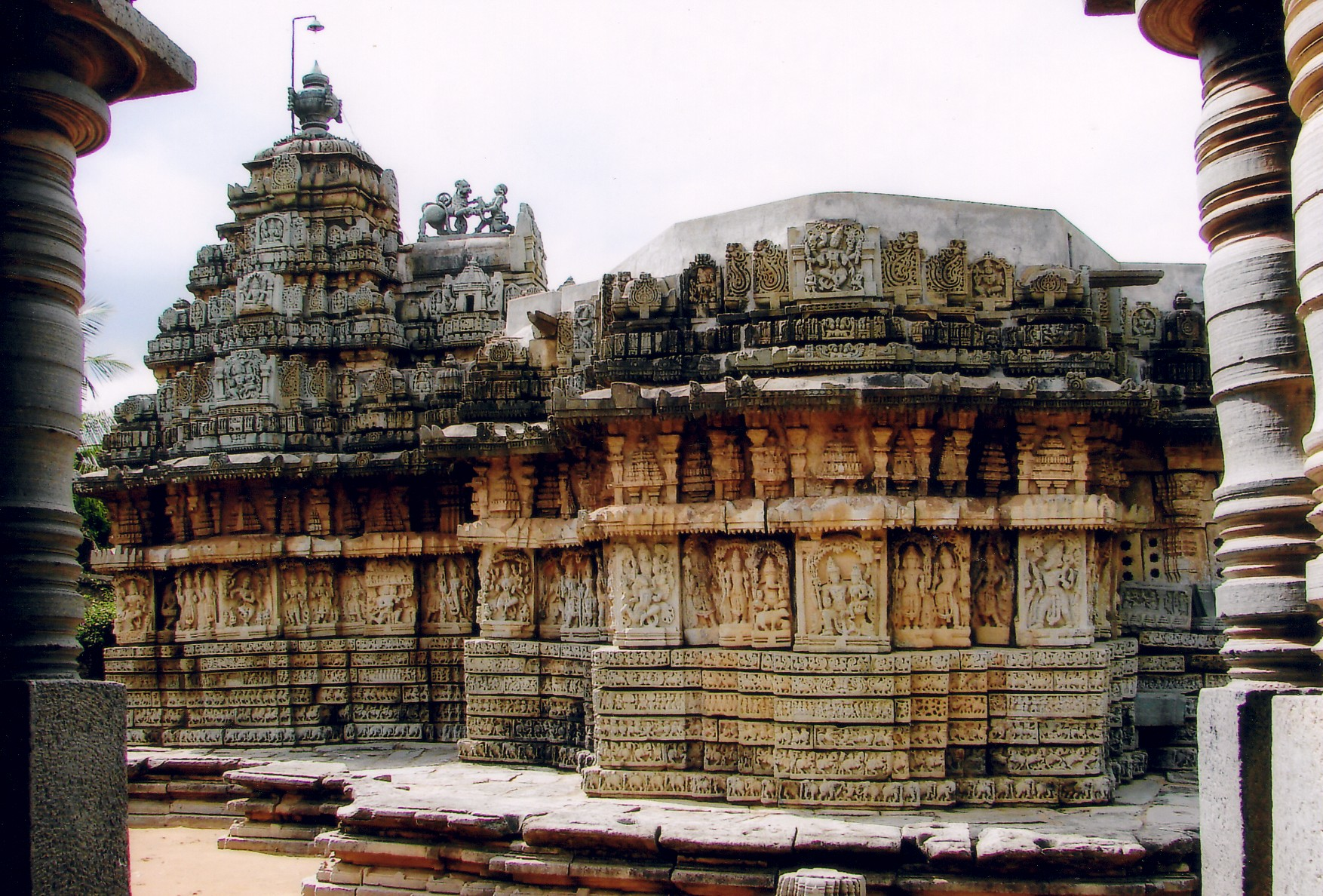
- Mallikarjuna temple (1234 A.D.) at Basaralu in Mandya district
- Interactive map of Mallikarjuna Temple
- Country: India
- State: Karnataka
- District: Mandya District

Languages
  - Official: Kannada
- Time zone: UTC+5:30 (IST)

The Mallikarjuna temple, dedicated to the Hindu god Shiva, is in Basaralu, a small town in the Mandya district, Karnataka state, India. Basaralu is close to Nagamangala and about 65 km from the culturally important city of Mysore. The temple was built by Harihara Dhannayaka around 1234 A.D. during the rule of the Hoysala Empire King Vira Narasimha II. This temple is protected as a monument of national importance by the Archaeological Survey of India.

== Temple plan ==
=== Overview ===
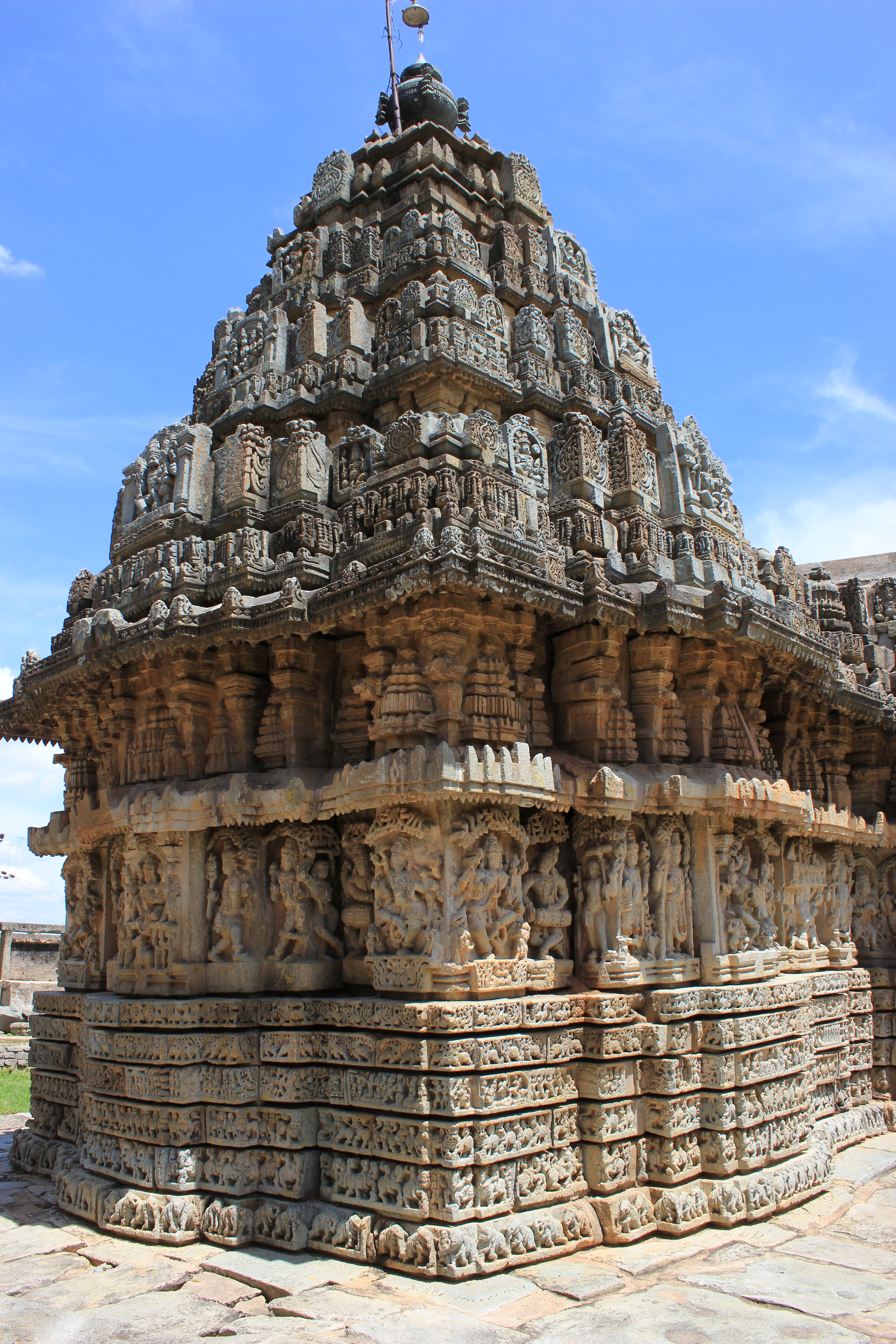
Stellate vimana (shrine and superstructure) of the Mallikarjuna temple at Basaralu

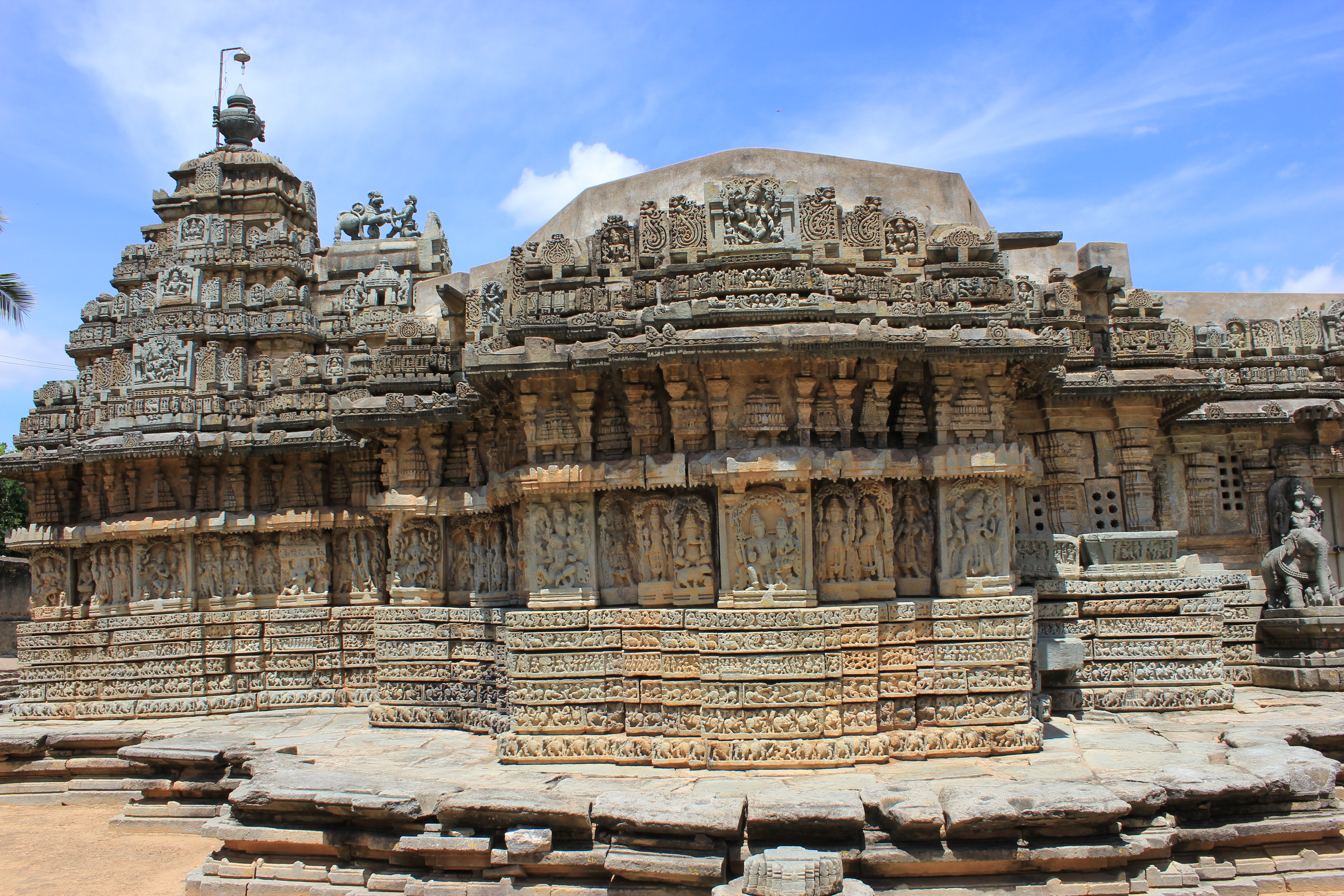
View of the Mallikarjuna temple at Basaralu from entrance

The temple is a highly ornate example of Hoysala architecture. The temple plan is that of a trikuta (three shrined), though only the middle one has a superstructure (tower or shikhara) and a sukhanasi (nose or tower over the vestibule). The three shrines are connected by a common hall (mantapa) which is unique in that it mixes characteristics of an open and a closed hall. The lateral shrines are connected directly to the hall while the middle shrine has a vestibule that connects the sanctum (cella or vimana) to the hall.

Since the lateral shrines have no tower over them and are directly connected to the hall without a vestibule and its corresponding tower like projection, they do not appear like shrines from the outside. Rather, they are absorbed into the walls of the hall. The central shrine on the contrary is highly visible because of its tower and the sukhanasi that projects prominently from the tower. The cella in the central shrine has a linga (the universal symbol of the god Shiva) while the lateral shrines contain an image of surya (the sun) and a pair of nagas (snakes).

The temple stands on a platform called jagati, a feature common to many Hoysala temples. The platform, in addition to its visual appeal, is meant to provide devotees a path for circumambulation (pradakshinapatha) around the temple. It closely follows the outline of the temple, giving it a good elevated look. It has two flights of steps leading to each lateral entrance of the temple. The tower over the central shrine and the vestibule (sukhanasi or nose) are intact and highly decorative. The other standard features of a Hoysala temple; the large domed roof over the tower (called "helmet" or amalaka), the kalasa on top of it (the decorative water-pot at the apex of the helmet) and the Hoysala crest (emblem of the Hoysala warrior stabbing a lion) over the sukhanasi are all intact, adding to the decorative look. The dome is actually a heavy, well sculptured "helmet" over the tower and is the largest piece of sculpture in the temple (2x2 meters). Its shape usually follows that of the shrine and hence can be either square or star shaped.

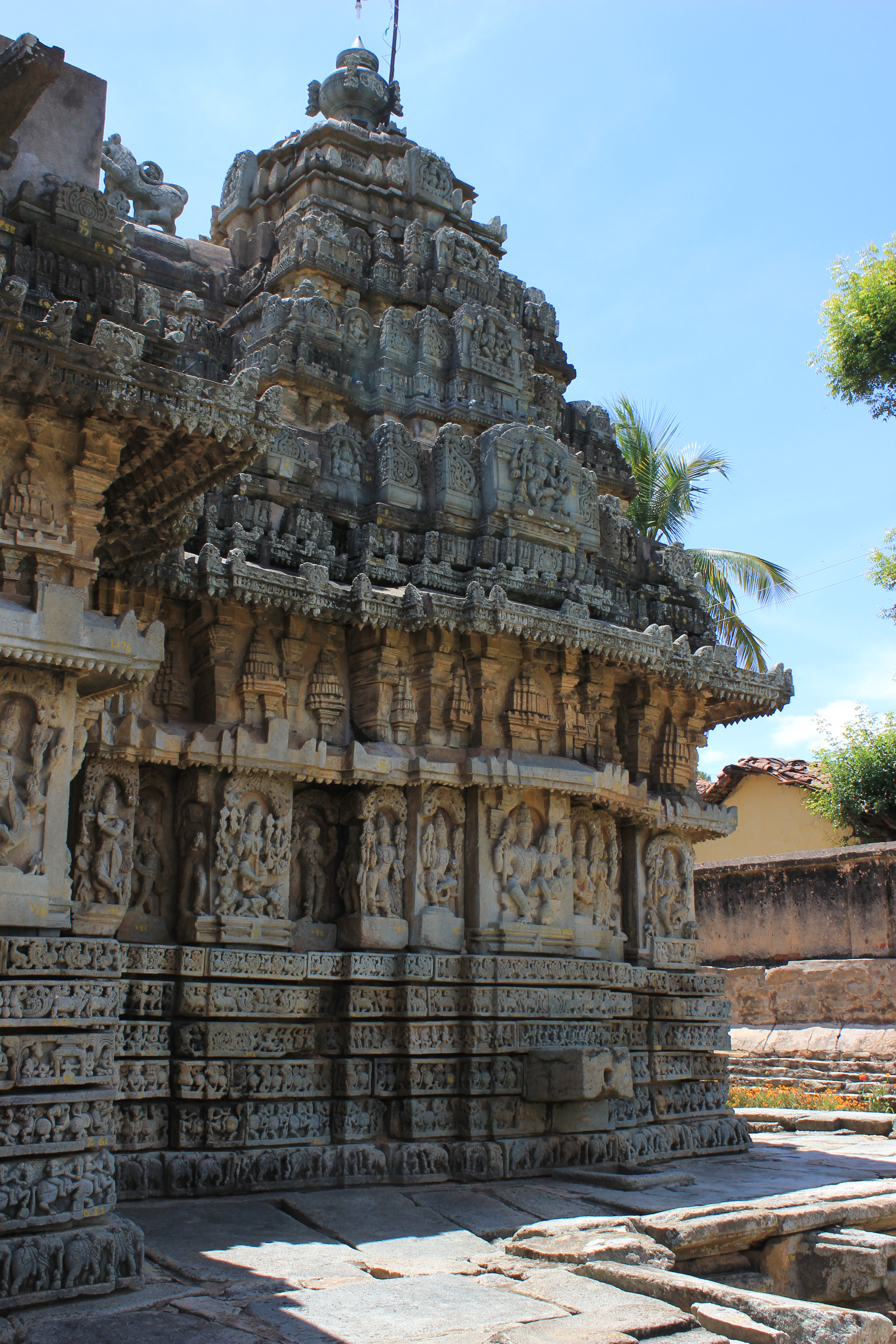
Profile of vesara style vimana (shrine and superstructure) in the Mallikarjuna temple at Basaralu

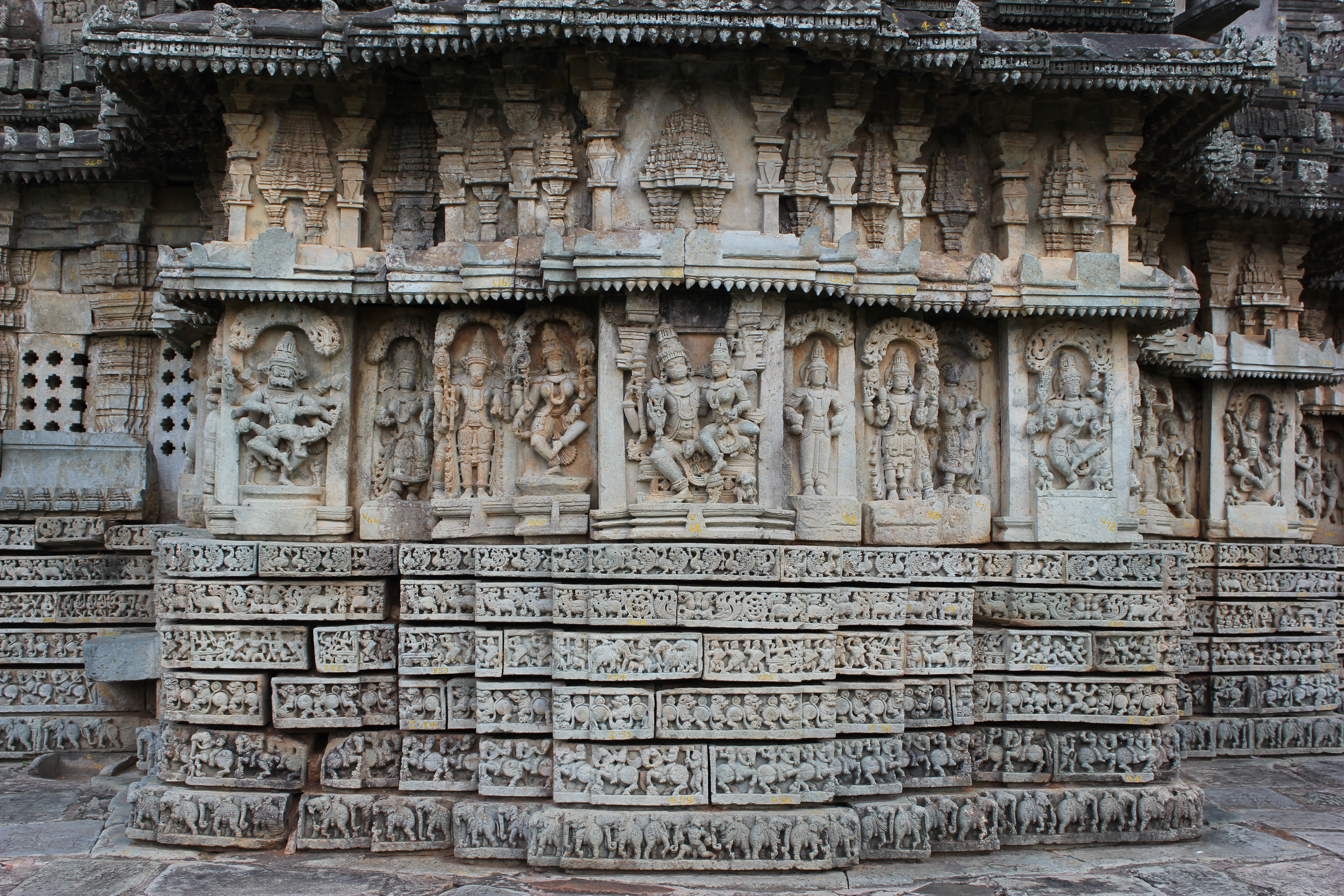
Close up of wall relief articulation comprising (from bottom to top) molding friezes, above which is the panel of Hindu deities below the lower eve, and decorative aedicula between lower and upper eves in Mallikarjuna temple at Basaralu

=== Decoration and sculptures ===
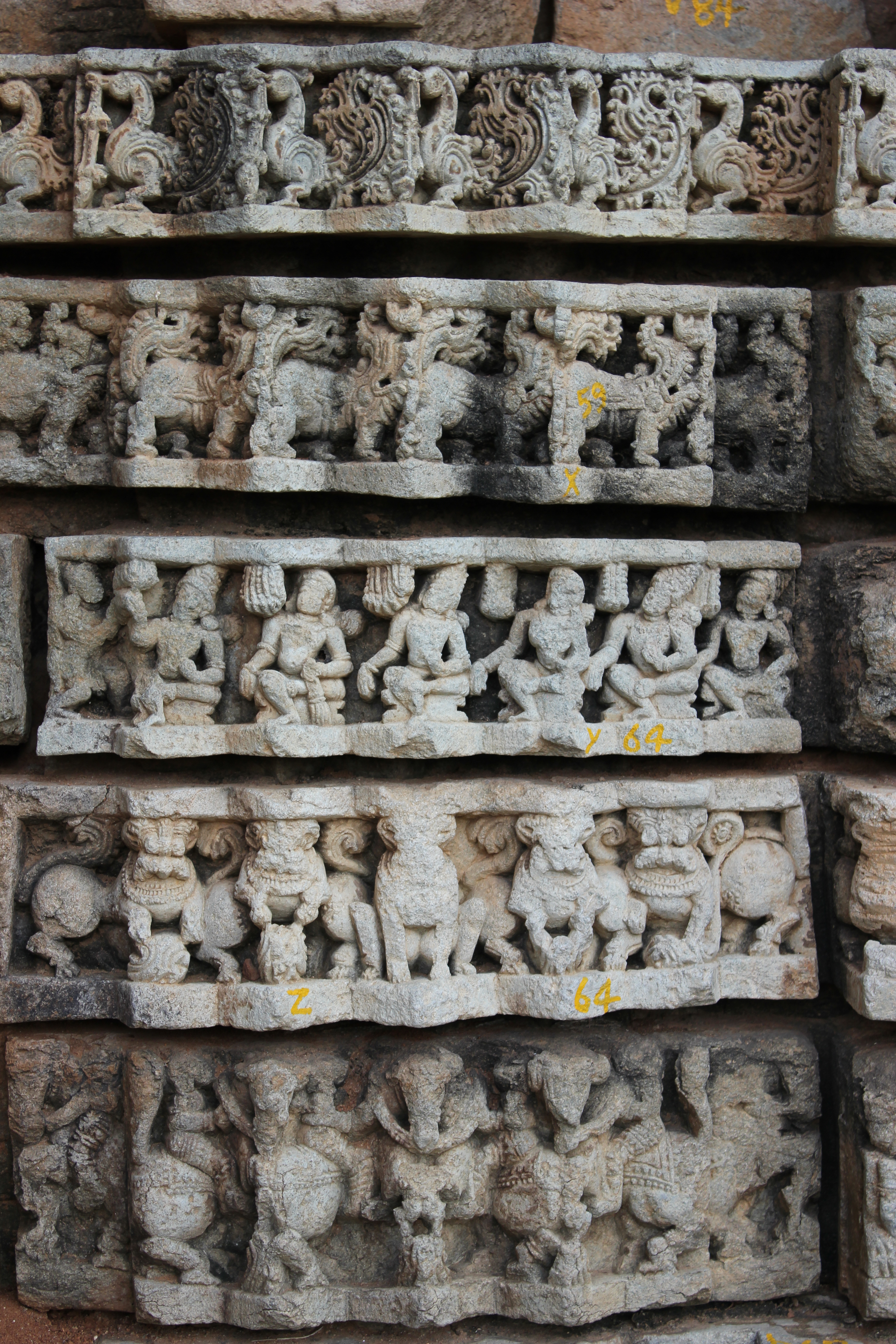
Close up of molding bas-relief. The friezes are (from bottom to top) horses, lions, puranic figures, mythical beasts (makara) and swans (hansa)

The decorative plan of the walls of the shrines and the mantapa (hall) is of the "new kind", with two eaves that run around the temple. The wall panel images have the same quality of workmanship seen in the more famous temples at Belur and Halebidu, though the images are smaller and simpler. In the "new kind" of decorative articulation, the first heavy eaves runs below the superstructure and all around the temple with a projection of about half a meter. The second eaves runs around the temple about a meter below the first. Between the two eaves are the miniature decorative towers (Aedicula) on pilasters. Below the second eaves are the wall panel of images of Hindu deities and their attendants in relief.

Below this, at the base are the six equal width rectangular moldings (frieze). Starting from the top, the friezes depict hansa (birds) in the first frieze, makara (aquatic monsters) in the second (though often interrupted with kirtimukhas in this temple), epics and other stories in the third (which in this case is from the Hindu epic Ramayana, the Mahabharata, and stories of Krishna), lions in the fourth (instead of the more commonly seen leafy scrolls), horses in the fifth and elephants at the bottom. At the entrance to the hall are elephant balustrades. Notable among the wall panel sculptures and depicting scenes from the epics and puranic stories are the 16-handed Shiva dancing on the head of a demon called Andhakasura, dancing images of a 22-armed Durga and Saraswati, King Ravana lifting Mount Kailash, the Pandava prince Arjuna shooting the fish target, and Draupadi rushing forth with garland, and the slaying of the demon Gajasura.

== Gallery ==
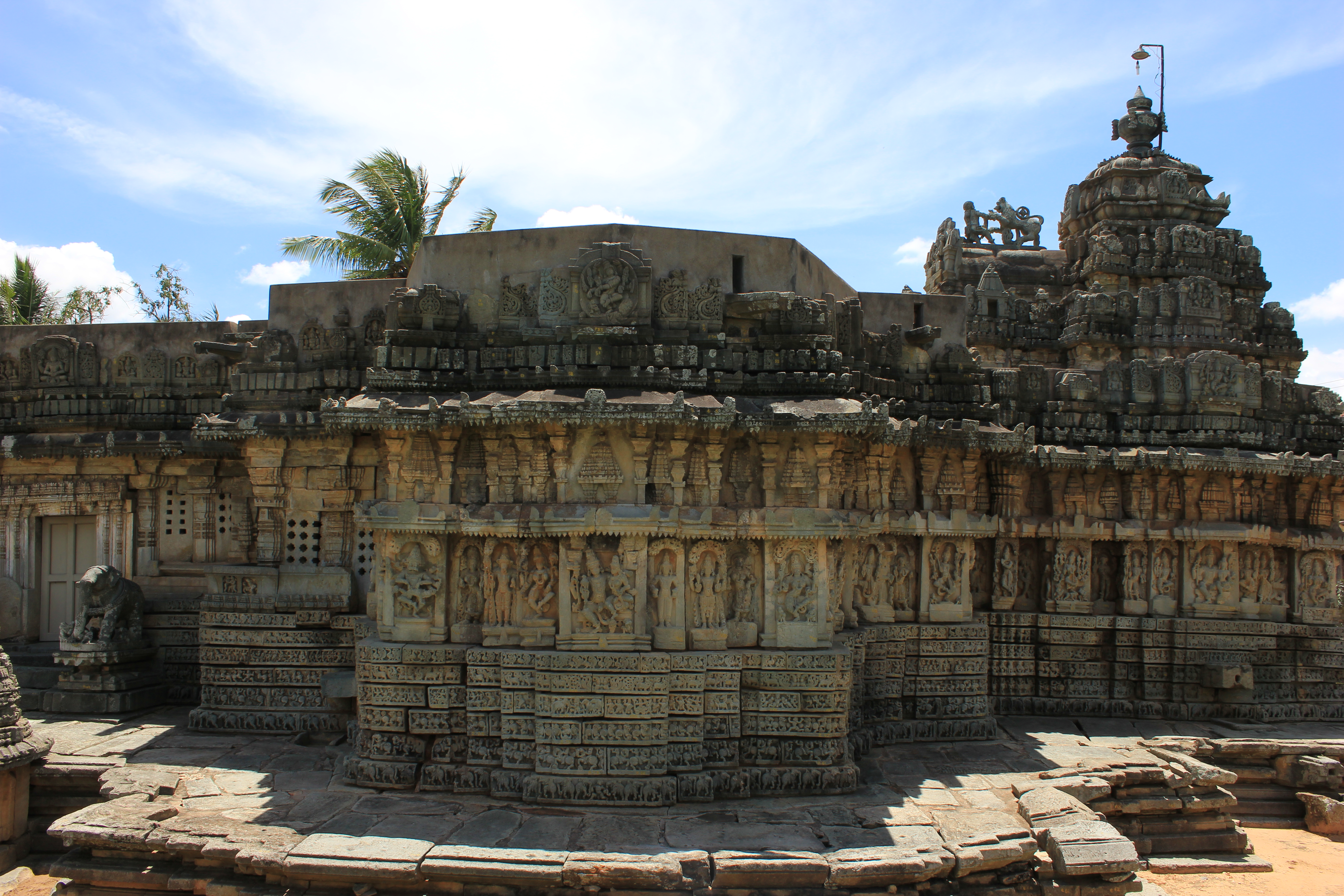
Rear of Mallikarjuna temple at Basaralu

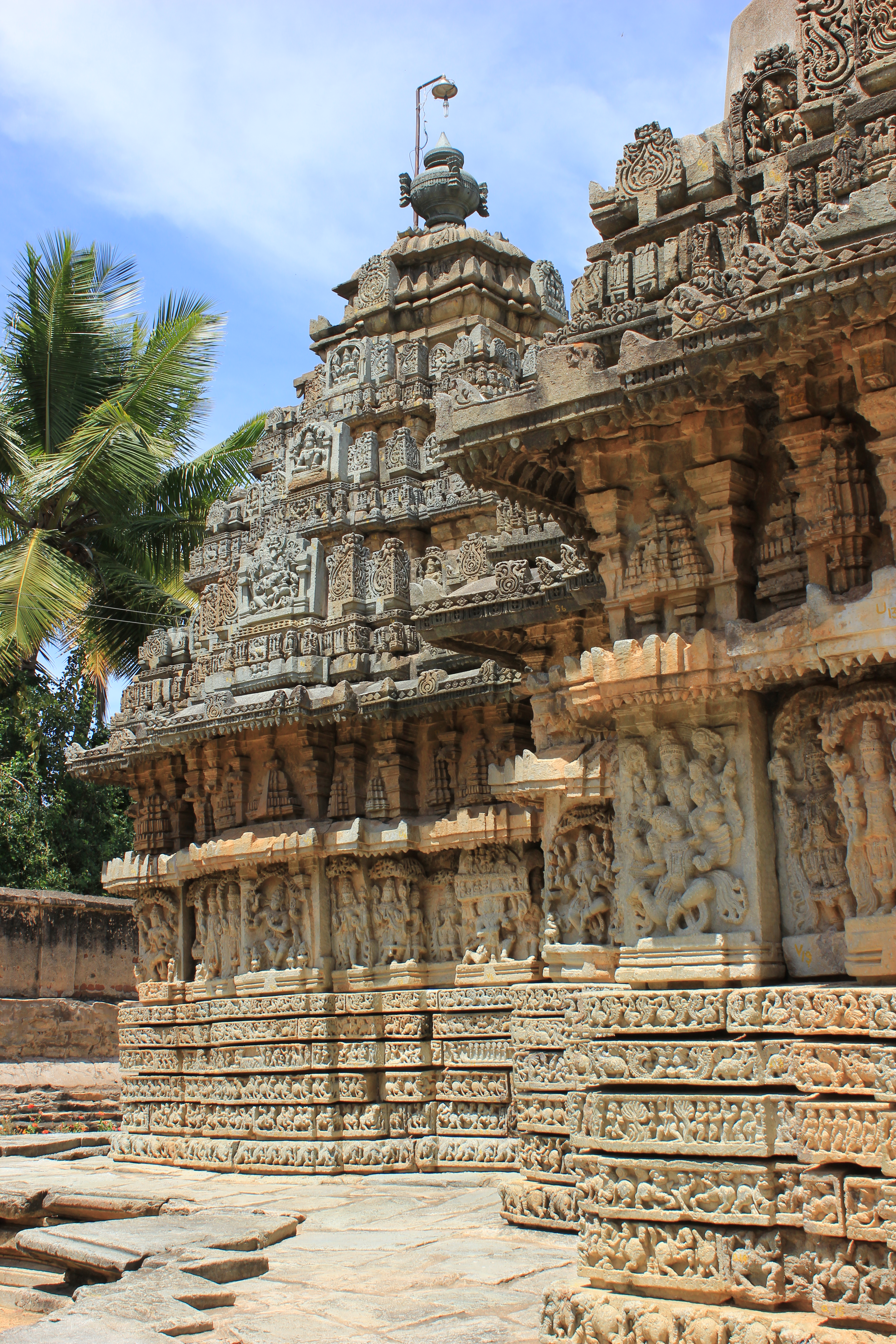
Profile of vesara shikhara (tower) and shrine of Mallikarjuna temple at Basaralu

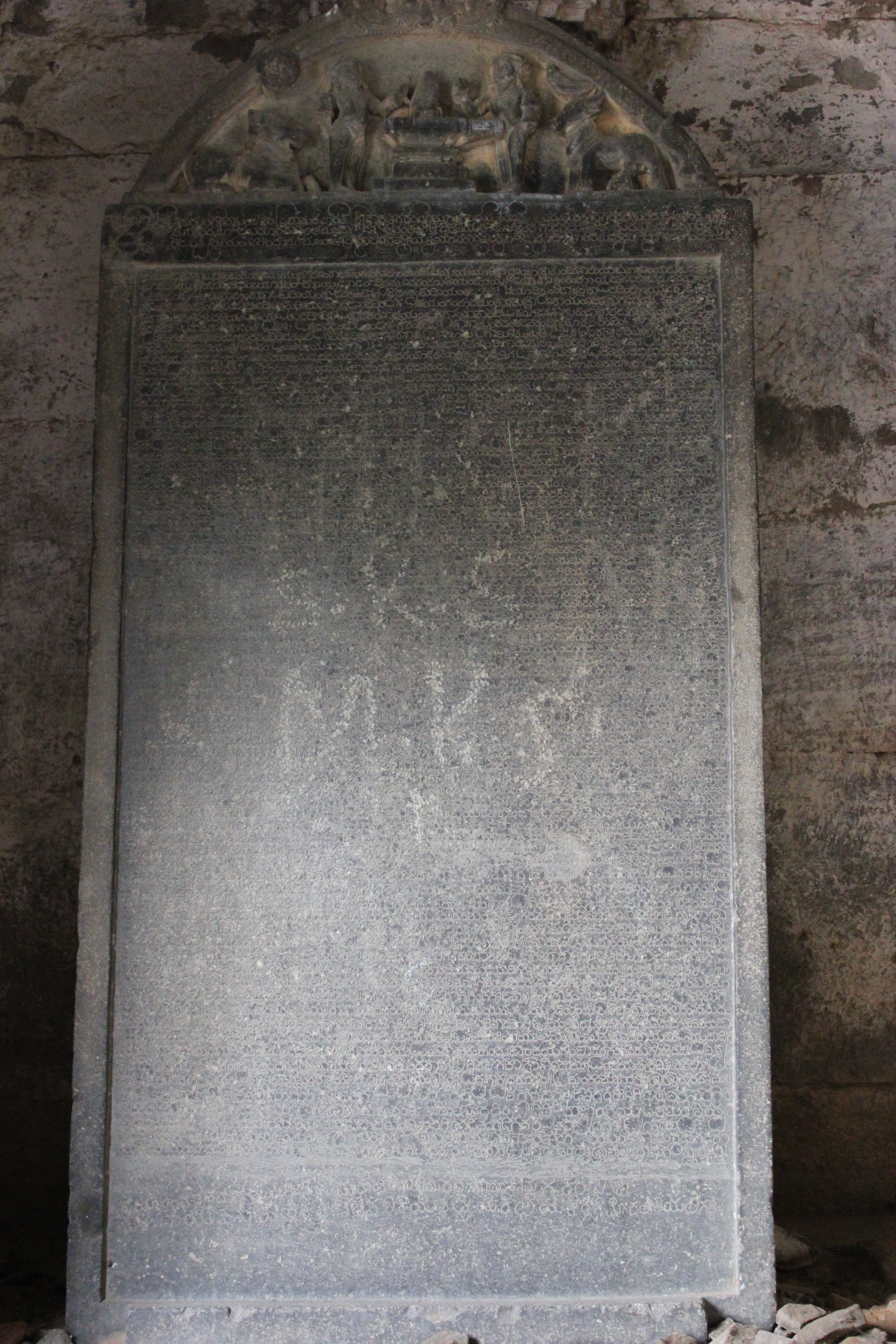
Old Kannada inscription from the Hoysala period (1235 A.D.) at the Mallikarjuna temple at Basaralu

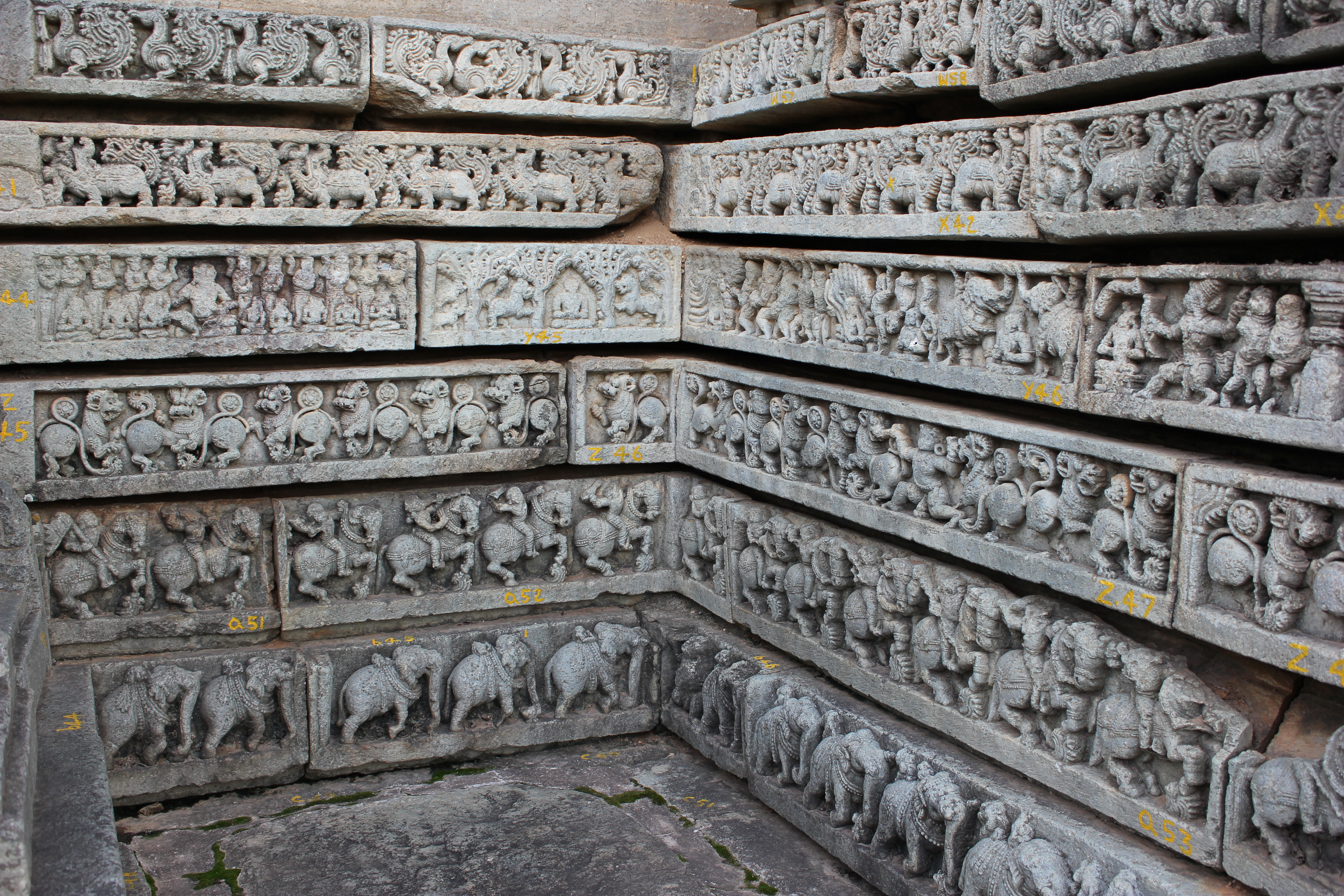
Molding frieze articulation in the Mallikarjuna temple at Basaralu

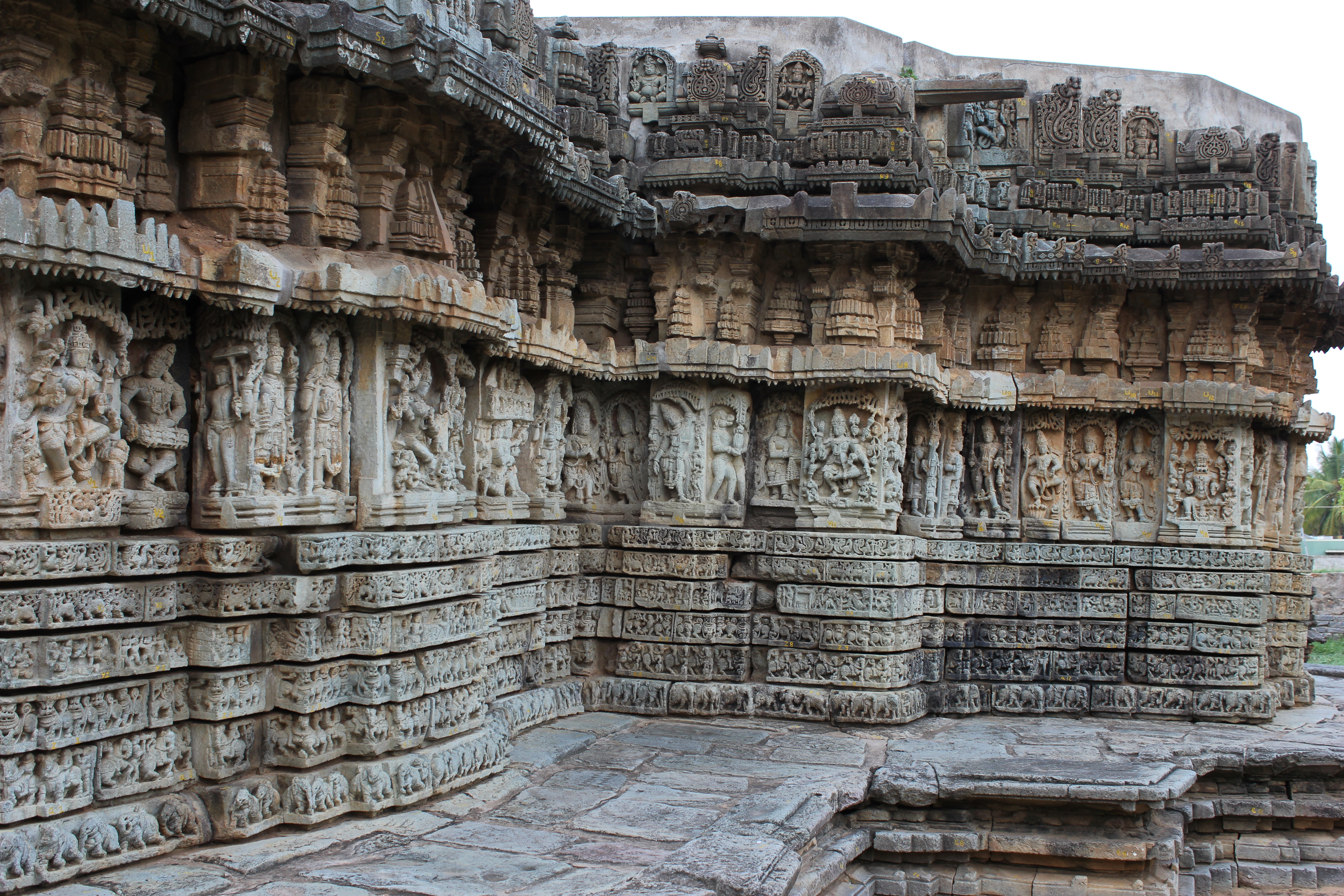
Wall relief articulation in the Mallikarjuna temple at Basaralu

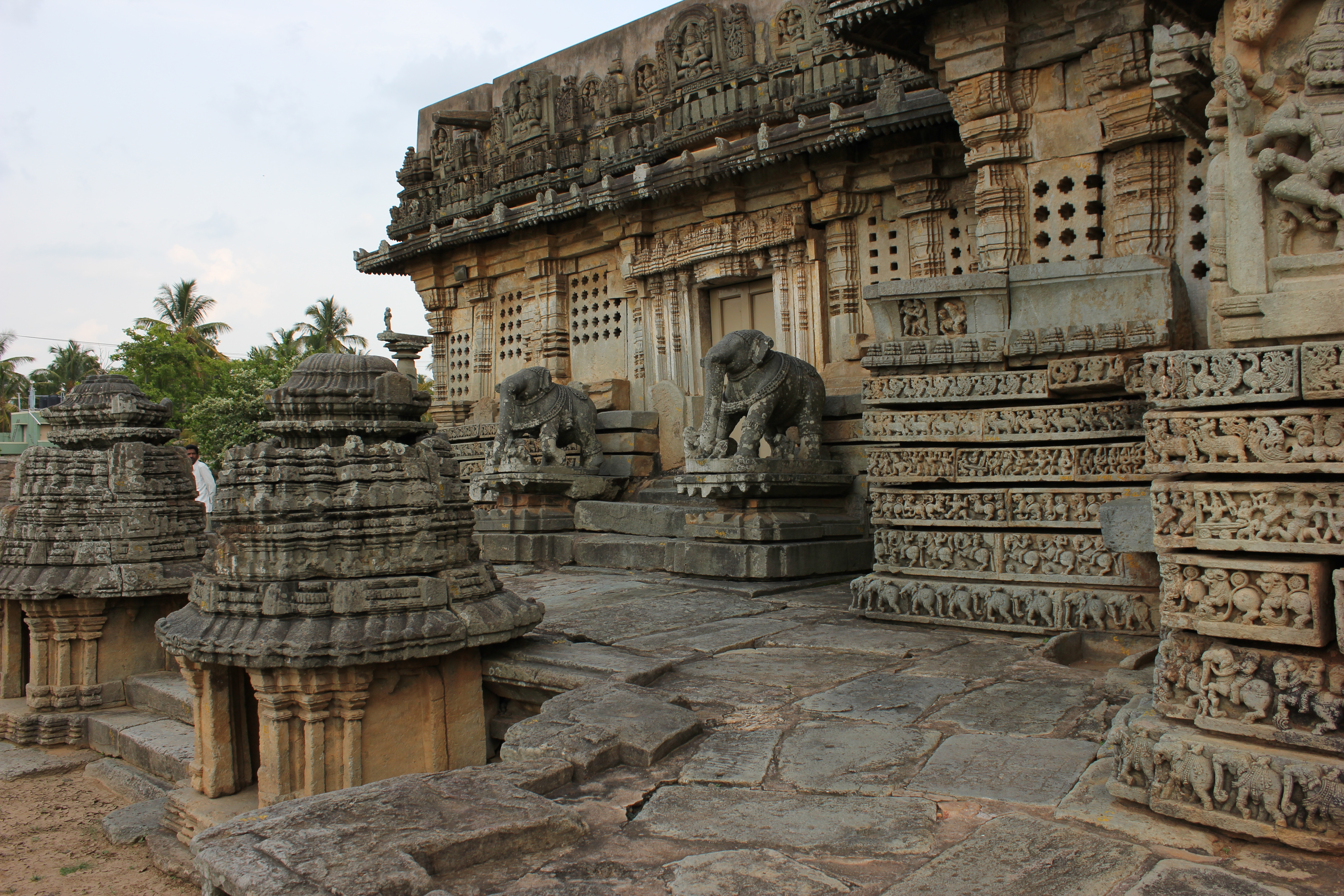
Elephant baluster entrance into the Mallikarjuna temple at Basaralu

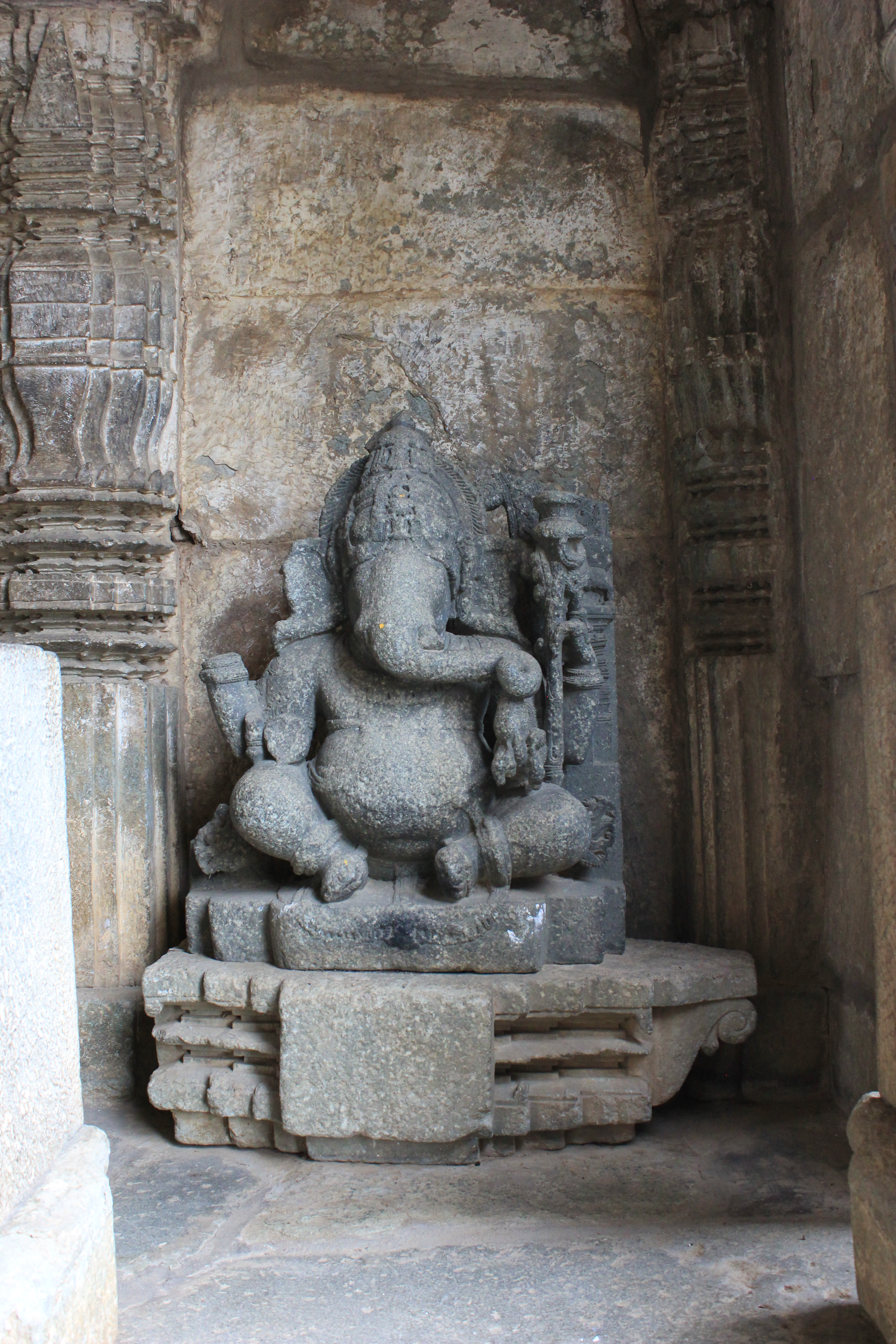
Sculpture of Ganesha in the entrance mantapa in the Mallikarjuna temple at Basaralu

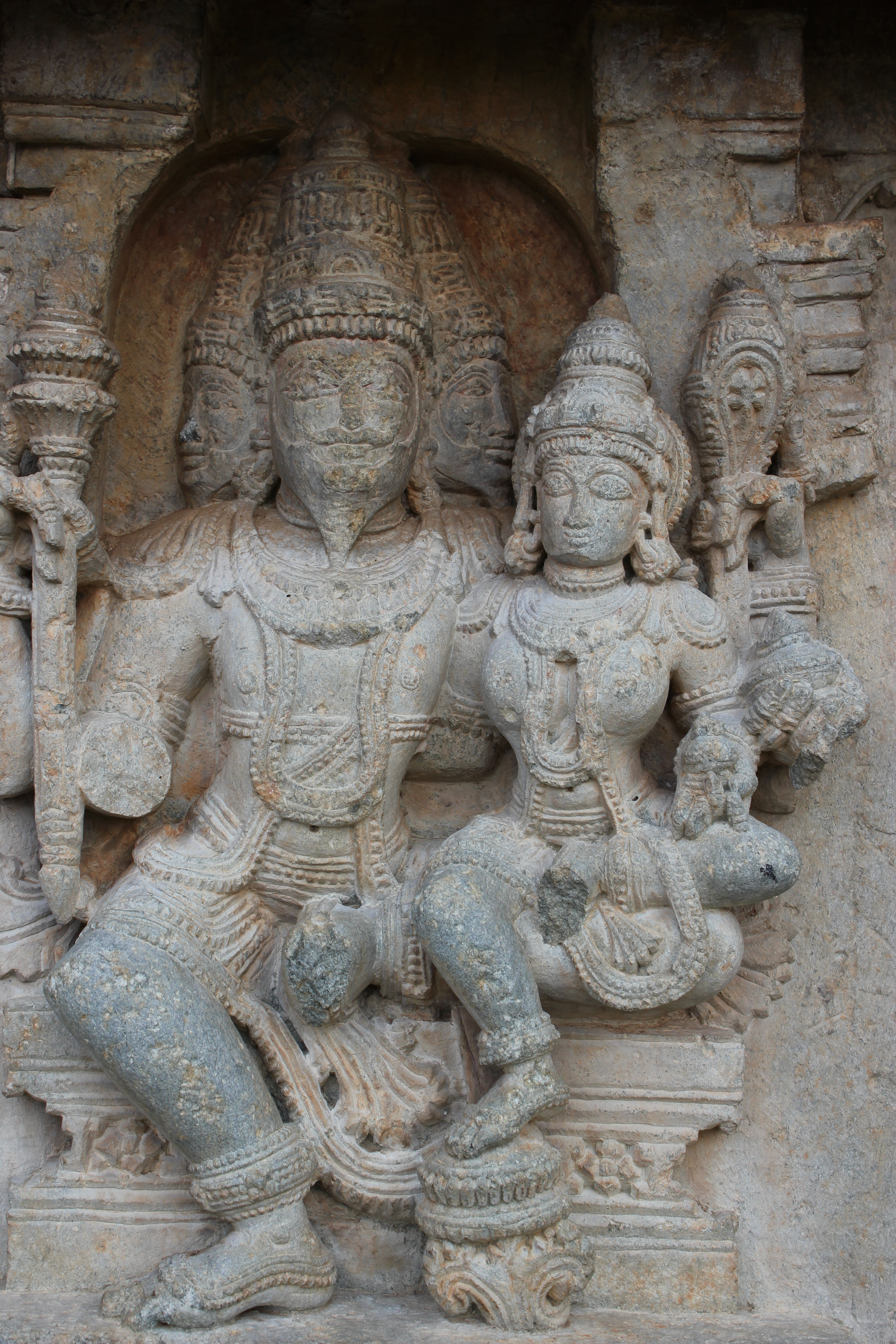
Relief of Hindu god Brahma with Saraswati in the Mallikarjuna temple at Basaralu

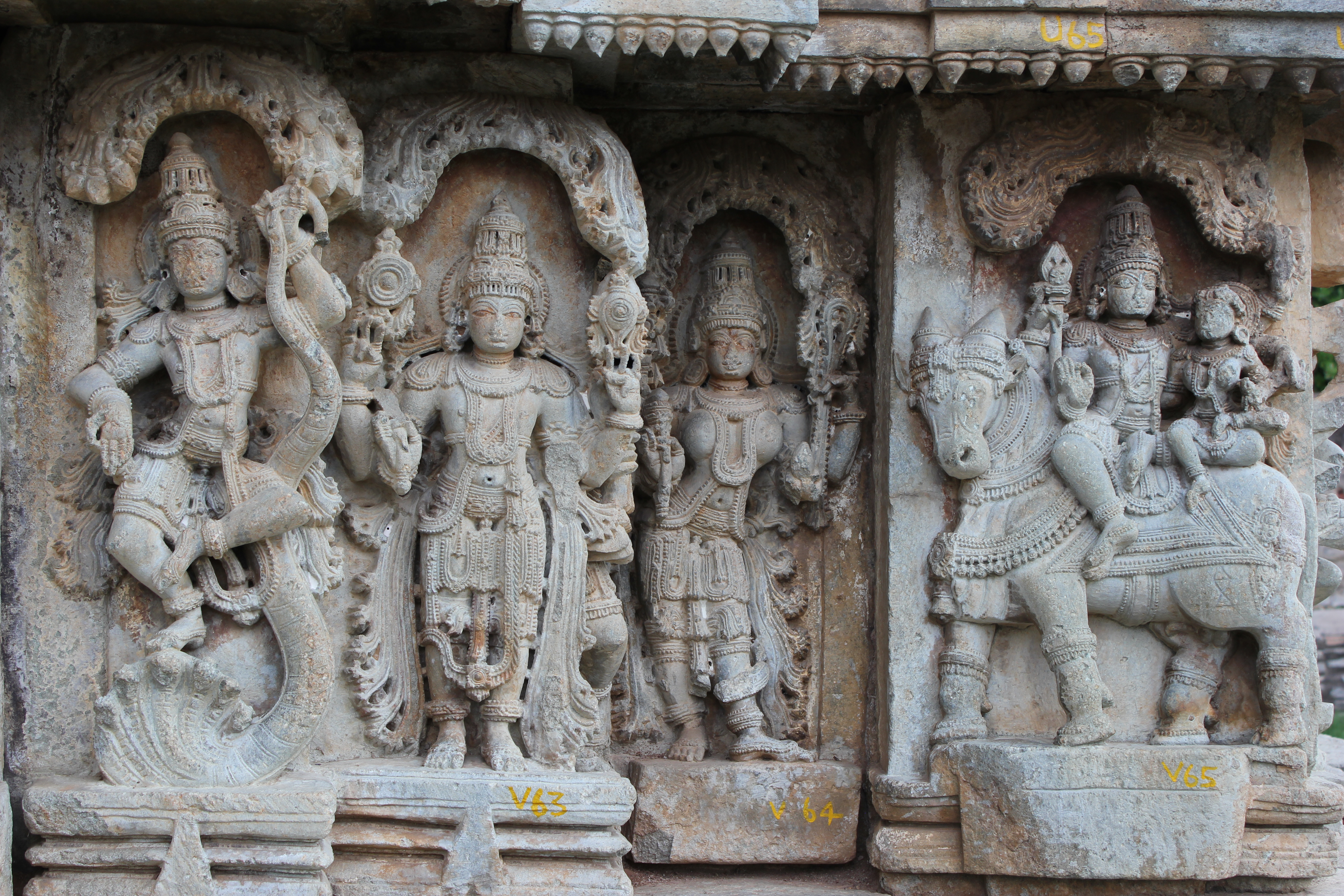
Panel relief of Hindu deities in the Mallikarjuna temple at Basaralu

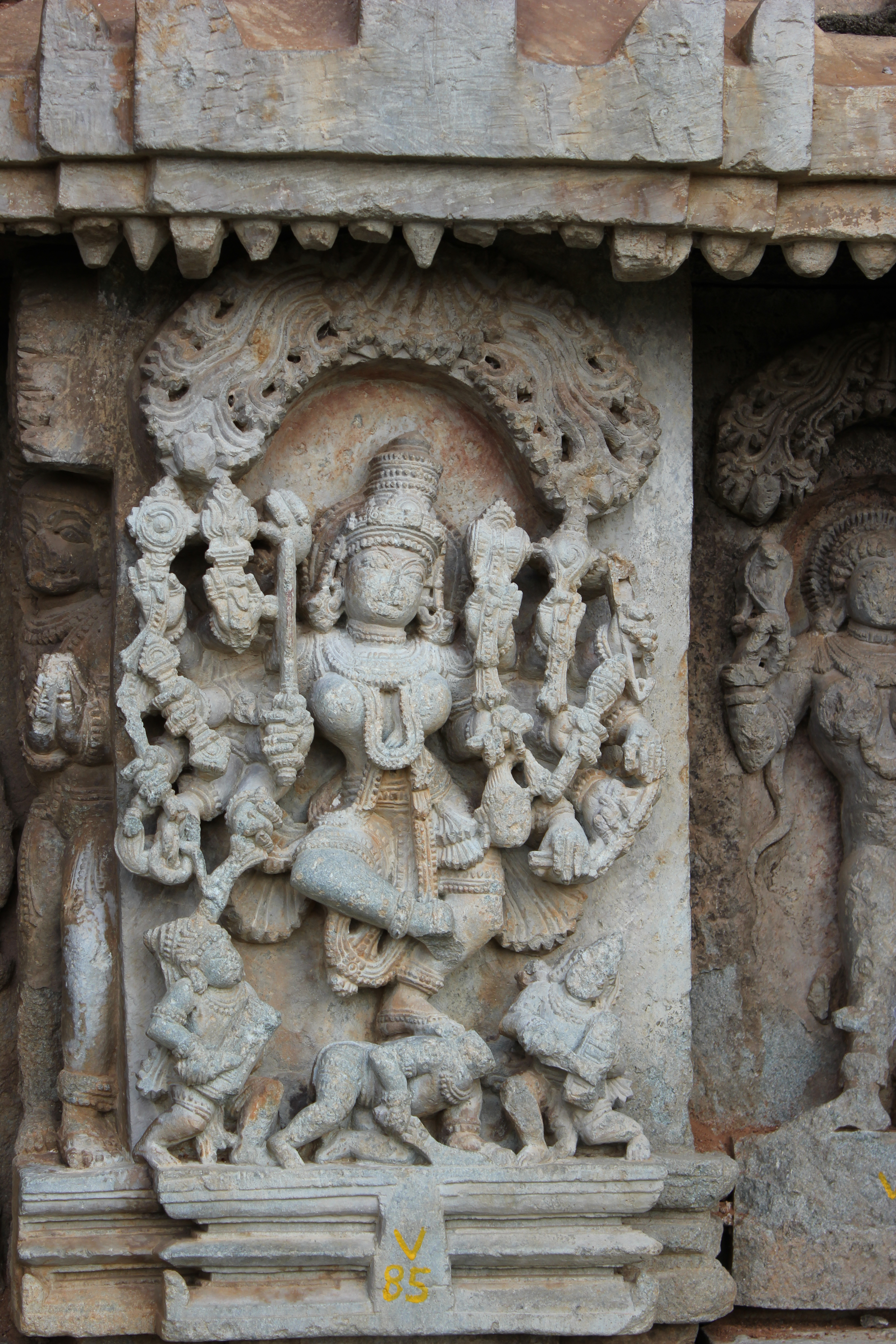
Relief of Hindu deity in the Mallikarjuna temple at Basaralu

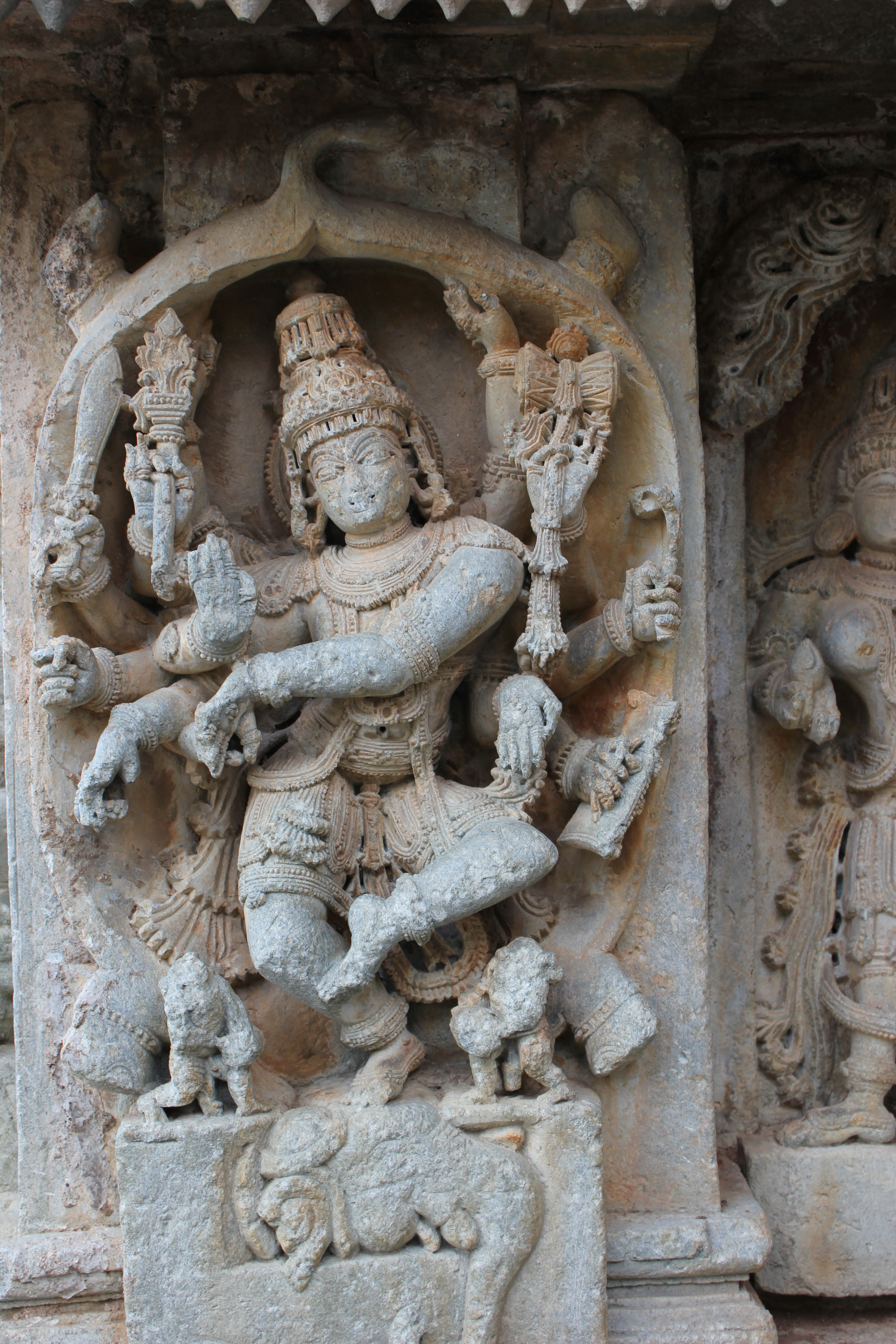
Relief of Hindu deity in the Mallikarjuna temple at Basaralu

== See also ==
- Mallikarjuna Temple, Kuruvatti
