= Birla Mandir =

Hindu Temples

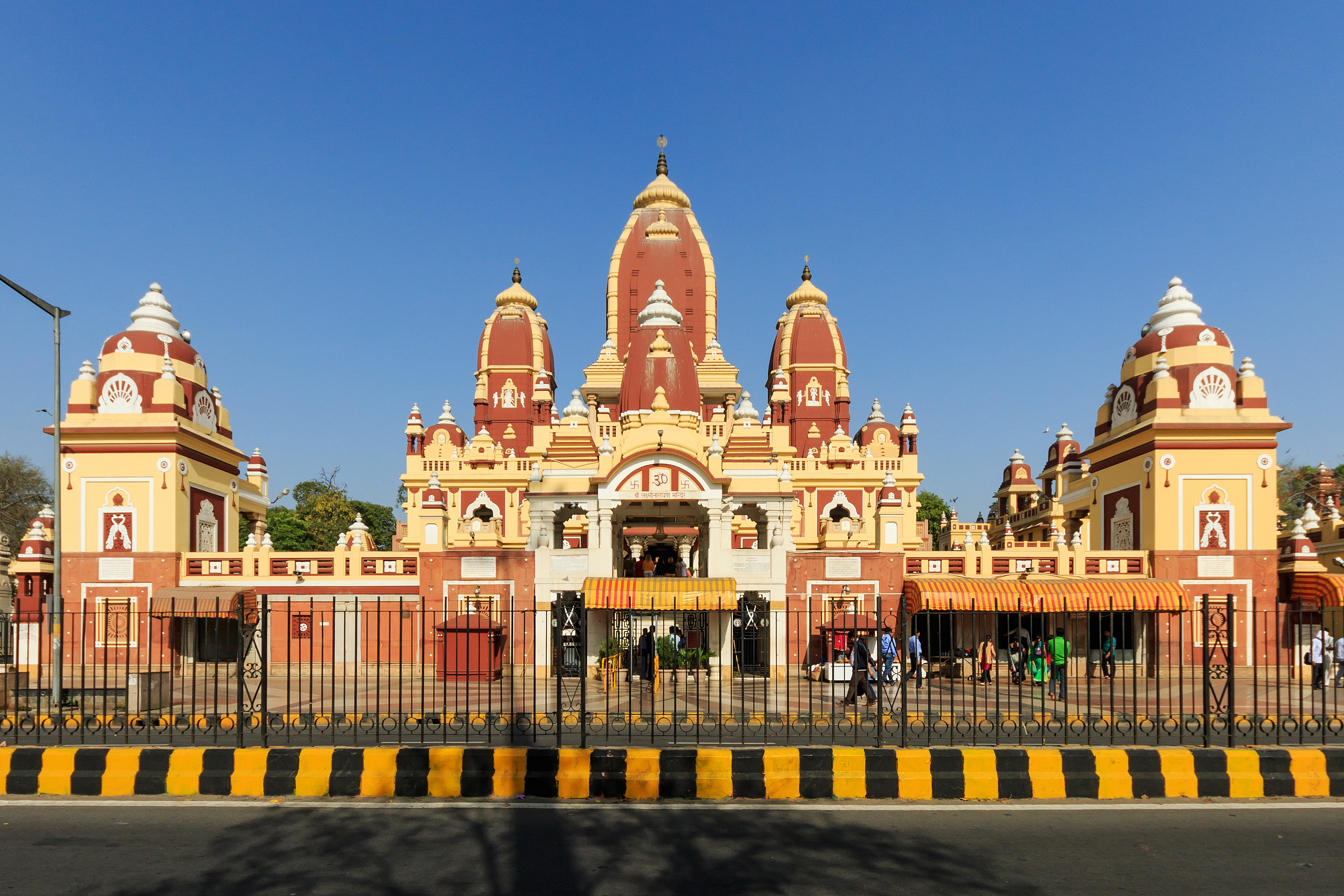
Birla Mandir, New Delhi

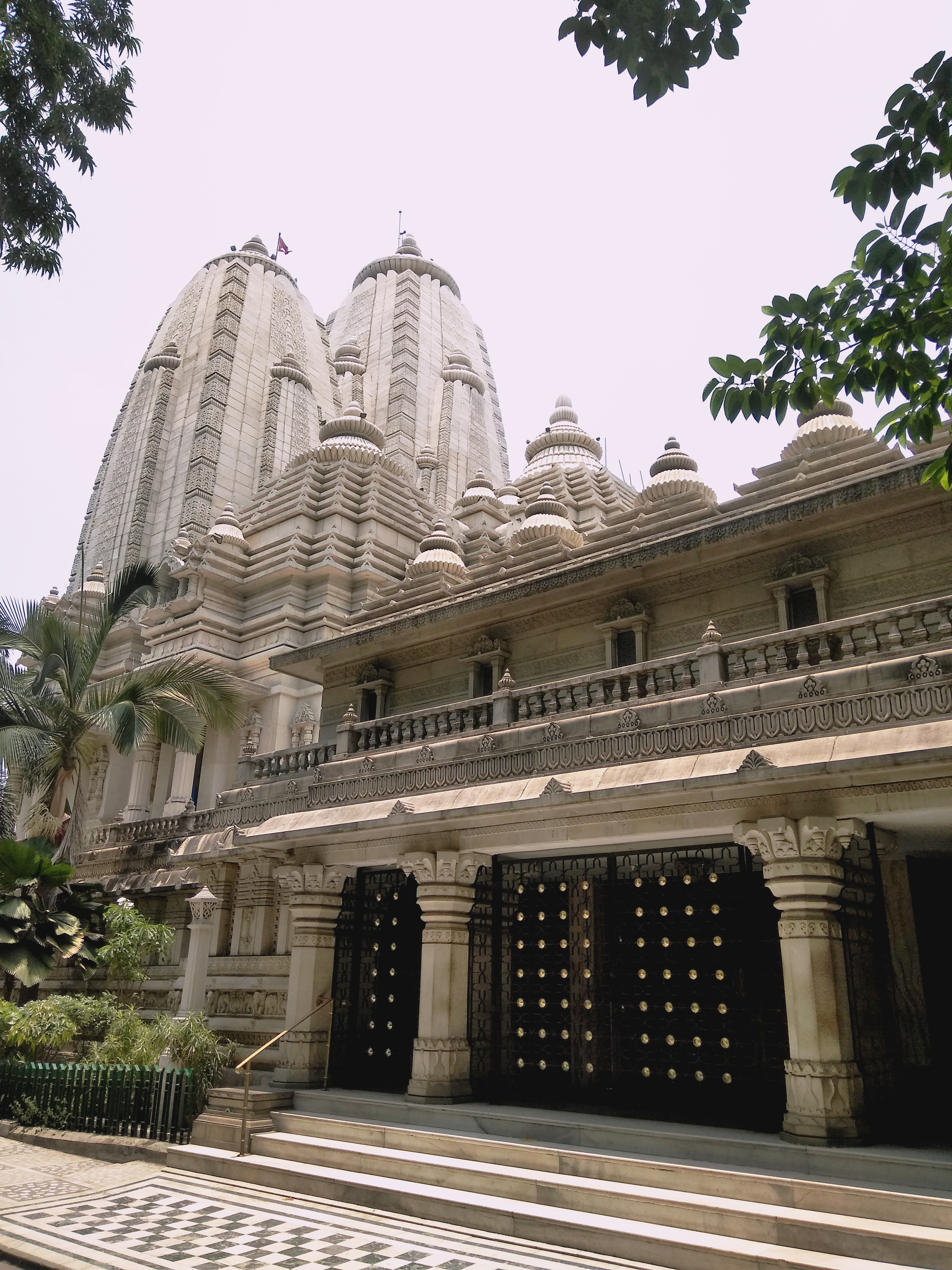
Birla Mandir, Kolkata

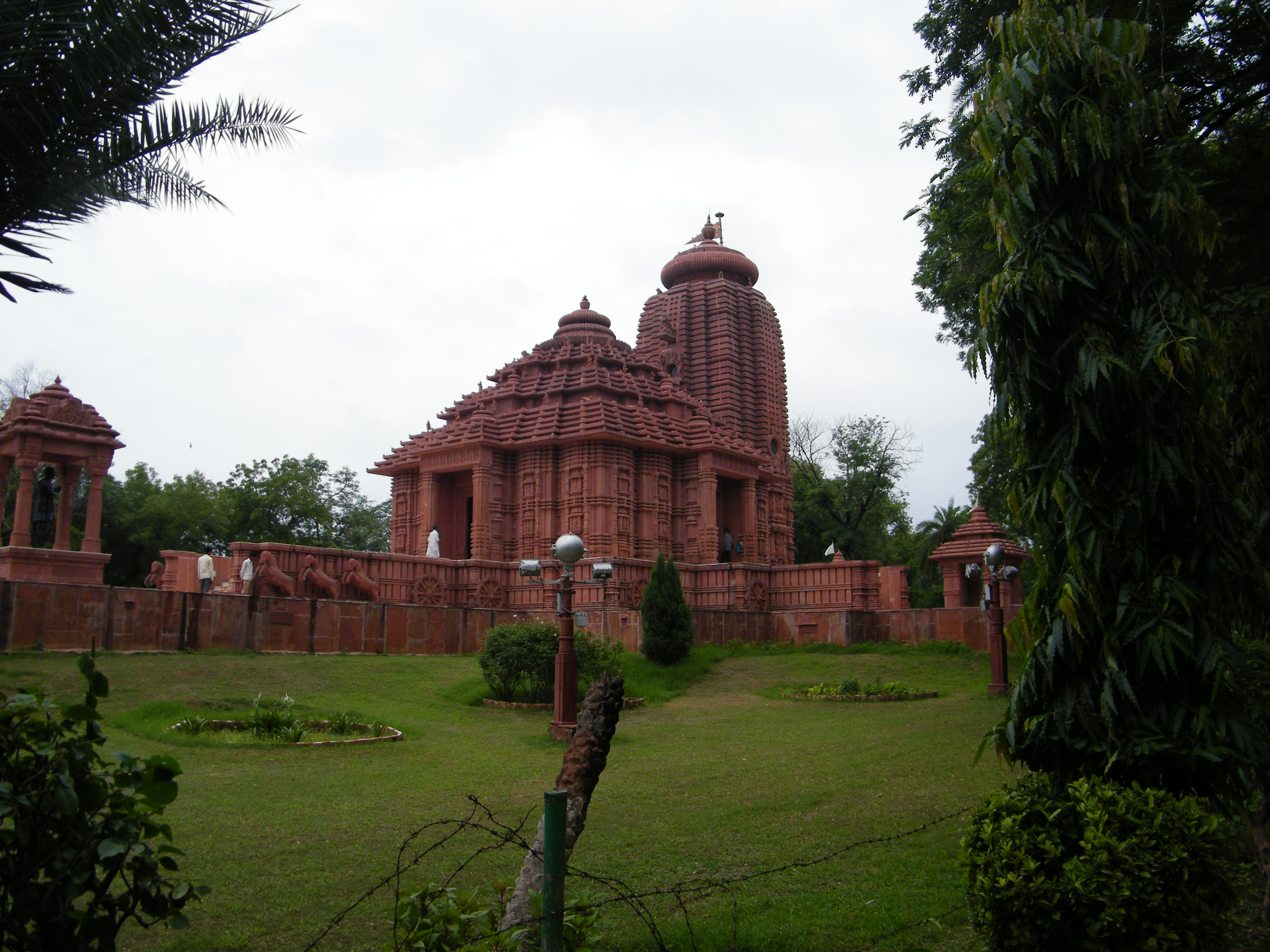
Sun Temple, Gwalior, inspired by the Konark Sun Temple

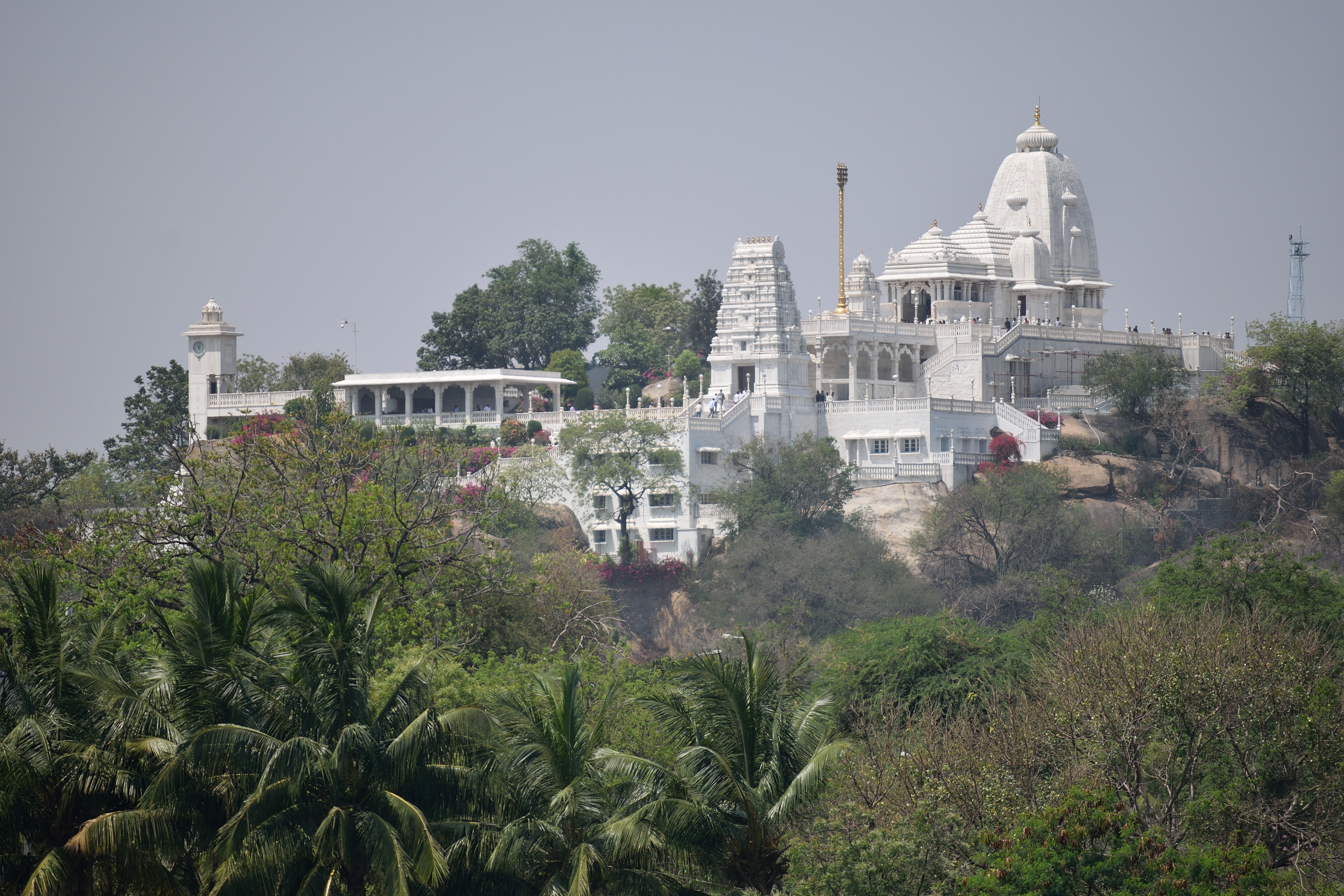
Birla Mandir in Hyderabad

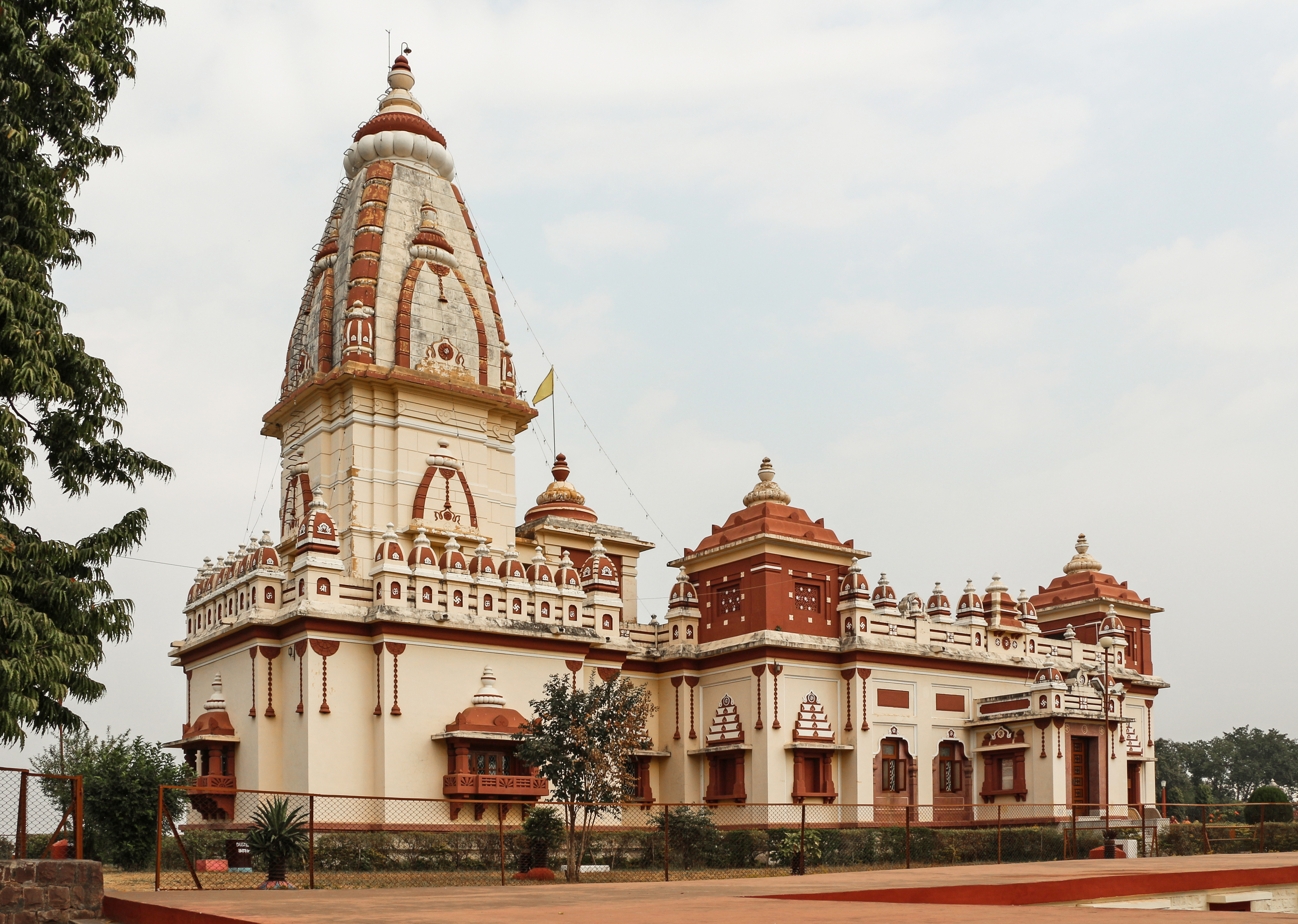
Birla Temple at Arera Hills, Bhopal

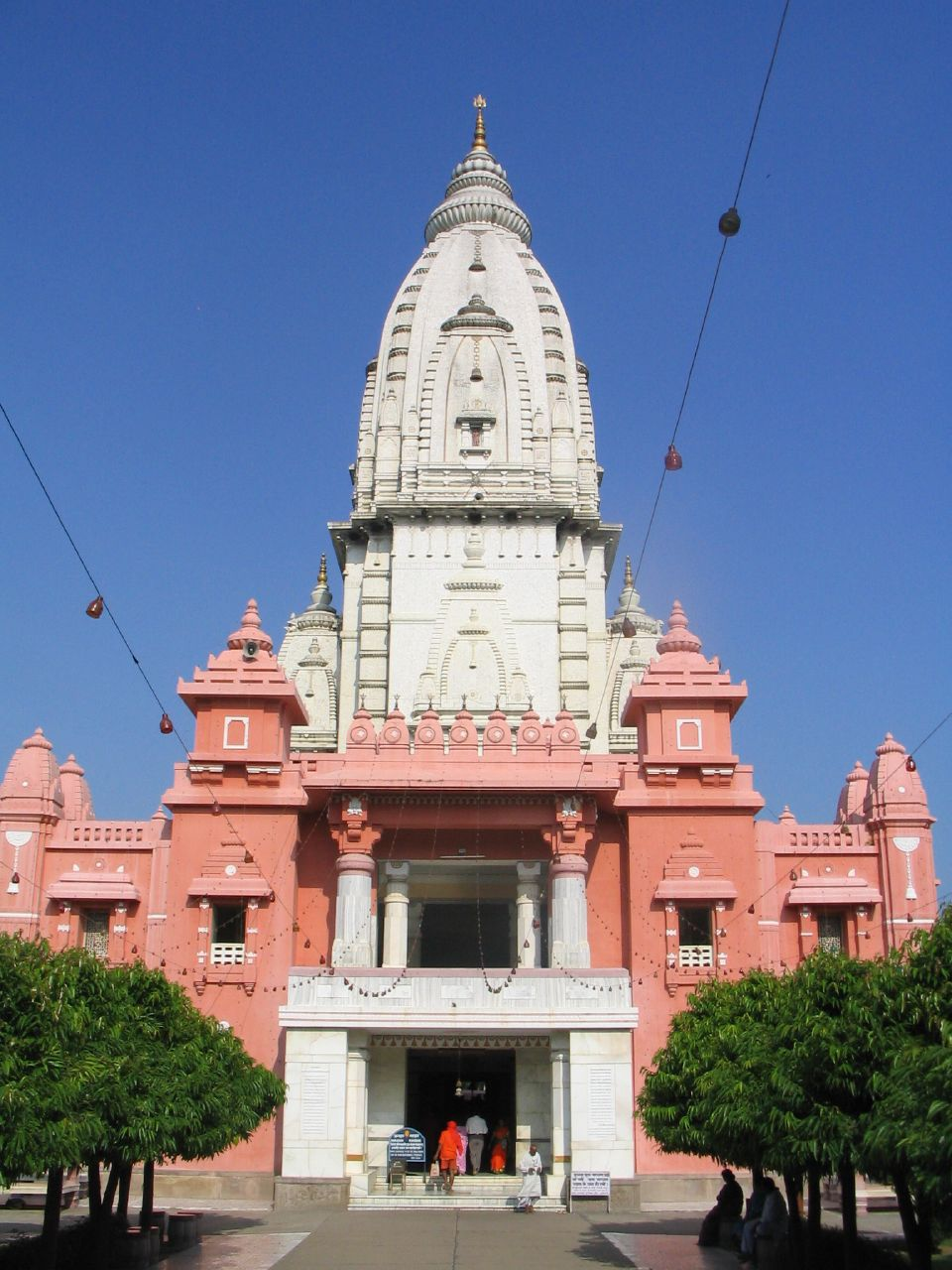
Shri Vishwanath Mandir also known as Birla Mandir in the Banaras Hindu University campus, Varanasi

The Birla Mandirs (Birla Temples) refer to different Hindu temples or Mandirs built by the Birla family in different cities across India. All these temples are magnificently built, some in white marble or sandstone. The temples are generally located in a prominent location, carefully designed to accommodate a large number of visitors. The worship and discourses are well organized. The first one was built in 1939 in Delhi collectively by Jugal Kishore Birla and his brothers and their father. Later temples were built by and managed by different branches of the family. For both of the temples in Varanasi, the Birlas joined other donors to support the cost.

== History and design ==
The Birla temples in Delhi and Bhopal were constructed to fulfill a cultural void in these cities. As these cities were ruled for centuries by Muslim dynasties, these cities did not have any notable temples since the Islamic ruler did not permit the construction of grand Hindu temples with shikharas. Delhi, even though it was the capital of India, did not have any outstanding Hindu temples left. During the Mughal period, temples with a shikhara were prohibited until the late Mughal period. The first temple to be built by the Birla family is the Laxminarayan Temple in Delhi, which was opened in 1939. Located at a prominent site, The temple was designed to be lofty and spacious, suitable for congregational worship or discourses. Although built using modern technology, it very loosely conformed to the Nagara style. The Birlas also built the adjoining Buddhist temple and donated it to the Mahabodhi Society.

The Birla temples in Delhi, Banaras and Bhopal use modern construction materials and techniques. Later temples are built of marble or sandstone and are constructed usually in the classical style of Māru-Gurjara architecture (from the Chandela or Chaulukya dynasty) of the 10-12th century, with some elements of local, regional styles, such as the gopuram of the Birla Mandir, Hyderabad, otherwise in the northern Māru-Gurjara style. The Saraswati temple, in the BITS Pilani campus, is one of the very few Sarasvati temples built in modern times (see Sharda Temple, Maihar). It is said to be a replica of the Kandariya Mahadeva Temple of Khajuraho; however, it is built of white marble and adorned with not only images of Gods but also of philosophers and scientists. The Gwalior Sun temple is a replica (much reduced in size) of the famous Konark Sun Temple, as it would have appeared before the collapse of the main tower. Anne Hardgrove states:

A national chain of the "Birla temples," temples of grandiose scale and design, have become major landmarks and part of the cityscapes of Indian urban life in the late twentieth century. The Birla temples exist in conjunction with other large industrial and philanthropic ventures of the wealthy Birla family, including major institutions of technology, medicine, and education. Birla temples have redefined religion to conform to modern ideals of philanthropy and humanitarianism, combining the worship of a deity with a public institution that contributes to civil society. The architectural forms of the two newest Birla temples (Jaipur and Kolkata) incorporate innovative, dual-purpose structures into the temple design that alter temple practices to reflect the concerns of modern public culture in a religious site.

== Birla Mandirs across India ==
Birla Temples in India
Sl.No.	Image	Temple	Year	Location	Deity
1		Birla Mandir	1931-1966	BHU, Varanasi	Shiva (Shri Vishwanath)
2		Laxminarayan Temple	1939	Delhi	Lakshmi Narayan
3		Buddhist Temple (Delhi Center)	1939	Delhi	Dharmachakra Pravartana Buddha
4		Birla Mandir	1941 - 1961	Kanpur	Lakshmi Narayan
5		Birla Mandir (Gita Mandir)	1946	Mathura	Radha Krishna
6		Birla Mandir	1955	Kurukshetra	Krishna
7		Birla Mandir (Sharda Peeth)	1956-1960	BITS Pilani	Saraswati
8		Birla Mandir	1957	Kurnool	Lakshmi Narayan
9		Lakshmi Narayan Temple, Bhopal	1960	Bhopal	Lakshmi Narayan
10		Birla Mandir	1965	Shahad	Vithoba
11		Renukeshaw Mahadev Temple	1972	Renukoot	Shiva
12		Birla Mandir	1966-1976	Hyderabad	Venkateswara
13		Birla Mandir	1976-1996	Kolkata	Radha Krishna
14		Birla Mandir	1984-1988	Gwalior	Surya
15		Birla Mandir	1988	Jaipur	Lakshmi Narayan
16		Birla Mandir		Patna	Lakshmi Narayan
17		Birla Mandir		Akola	Rama
18		Birla Mandir		Nagda	Vishnu
19		Birla Mandir		Alibaug	Ganesha
20		Birla Mandir		Brajarajnagar	Laxmi Narayanan
21		Birla Mandir		Veraval	Lakshmi Narayan
22		Birla Radha Krishna Mandir	2023	BITS Pilani Goa	Radha Krishna

== See also ==
- Hindu temple architecture
- Shri Vishwanath Mandir
