= Lakshmi Narayan Temple, Agartala =

Hindu temple in Tripura, India

Lakshmi Narayan Temple
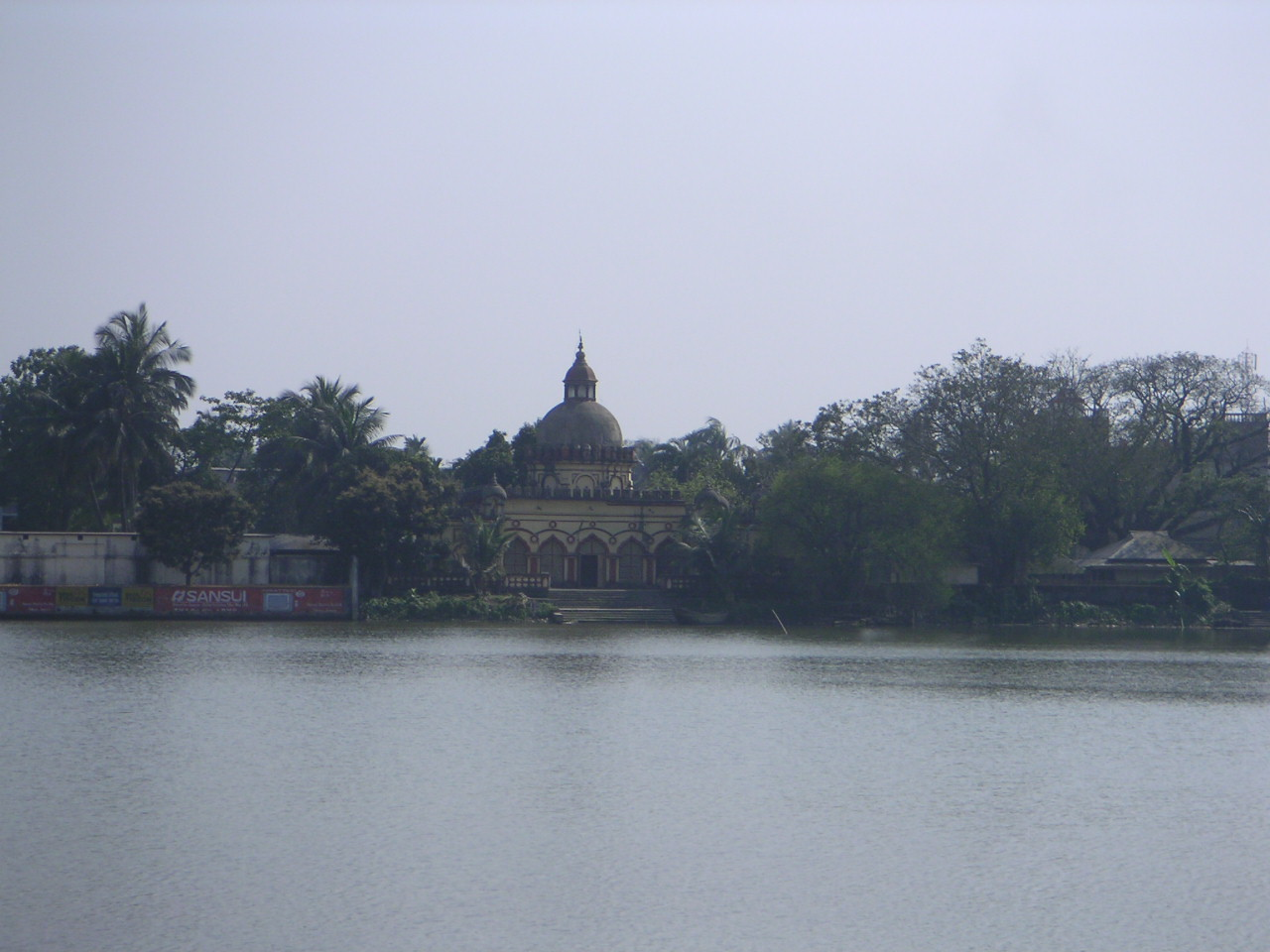

- Location in Tripura Lakshmi Narayan Temple, Agartala (India)

Religion
- Affiliation: Hinduism
- District: West Tripura
- Deity: Lakshmi Narayana
- Festival: Krishna Janmashtami

Location
- Location: Agartala
- State: Tripura
- Country: India
- Interactive map of Lakshmi Narayan Temple
- Coordinates: 23.8342332°N 91.2829037°E

Architecture
- Completed: 1909-1923

Lakshmi Narayan Temple is a Hindu temple, dedicated to the Hindu divine couple Lakshmi Narayana. It is located in the Ujjayanta Palace ground, in the city of Agartala, Tripura state, India. It was founded by the King of Tripura, Birendra Kishore Manikya, during his reign from 1909 to 1923.

== History ==
The temple was constructed by the King of Tripura, Birendra Kishore Manikya (r. 1909–1923), a century ago.

== See also ==
- Hinduism
- Tripura Sundari Temple
- List of Hindu temples in India
