= Birla Radha Krishna Mandir =

Hindu temple in Goa

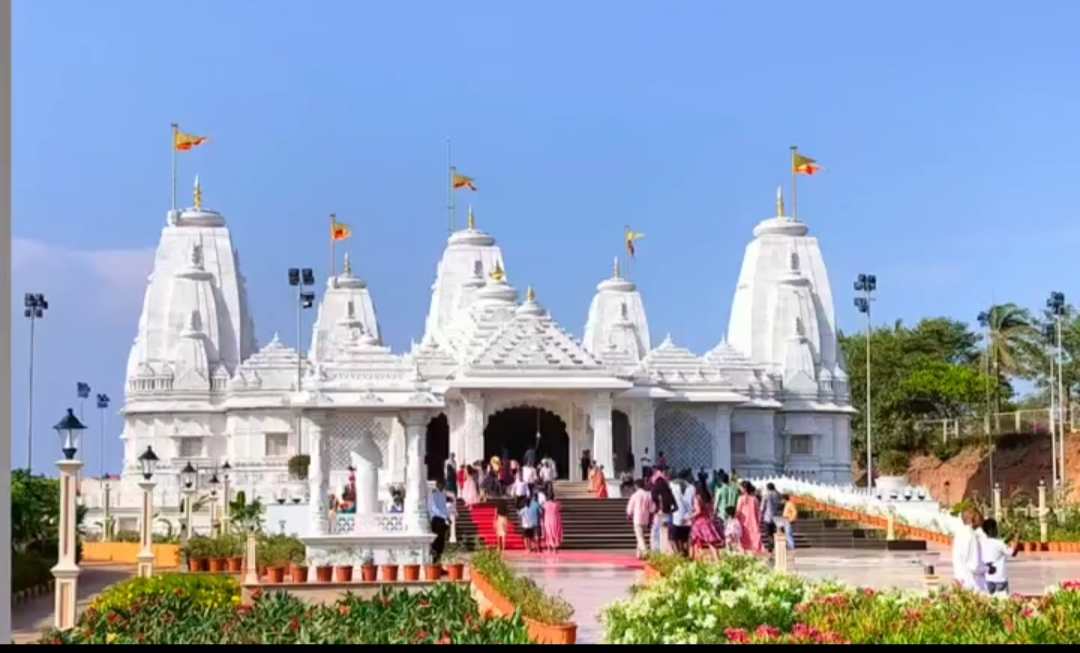

Religion
- Affiliation: Hinduism
- Deity: Radha Krishna

Location
- Location: Goa
- Interactive map of Birla Radha Krishna Mandir
- Coordinates: 15.3872947°N 73.8738767°E

Architecture
- Groundbreaking: 2021
- Completed: 2023

Birla Radha Krishna Mandir is a Hindu temple in Goa.

== Description ==
The temple is among the various temples constructed across India by the Birla family. The foundation stone for the temple was laid in 2021. It was inaugurated in 2023.

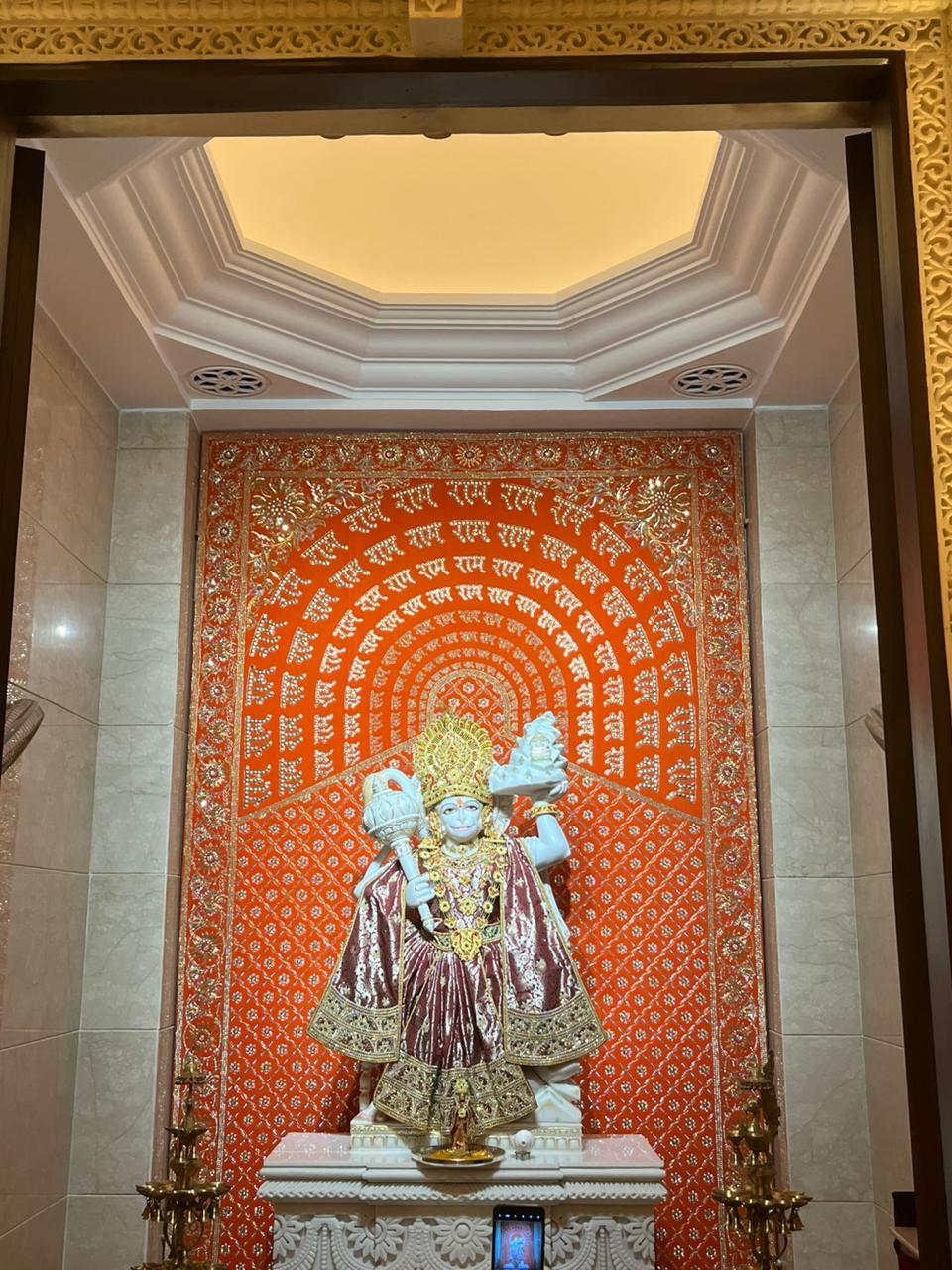
An idol of Hanuman within the temple complex

The temple is located at the campus of BITS Pilani Goa at Sancoale. It is built out of white makrana marble. It is built in a Nagara style, and has five shikharas (temple towers). The main deities worshipped here are the couple Radha Krishna.

The Birla Radha Krishna Mandir in Goa was constructed by the Birla family and inaugurated in 2023. The foundation stone for the temple was laid in 2021, and it was completed in just 22 months with the help of over 1,500 artisans and craftsmen

The temple was inaugurated in May 2023 by Jagadguru Shankaracharya Swami Shri Avimukteshvaranand Saraswati in the presence of Goa Chief Minister Pramod Sawant and members of the Birla family. The temple is part of the various temples constructed across India by the Birla family, known for their deep-rooted spiritual consciousness. It is the latest addition to the over 30 Birla temples across the country, including the iconic Lakshmi Narayan Temple in Delhi and the revered Vishwanathji Temple in Kashi. [https://goa-tourism.co/birla-radha-krishna-mandir/re Read More
