= Birla Mandir, Kolkata =

Hindu temple in Kolkata, India

Birla Mandir
- বিড়লা মন্দির biṛla mondir
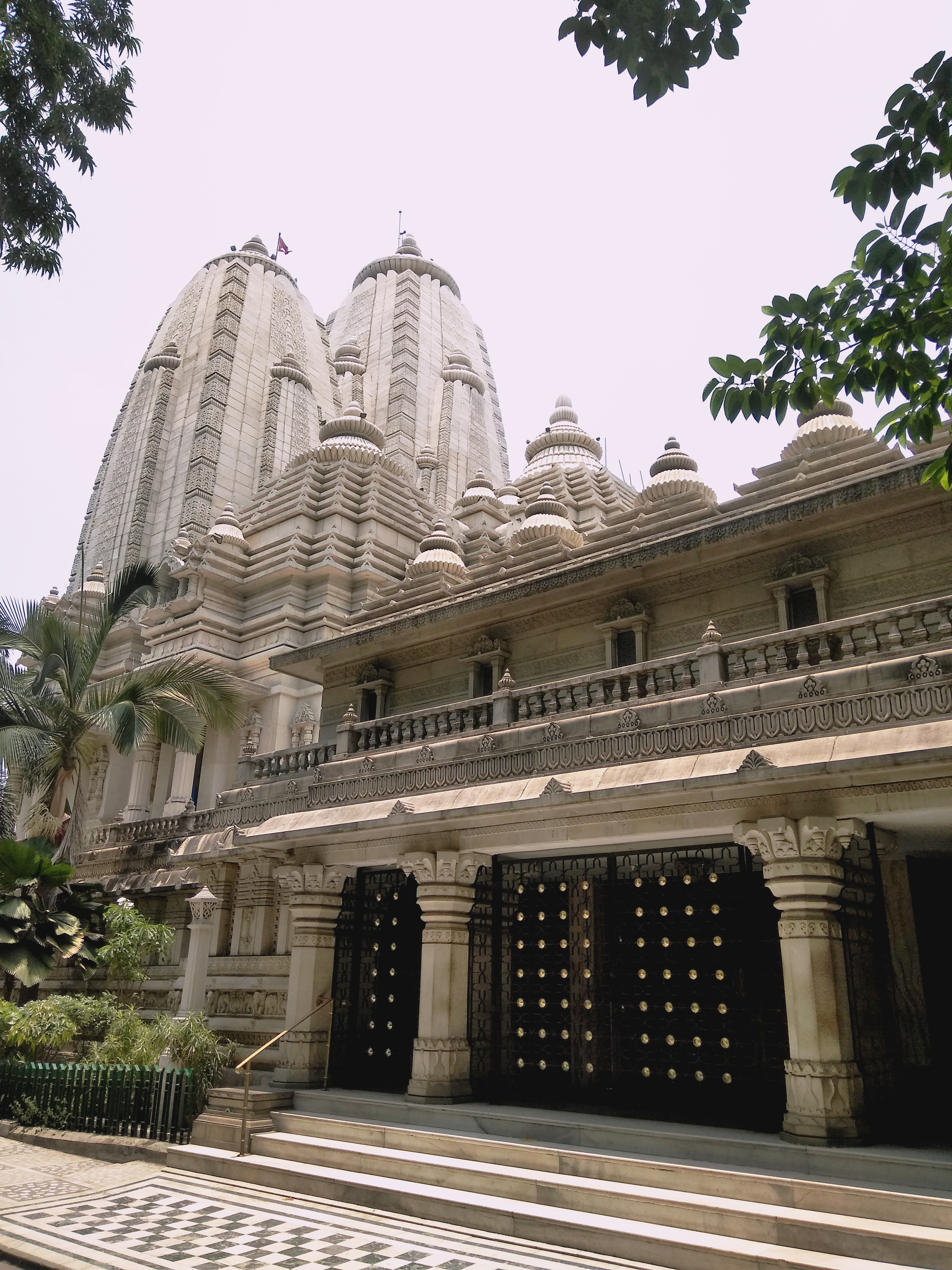

- Location in West Bengal

Religion
- Affiliation: Hinduism
- District: Kolkata
- Deity: Lakshminarayan

Location
- Location: Kolkata
- State: West Bengal
- Country: India
- Interactive map of Birla Mandir
- Coordinates: 22°31′50″N 88°21′54″E

Architecture
- Type: Mandir
- Completed: 1970–1996

Birla Mandir in Ward Number 69, Kolkata, India, is a Hindu temple on Asutosh Chowdhury Avenue, Ballygunge, built by the industrialist Birla family. It is dedicated to Vishnu avatars such as Rama and Krishna. This temple is open in the morning from 5.30 A.M. to 11 A.M. and in the evening from 4 .30 P.M. to 9 P.M. On Janmashtami, the birthday of Krishna, devotees come from far away places to pay their respect to the deities.

== History ==
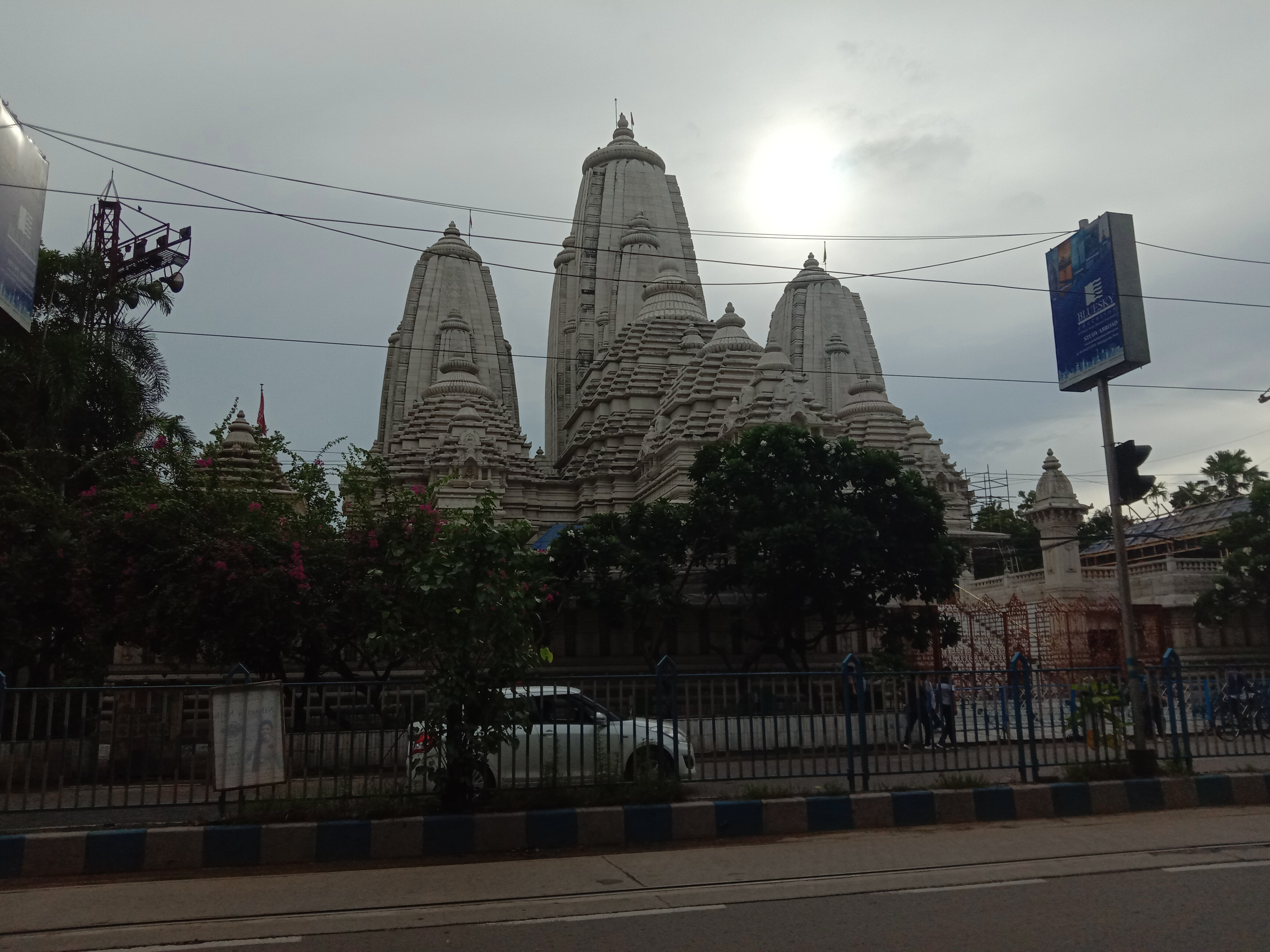
Birla Mandir in Ballygunge, in afternoon, July 2022.

The construction of the temple began in 1970. It took 26 years to complete the entire structure. The construction was supervised by the Sompuras.

On Wednesday, the 21st of February, 1996, the Pran Prathistha was done by Swami Chidanandaji Maharaj in the morning. Dr. Karan Singh inaugurated the temple the same day.

== Location ==
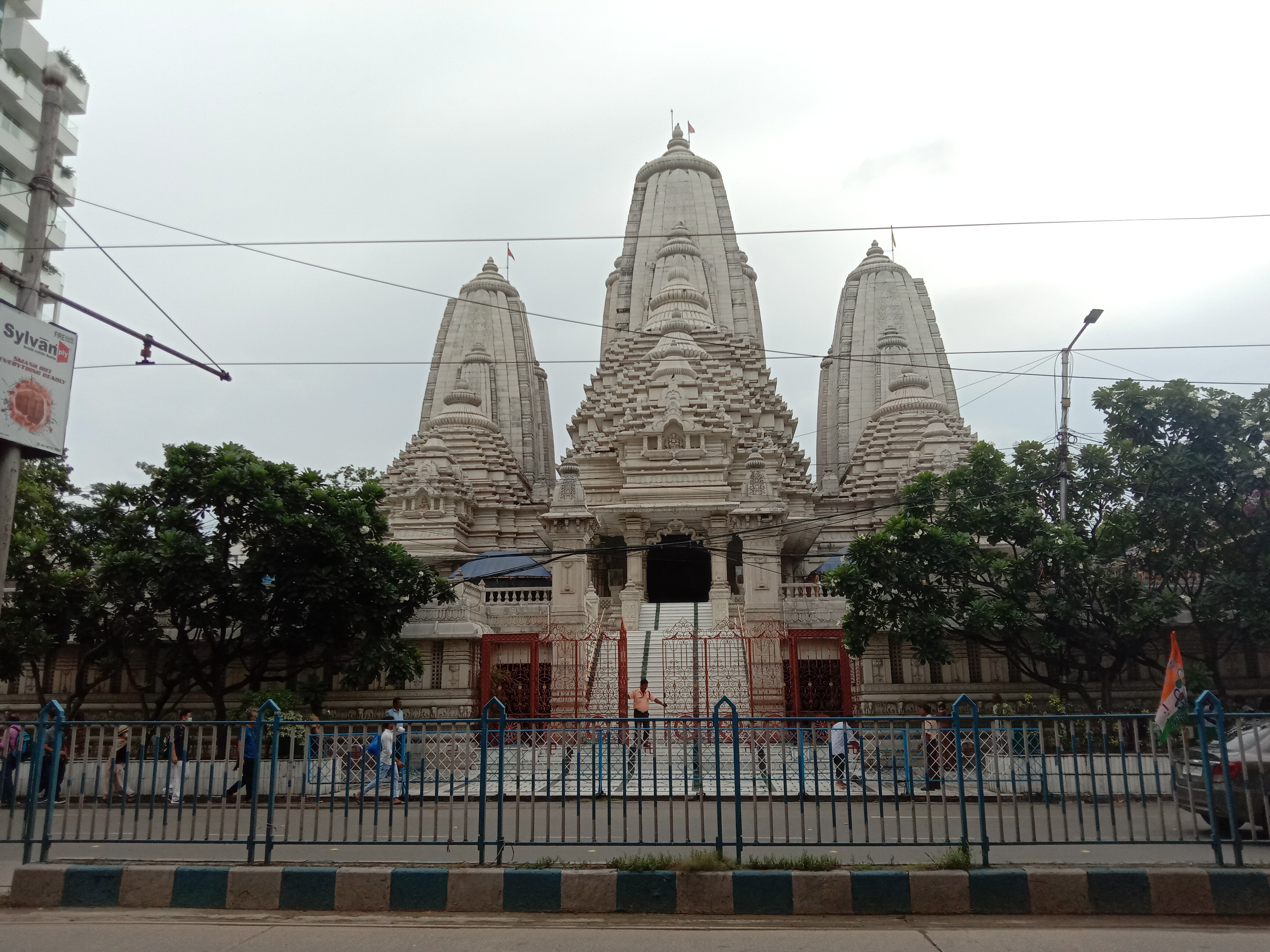
Birla Mandir in Ballygunge, July 2022.

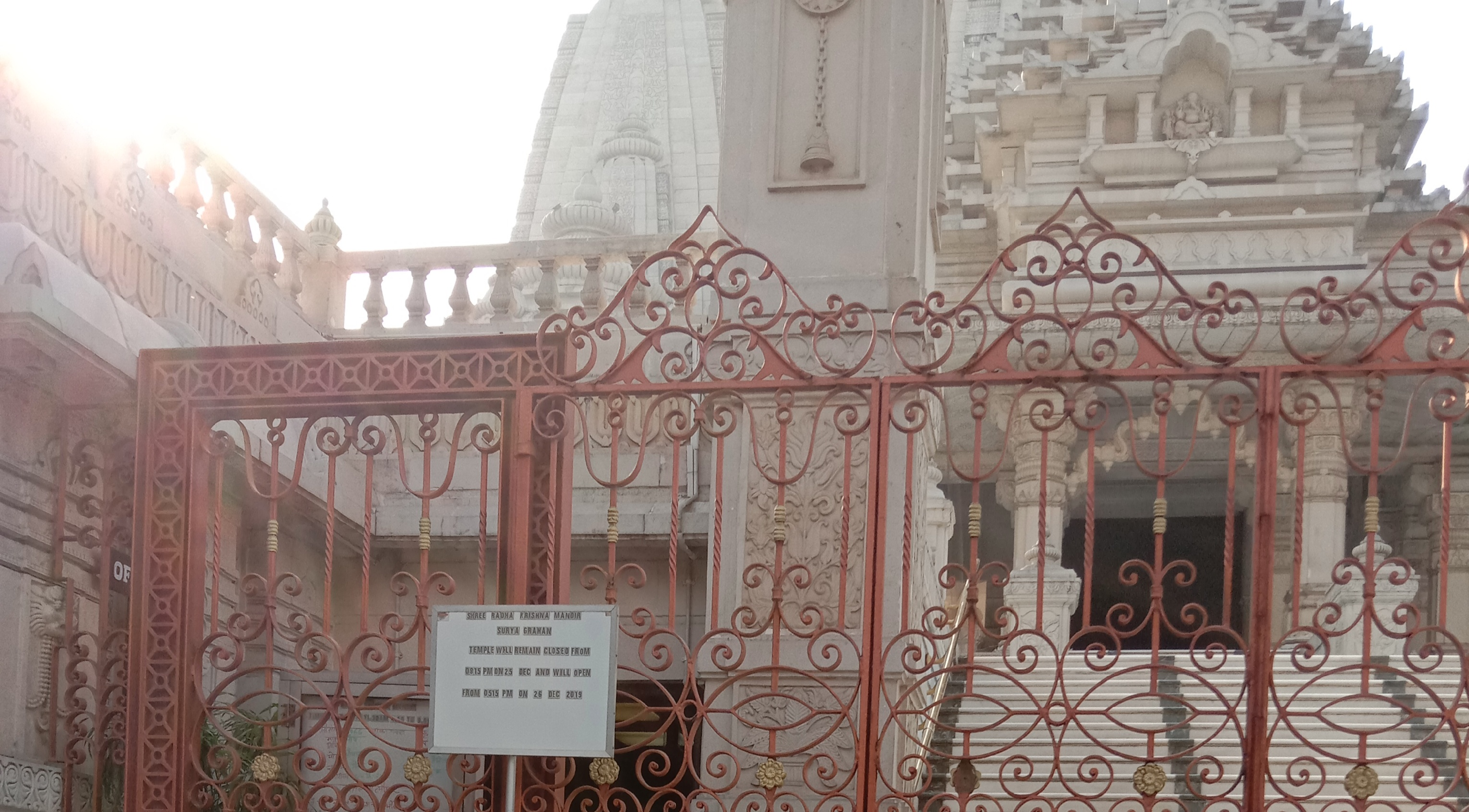
Temple entrance at AC Avenue in Ballygunge

Birla Temple is located on Ashutosh Choudhury Avenue, Ballygunge, kolkata. It is also known as Laxminarayan Mandir. Nearest metro station of Birla Mandir are Jatin Das Park and VIP Bazar (under construction). It is 16 km from Dumdum/Kolkata Airport, 5 km from Sealdah railway station and apart from these; buses, trams, taxies etc. are also available.

== Temple ==
- The main temple houses statues of deities Krishna and Radha.
- The left side temple shikhar (dome) houses goddess Durga, the Hindu goddess of Shakti, the power.
- The right side dome of the temple houses Shiva in meditation mode.
- Spread on 44 kathas of land, this temple built of white marble bears resemblance to the renowned Lingaraj Temple of Bhubaneswar. Birla Mandir also showcases pictorial depiction of scriptures of Bhagavad Gita in its stone engravings and some intricate Rajasthani temple architecture. Designed by the architect Nomi Bose.

== See also ==
- Places of interest in Kolkata
