= Birla Mandir, Hyderabad =

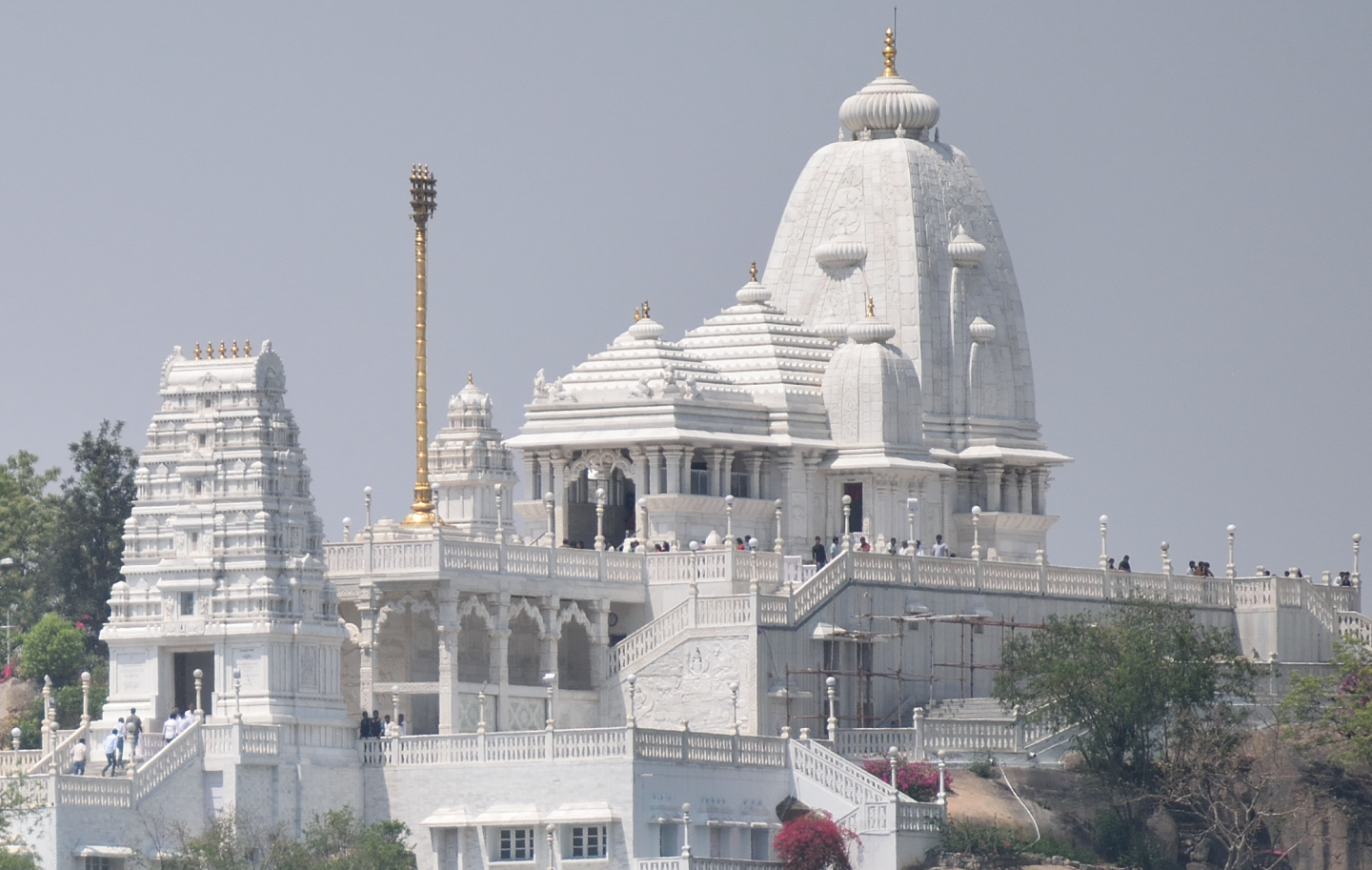

- Location within Hyderabad Location within Telangana Location within India

Religion
- Affiliation: Hinduism
- Deity: Lord Venkateswara

Location
- Location: Naubat Pahad
- State: Telangana
- Country: India
- Coordinates: 17.4061875°N 78.4690625°E

Architecture
- Completed: 1976; 50 years ago

Birla Mandir is a Hindu temple built on a 280 feet (85 m) high hillock called Naubath Pahad 13 acres (53,000 m^{2}) plot in Hyderabad, Telangana, India. Naubat Pahad which was once also known as Band Rock so called because long ago all official communications from Mughals to the Nizams were proclaimed from this hill accompanied by music.

The construction took ten years and was opened in 1976 by Swami Ranganathananda of Ramakrishna Mission. The temple was constructed by the Birla Foundation, which has also constructed several similar temples across India, all known as Birla Mandir.

== Architecture ==
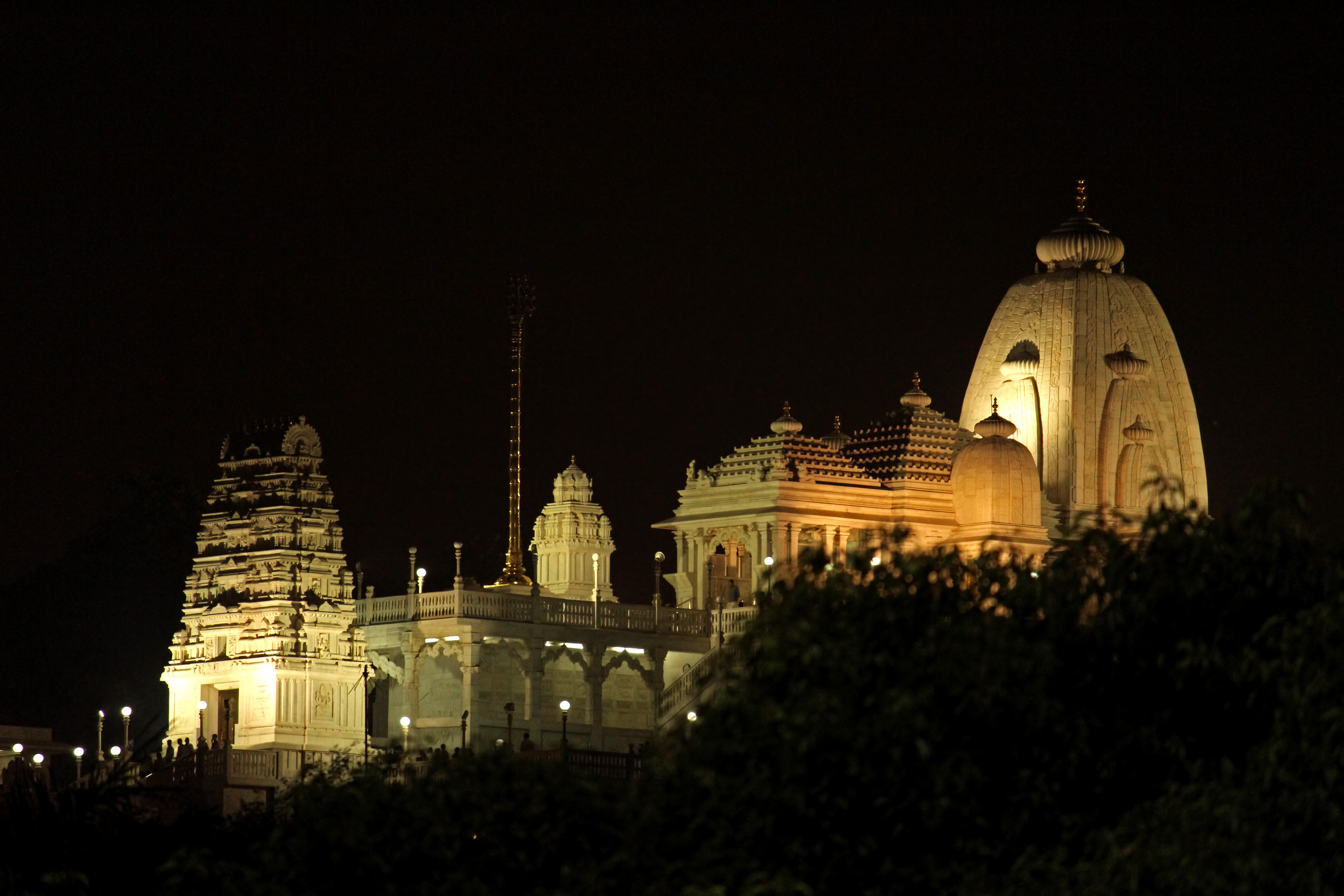
Birla Mandir at night

The architecture of the temple represents a blend of Dravidian, Rajasthani, Gujarati and Utkala architectural styles. It was constructed using 2,000 tons of white Makrana marble. The granite idol of presiding deity Lord Venkateswara is about 11 ft (3.4 m) tall, and a carved lotus forms an umbrella on the top. A brass flagstaff in the temple premises rises to a height of 42 ft. (13 m). The temple does not have traditional bells, as Swami Ranganathananda wished that the temple atmosphere should be conducive to meditation.

== About the temple ==
Apart from the main shrine, the consorts of Lord Venkateswara, Padmavati and Andal are housed in separate shrines. The temple also has separate shrines for various Deva and Devi, including Shiva, Shakti, Ganesh, Hanuman, Brahma, Saraswati and Lakshmi. Selected teachings of men and Gurbani are engraved on temple walls. Birla temples are open to all, as identified by Mahatma Gandhi and other Hindu leaders.

== Transport ==
Birla Mandir is near Lakdi-ka-pul and Assembly Hyderabad metro station. Birla Mandir is well connected by TSRTC buses and MMTS. The nearest MMTS station is Lakdi ka pul.

Bus No: 5K,5S,5 From Secunderabad to Mehdipatnam any bus no. 113 from Uppal to Mehdipatnam.

== Parking ==
Due to its immense popularity, the temple's car parking facilities are often full, leading to a parking shortage near the temple. To avoid parking hassles, local travel guides advise parking cars at the foot of Naubat Pahad near the Assembly and reaching Birla Mandir on foot over a 2-minute walk. '

== Gallery ==
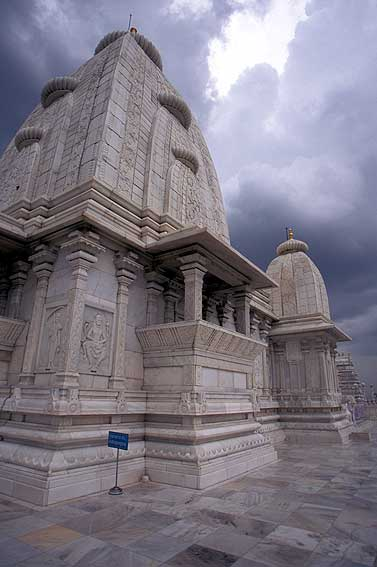
Main Building of Temple

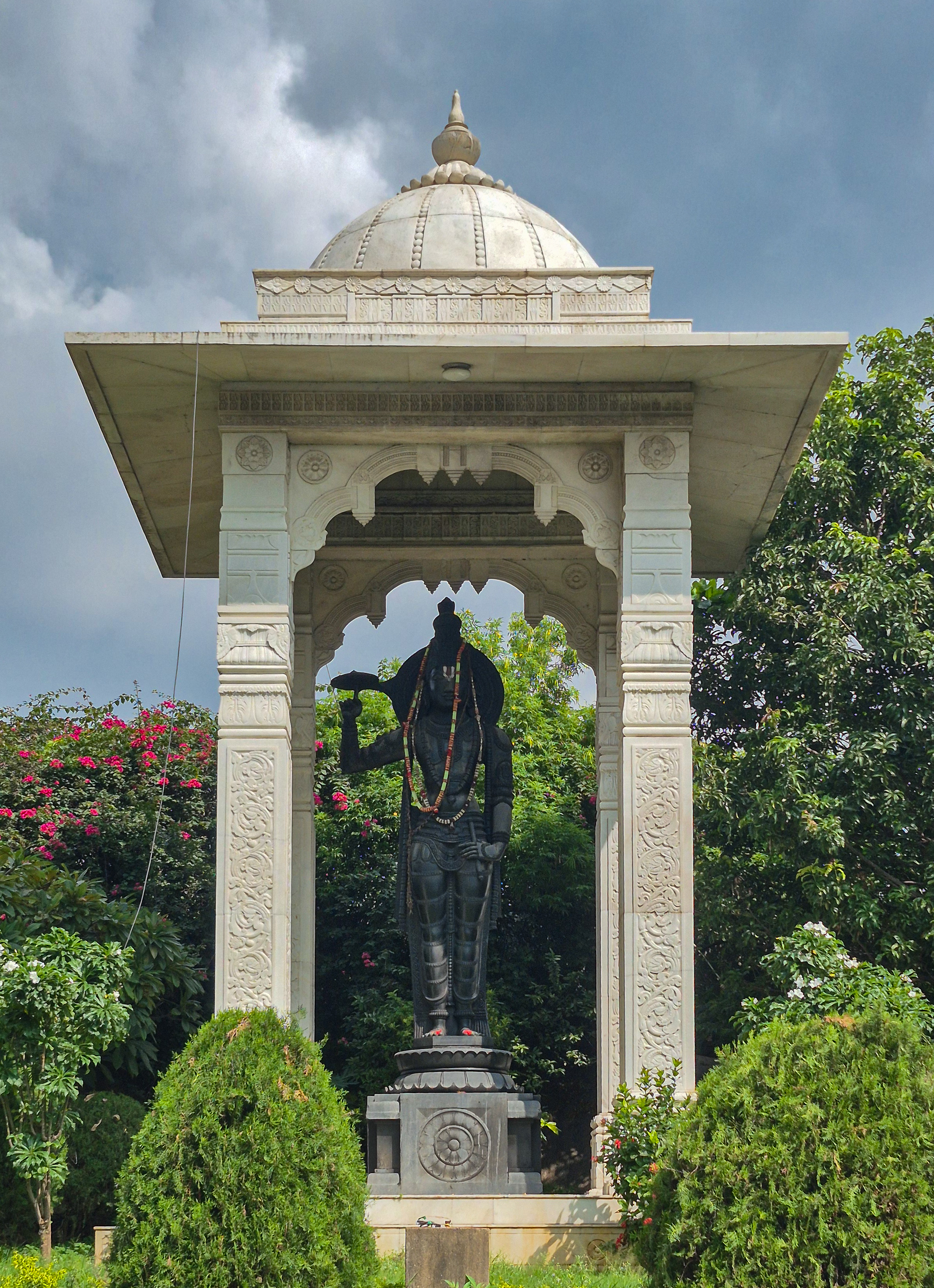
Statue at Birla Mandir
