= Laxminarayan Temple =

Hindu temple in India

- Laxmi Narayan Temple
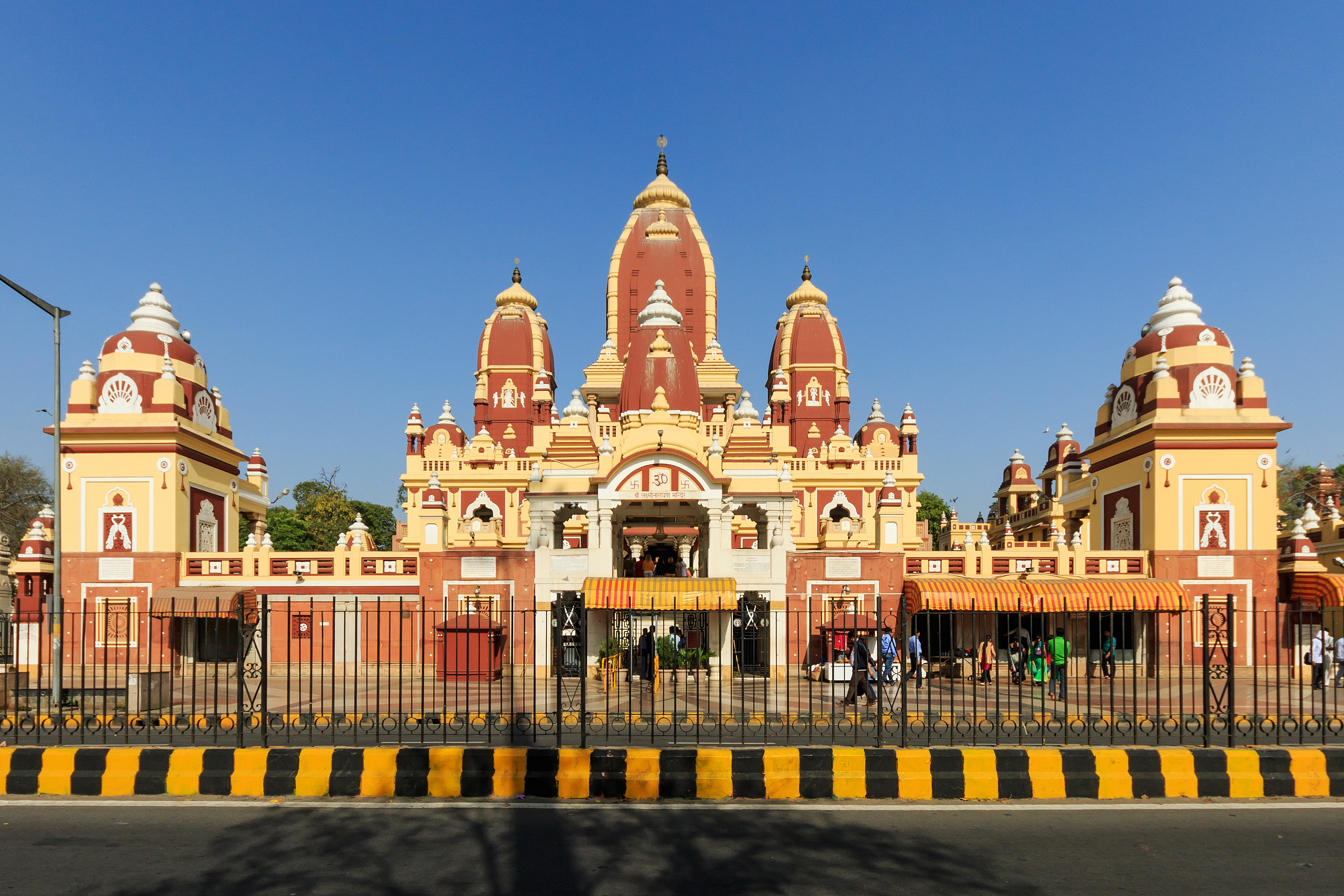
- Laxminarayan Temple

- Location in Delhi

Religion
- Affiliation: Hinduism
- Deity: Laxmi Narayan
- Festivals: Janmashtami, Diwali

Location
- Location: New Delhi
- Country: India
- Coordinates: 28°37′58″N 77°11′56″E

Architecture
- Type: Nagara style of Hindu temple architecture
- Creator: Baldeo Das Birla
- Completed: 1939

Laxminarayan Temple, commonly known as Birla Mandir, is a Hindu temple in New Delhi, India. Dedicated to Lakshmi and Vishnu in the dual representation of Lakshmi Narayana, it was built by the industrialist Jugal Kishore Birla between 1933 and 1939 and inaugurated by Mahatma Gandhi. Gandhi agreed to inaugurate the temple on the condition that it would be open to people of all castes. The temple is built in the Orissan architectural style and was the first large Hindu temple built in Delhi in the 20th century colonial era.

The temple complex covers about 3 hectares (7.5 acres) and includes shrines dedicated to Shiva, Ganesha, Hanuman and Buddha, as well as fountains, gardens and a Geeta Bhawan, a hall used for religious discourses. It is one of Delhi's major Hindu temples and attracts large numbers of devotees during Janmashtami and Diwali.

== History ==
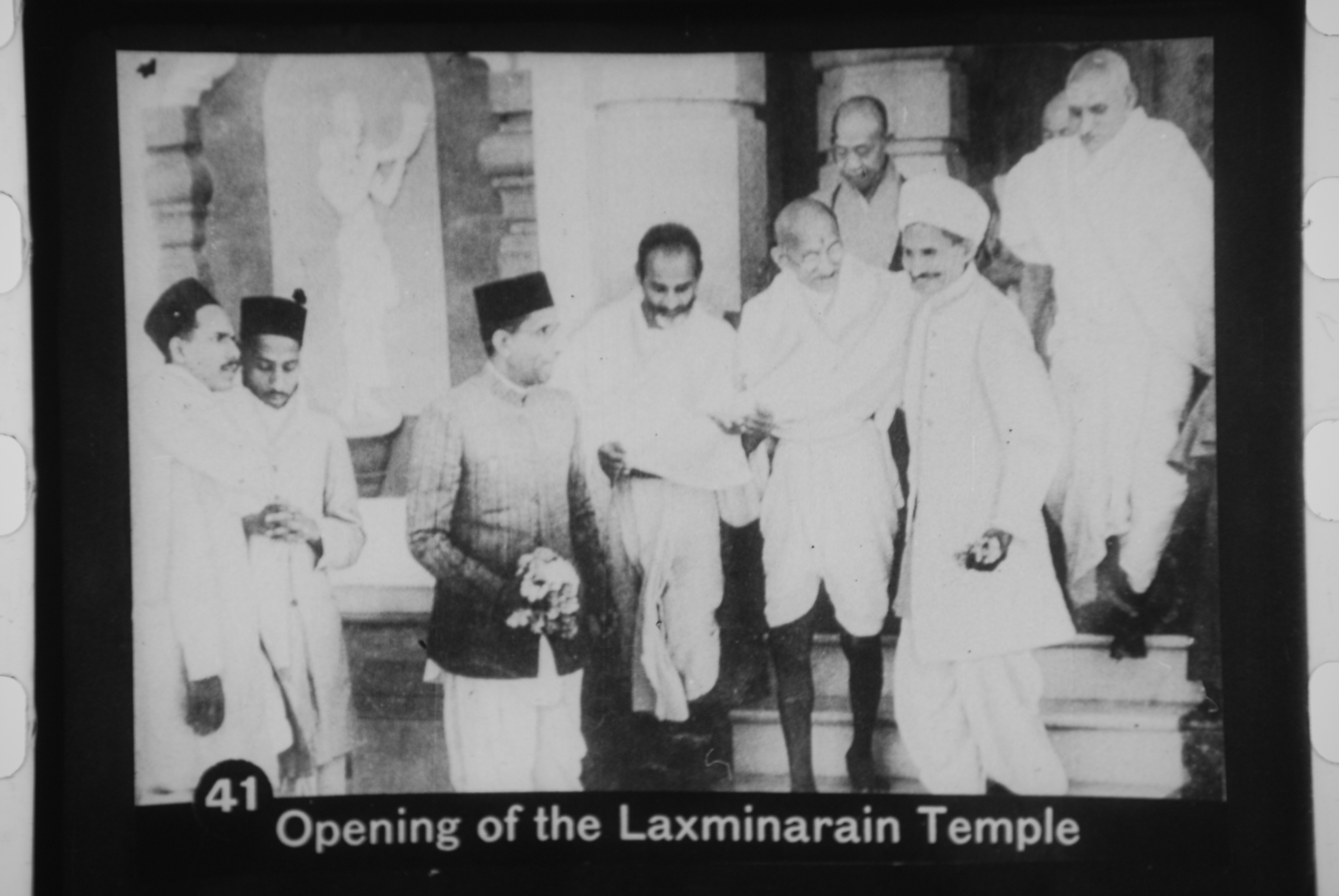
Gandhi inaugurating the Laxminarayan Temple with members of the Birla family, Delhi, 1938

The construction of the temple dedicated to Laxmi Narayana started in 1933, built by industrialist and philanthropist, Baldeo Das Birla and his son Jugal Kishore Birla of the Birla family, thus, the temple is also known as Birla Temple. The foundation stone of the temple was laid by Jat Maharaj Udaybhanu Singh. The temple was built under guidance of Pandit Vishwanath Shastri. The concluding ceremony and Yagna were performed by Swami Keshavanandji.

Gandhi inaugurated the temple and ensured that it allows members of all castes.

This is the first of a series of temples built by the Birlas in many cities of India, which are also often called Birla Temple.

== Architecture ==
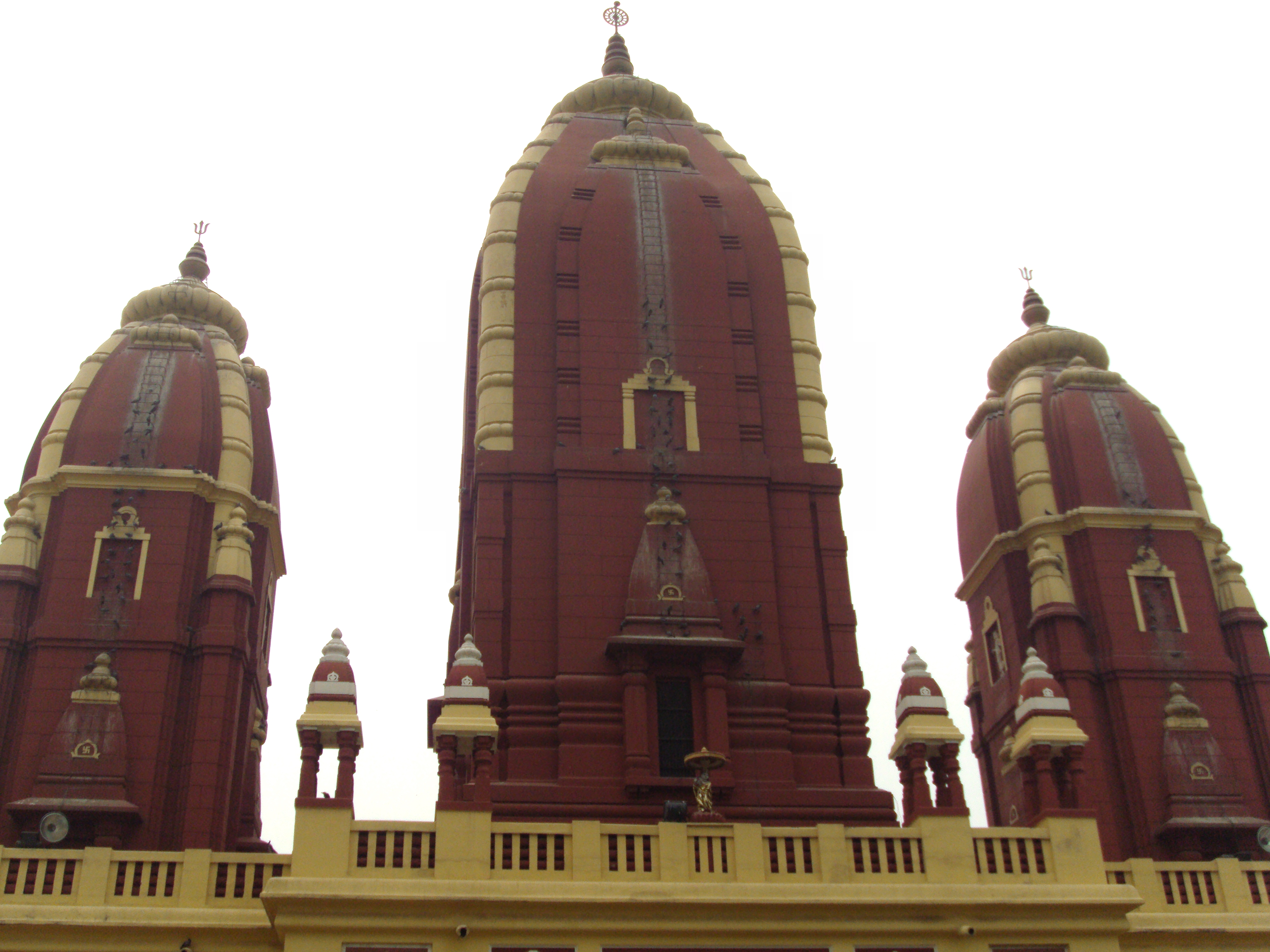
The shikharas of the temple

Its architect was Sris Chandra Chatterjee, a leading proponent of the "Modern Indian Architecture Movement." The architecture was influenced heavily by the principles of the Swadeshi movement of the early twentieth century and the canonical texts used. The movement did not reject the incorporation of new construction ideas and technologies. Chatterjee extensively used modern materials in his buildings.

The three-storied temple is built in the northern or Nagara style of temple architecture. The entire temple is adorned with carvings depicting the scenes from golden yuga of the present universe cycle. More than a hundred skilled artisans from Benares, headed by Acharya Vishvanath Shastri, carved the icons of the temple. The highest shikhara of the temple above the sanctum sanctorum is about 49 m (160 feet) high. The temple faces the east and is situated on a high plinth. The shrine is adorned with fresco paintings depicting Shastri's life and work. The icons of the temple are in marble brought from Jaipur. Kota stone from Makarana, Agra, Kota, and Jaisalmer was used in the construction of the temple premises. The Geeta Bhawan to the north of the temple is dedicated to Krishna. There is an rtificial landscape and cascading waterfalls.

== Temple ==
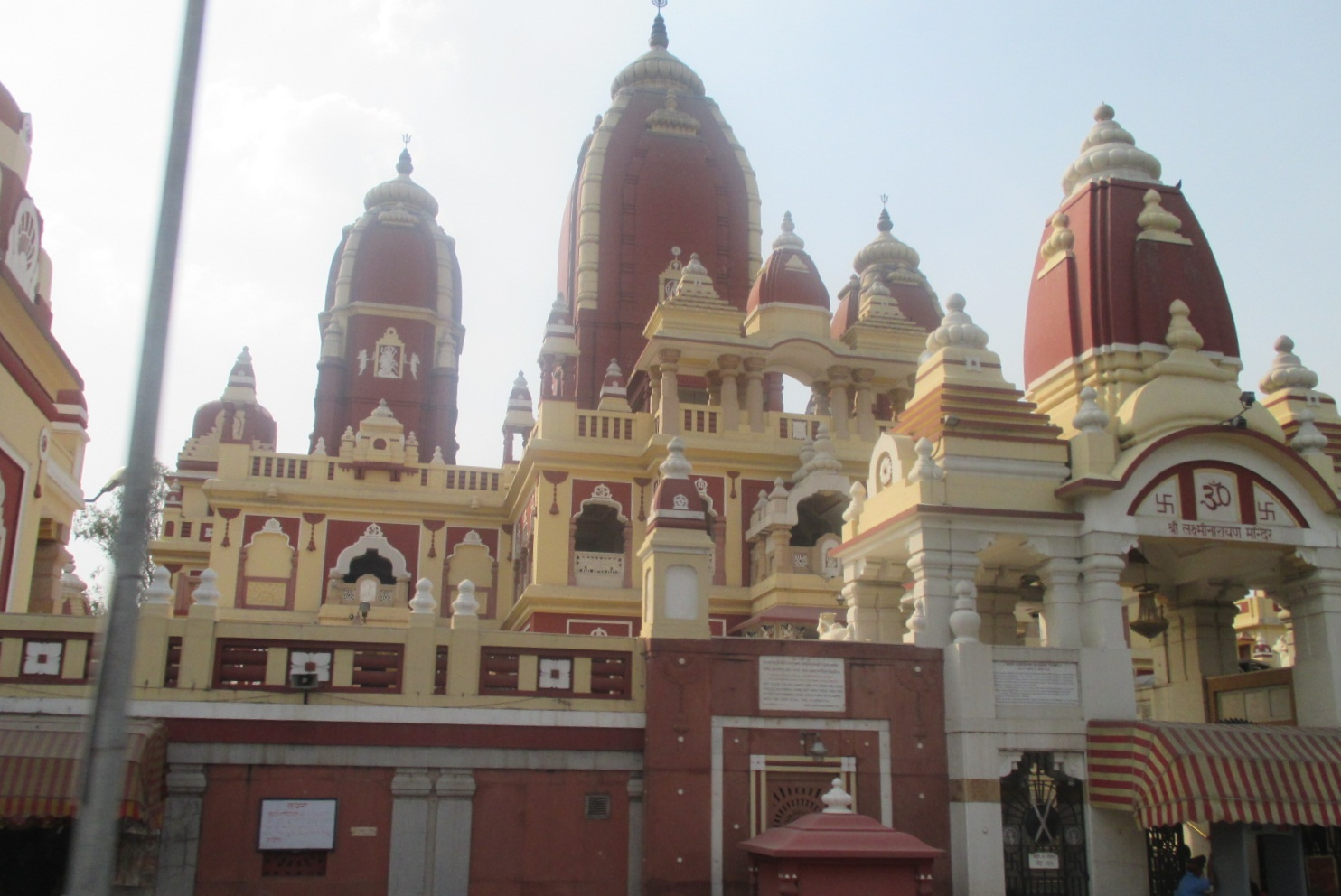
Birla Mandir in 2013

The main temple houses statues of Narayan and Lakshmi. There are other small shrines dedicated to Shiva, Ganesha and Hanuman. There is also a shrine dedicated to Buddha. The left side temple shikhar (dome) houses Devi Durga, the Hindu goddess of Shakti, the power. The temple is spread over an area of 30,000 square metres (7.5 acres) approximately and the built up area is 2,100 square metres (0.52 acres).

== Location ==
The temple is situated at Gole Market, Mandir Marg, New Delhi. It is located west of Connaught Place. The nearest metro station to reach temple is RK Ashram Marg Metro Station, situated approximately 1.5 km away. Alternatively, Shivaji Station Metro Station is located around 1.8 km from the complex. Admission to the complex is free, and it is open daily to visitors from 04:30 AM to 1.30 PM and from 2:30 PM to 9:00 PM.

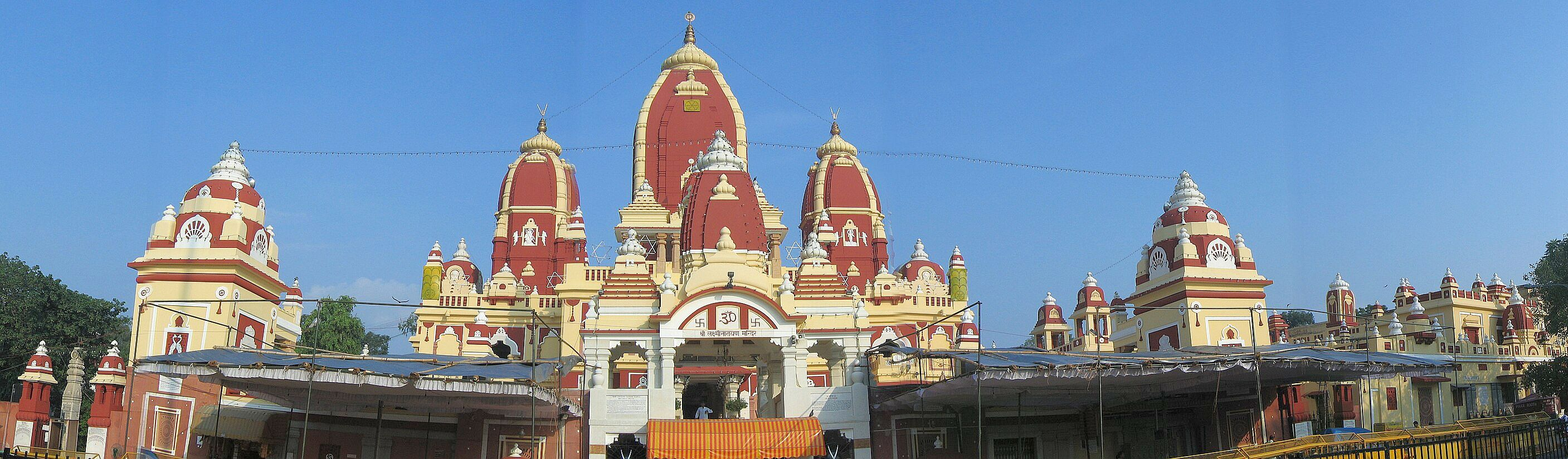
Panoramic view of Birla Mandir

== See also ==
- Tourist attractions in Delhi

== Gallery ==
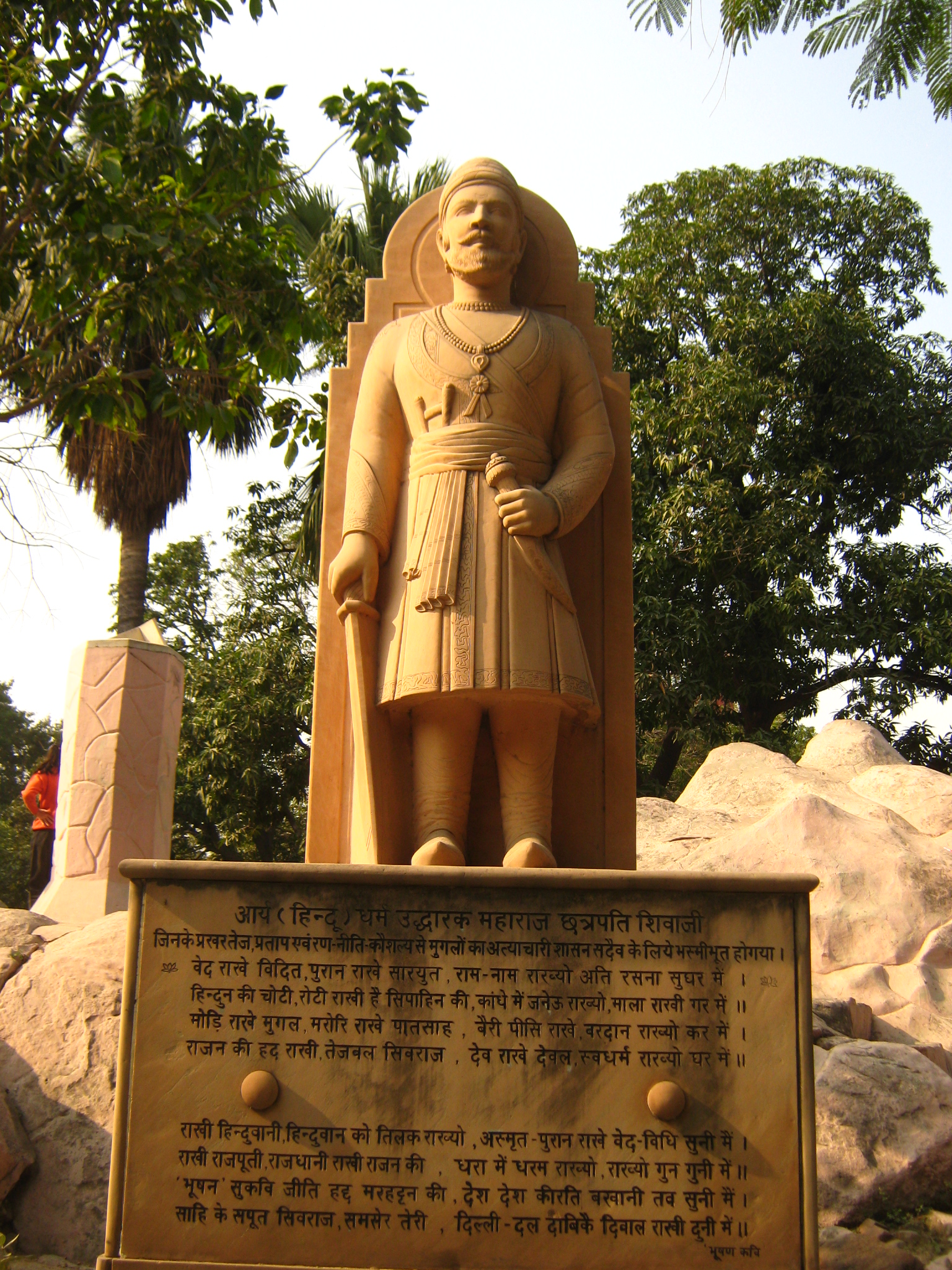
Shivaji statue with a verse by Poet Bhushan

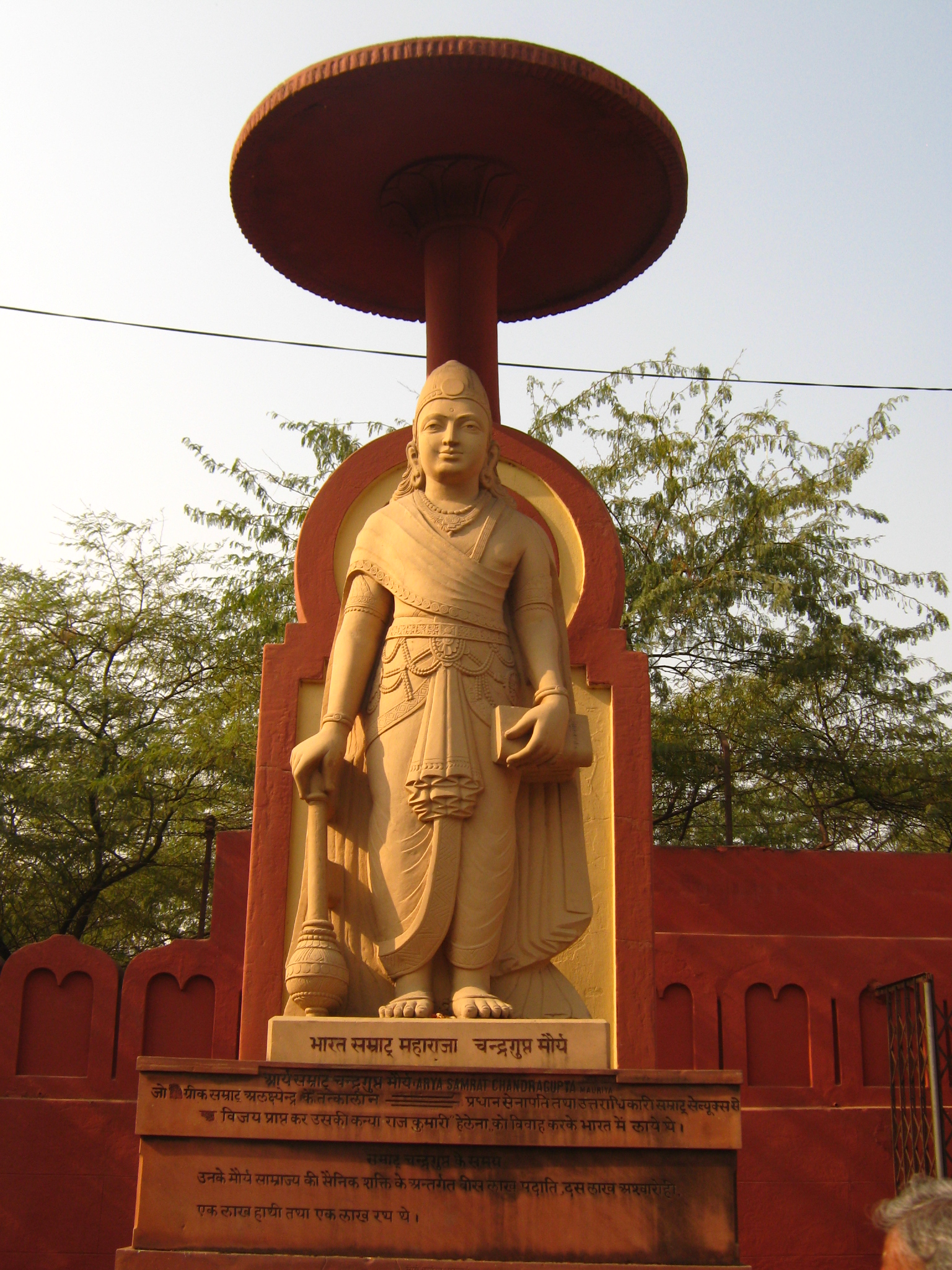
Chandragupta Maurya

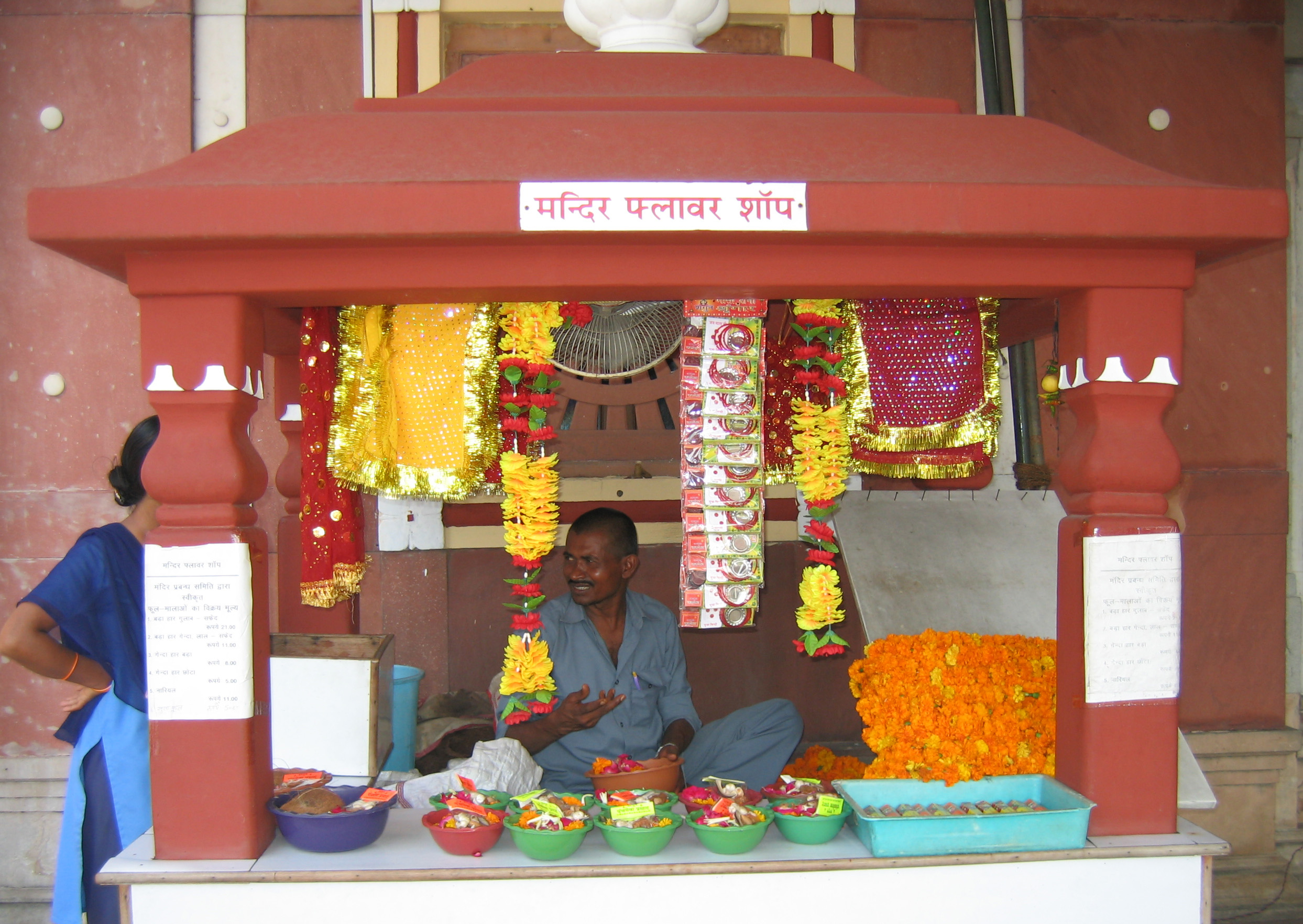
Flower Shop

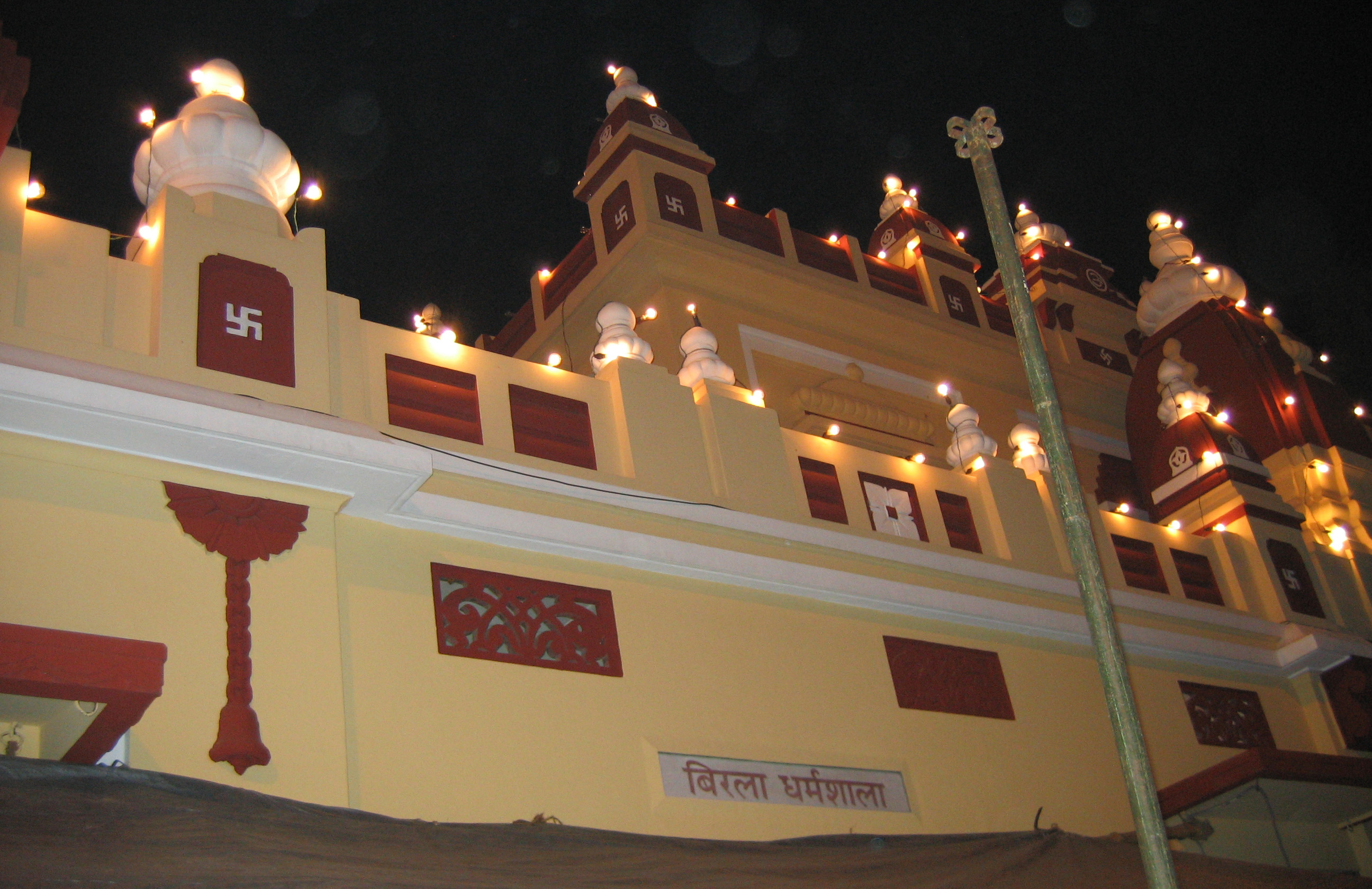
Dharmashala

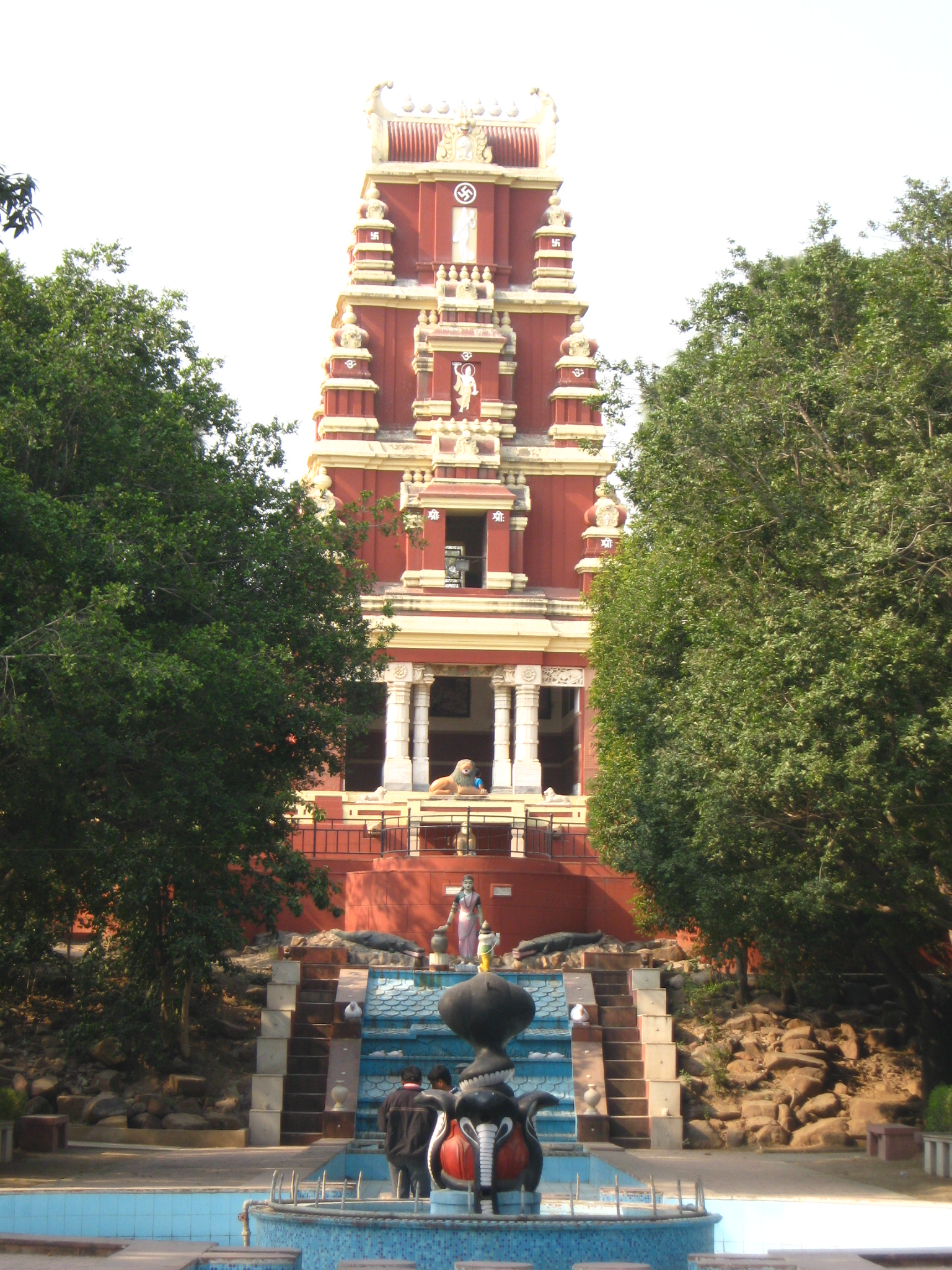
South Indian style Gopuram

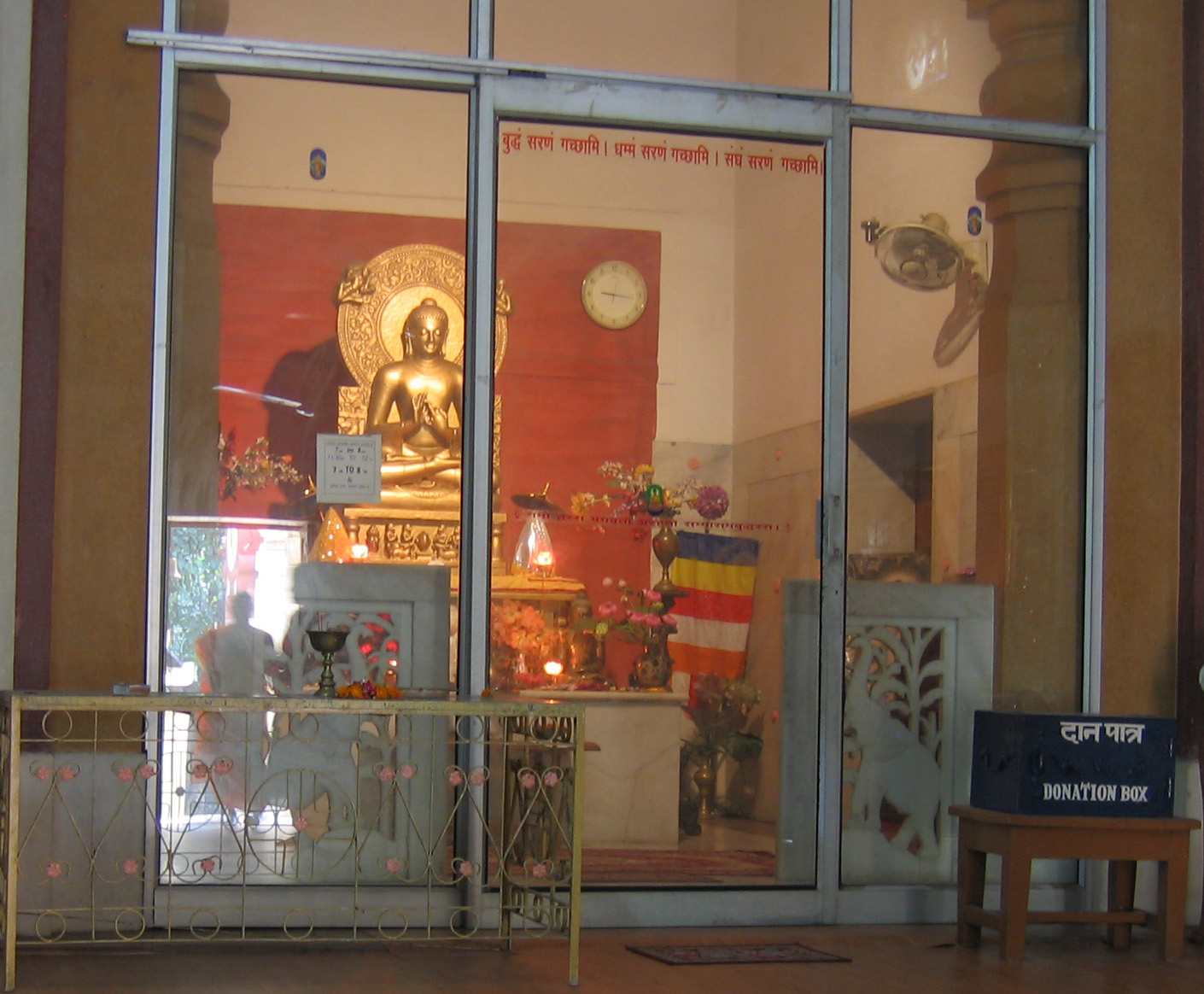
Buddha Vihar
