= Lakshmi Narayana =

Divine couple in Hinduism

- God of Preservation; Goddess of Prosperity; Supreme Deities of Vaishnavism Para Brahman
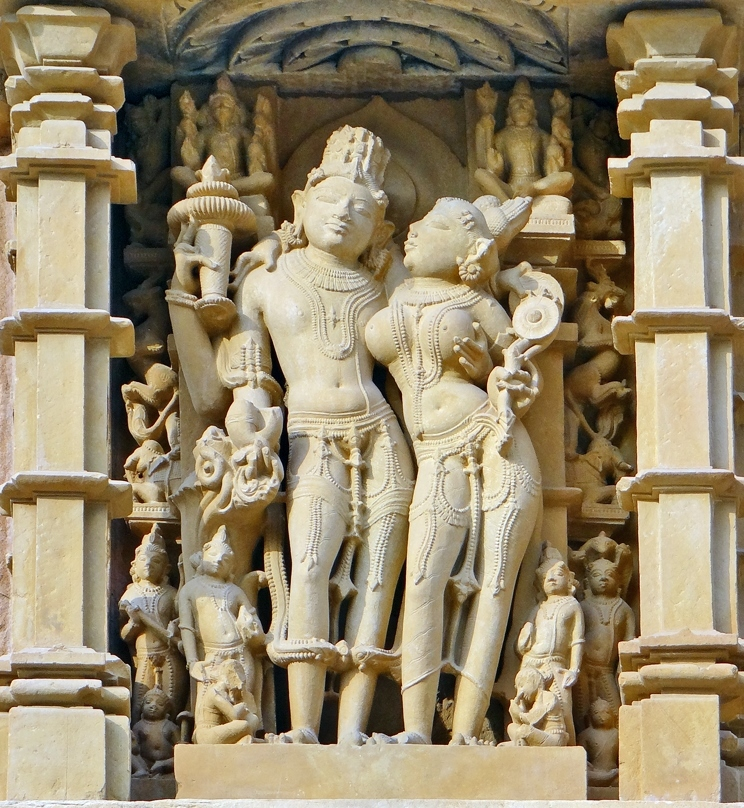
- 11th-century sculpture of Lakshmi-Narayana, Khajuraho
- Devanagari: लक्ष्मी-नारायण
- Sanskrit transliteration: Lakṣmīnārāyaṇa
- Affiliation: Vaishnavism
- Abode: Vaikuntha
- Weapon: Panchajanya, Kaumodaki, Sudarshana Chakra, Sharanga, Nandaka
- Symbol: Padma
- Mount: Garuda
- Texts: Bhagavata Purana; Vishnu Purana; Garuda Purana; Padma Purana

Lakshmi Narayana (Sanskrit: लक्ष्मी-नारायण, IAST: Lakṣmīnārāyaṇa) is the dual representation of the divine couple Vishnu, also known as Narayana, and his consort, Lakshmi, in Hindu tradition and iconography.

== Iconography ==
In a common depiction of Lakshmi Narayana, Vishnu (Narayana) is shown seated, typically in lalitasana (seated posture), with Lakshmi seated on his left thigh. One of his arms (usually the lower left) encircles her, while his other hands hold his attributes of the shankha (conch), chakra (discus), gada (mace), and padma (lotus). Lakshmi typically holds a lotus and may place one arm around Vishnu’s neck or shoulder. This composition is described and illustrated by Nalini Kanta Bhattasali in his catalogue of eastern Indian sculptures.

H. Krishna Sastri records the same arrangement in South Indian tradition: Lakshmi is placed “to the left of the god, by his side or sometimes on his thigh,” her right hand around Vishnu’s neck and his left arm around her waist, with Garuda at the foot of the throne. The Anantashayana or Sheshashayi form shows the divine couple resting upon the serpent-king Shesha. In this form, Vishnu reclines on the coils of the multi-headed serpent floating on the Ocean of Milk; Lakshmi is usually seated at his feet, often massaging them, while a lotus rises from Vishnu’s navel bearing Brahma. In other variants, the couple are both seated on the coils of Shesha, whose hoods form a canopy over them. This reclining or serpent-supported composition appears frequently in South Indian bronzes, eastern Indian reliefs, and later paintings, and is one of the most recognisable representations of the deities in rest between cosmic cycles.

== Theology ==
In Vaishnava literature, Lakshmi is identified as the shakti (divine energy) of Vishnu-Narayana. The Vishnu Purana describes her as his eternal companion who is anapāyinī (inseparable) from him, sharing his all-pervasive nature and having been associated with him prior to creation. Just as Vishnu is the sustainer of the universe, Lakshmi is described as the source of its prosperity and auspiciousness; their joint presence serves to maintain cosmic balance. The Lakshmi Tantra, an Agamic text, describes Lakshmi as the inherent and dynamic power of Narayana, through whom the five divine functions of creation, sustenance, dissolution, concealment, and grace are carried out. Through this same power she is described to bestow prosperity upon devotees, while the withdrawal of her favour is associated with misfortune.

When Vishnu descends upon creation as an avatar to restore cosmic order, he is joined by his consort. When Vishnu descended upon the world as Parashurama, the goddess incarnated herself as Dharani; when he was born as Rama, Lakshmi appeared as Sita; and when he was Krishna, she appeared as Radha and Rukmini. In Vishnu's incarnation as Kalki, he is described to wed Padmavati, who will also be an incarnation of Lakshmi.

This manifestation of the divine couple is explored in texts such as the Ramayana, Mahabharata, Vishnu Purana, Bhagavata Purana, Brahma Vaivarta Purana, and the Skanda Purana.

== Legends ==
The most significant Lakshmi Narayana myth that appears in various Puranas is the Samudra Manthana, where Vishnu assumes his Kurma avatar to assist the devas and the asuras in the churning the Ocean of Milk. Lakshmi emerges as one of the many treasures that are the product of the churning. The devas request Vishnu to marry her, and hence her auspiciousness is wed to his divinity, restoring the cosmic order.

The Vishnu Purana describes this legend:

The goddess Sri of vibrant beauty rose from this milk, standing in a blossoming lotus with a lotus in her hand ... Wearing celestial garlands and garments, bathed and adorned with ornaments, with all the gods looking on, she went to Hari's chest. While resting on Hari's chest, Lakshmi made the gods know immediate supreme bliss, O Maitreya, just by looking at them.

— Vishnu Purana, Verses 1.9.100; 106; 107

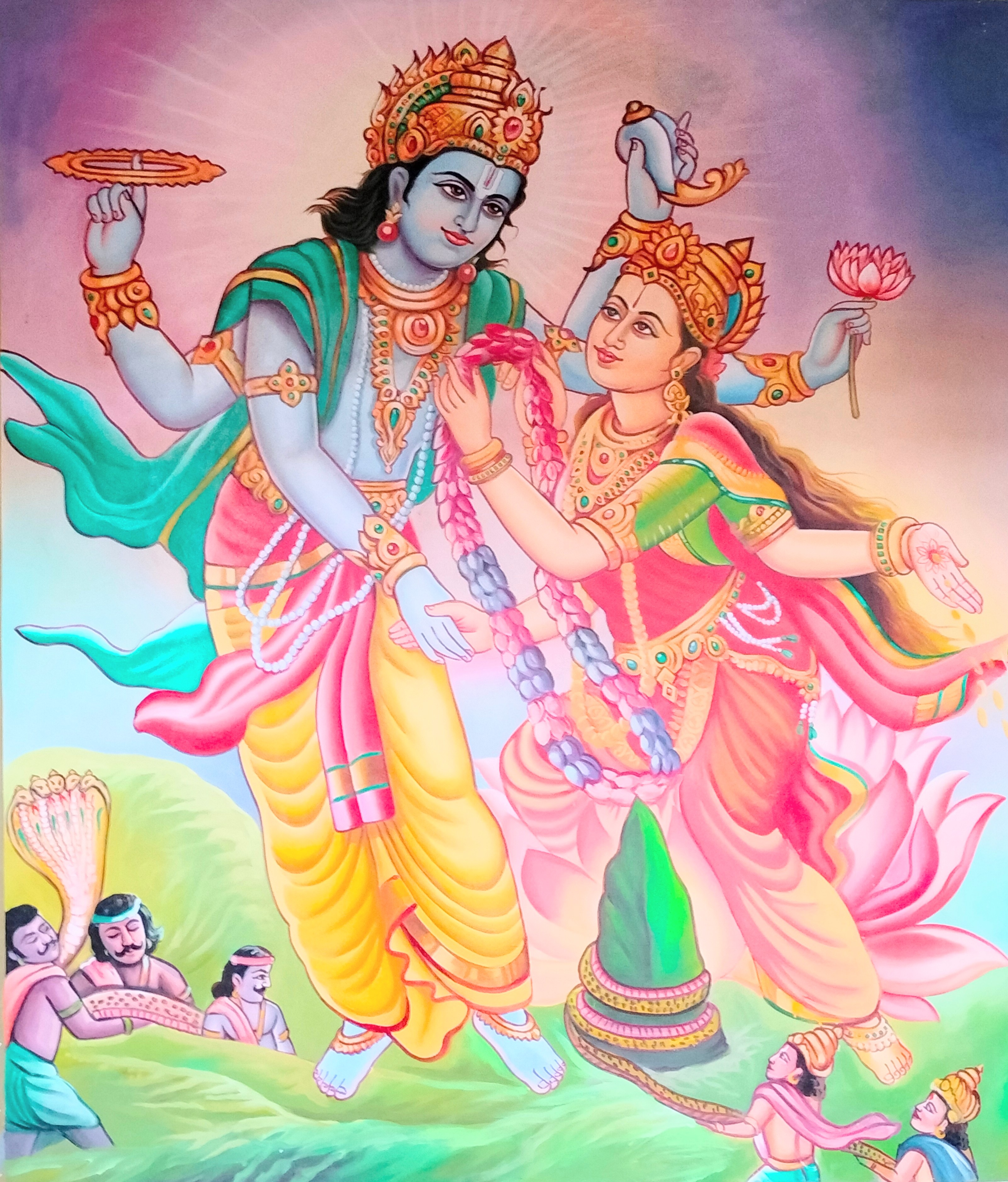
Painting of the wedding of Vishnu and Lakshmi, Koodal Alagar Temple, Madurai

In the Legend of Tirumala, the sage Bhrigu is selected to choose the deity to whom a yajna shall be dedicated towards. After rejecting Brahma, Indra, and Shiva, he arrives at Vaikuntha, where he observes Lakshmi massaging the feet of Vishnu who is reclined on Shesha. Bhrigu is angered by this and kicks the chest of Vishnu with his foot. A calm Vishnu is concerned for the sage, and receives him with honour. Pleased, Bhrigu decides that the yajna should be offered to Vishnu. But Lakshmi is greatly enraged, the chest being the region of Vishnu most associated with her, and because her consort had not risen to the insult. She descends upon the earth as Padmavati, the daughter of a Chola king, and her consort assumes the form of Srinivasa. Srinivasa finds Padmavati, marries her once more and is hailed as the primary deity of Tirumala.

In literature, Lakshmi and Narayana are often offered epithets stemming from their relationship - Vishnu is hailed as Lakshmipati, the husband of Lakshmi, while Lakshmi is called Vishnupriya, the favourite of Vishnu, as well as Vaishnavi and Narayani, the greatest female devotee, and Shakti of Vishnu.

In the Prapanna Parijata, Lakshmi declares that the duality of her consort and herself represents Brahman:

God, Narayana, is the essence of existence; and I, the Supreme Lakshmi, am the attribute (be-ness) of it. Hence what is known as Lakshmìnârâyana is the Brahman which is the eternal One.

— Prapanna Parijata

== Worship ==
=== Traditions ===
==== Sri Vaishnavism ====
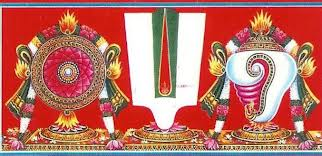
The Tenkalai Sri Vaishnava urdhva pundra, a representation of Lakshmi Narayana

In Sri Vaishnavism, the deity Narayana is worshipped as the supreme deity, and his consort Lakshmi as the supreme goddess. Lakshmi is regarded to be the source of salvation, Narayana, and is hence revered by adherents in order to reach God. The origin of the tradition's name is sometimes associated with the goddess herself, who is also called Sri. In various sub-divisions of this tradition, devotees worship specific forms of Vishnu or Lakshmi or together, such as Narayana or Lakshmi, Lakshmi Narayana, Rama or Sita, Sita Rama, and others. The Urdhva Pundra, the sacred mark they wear on their bodies, is conceived to be a combination of the white feet of Vishnu, and the red streak in between represents Lakshmi. In this tradition, Narayana is often represented with three aspects of Lakshmi: Sridevi, Bhudevi, and Niladevi.

==== Swaminarayan Sampradaya ====
In the Vaishnavite tradition of the Swaminarayan Sampradaya, a flute-bearing Krishna is worshipped with his consort Radha, and together the deity is referred as Radha Krishna, while Krishna in his four-hands form is identified with Narayana in the text Shikshapatri, and is worshipped with his consort, Lakshmi. The deity is referred as Lakshmi Narayana. The founder of the sect, Swaminarayan, installed the murtis of Radha Krishna and Lakshmi Narayana at the Shri Swaminarayan Mandir, Vadtal and Swaminarayan Mandir, Gadhada in Gujarat.

==== Dvaita Vedanta ====
In the Dvaita Vedanta tradition of Madhvacharya, Vishnu (Narayana) is worshipped as the supreme, independent reality. Lakshmi is regarded as his eternal consort and shakti, the highest among all paratantra (dependent) entities. She is described to be inseparably associated with him in divine worship and activity, yet ontologically subordinate.

=== Temples ===
Many major shrines dedicated to Lakshmi Narayana are located in South India, particularly among the Divya Desams of the Sri Vaishnava tradition, where the divine couple is worshipped as the central deities. The Ranganathaswamy Temple at Srirangam, the foremost Divya Desam is one of the largest functioning Hindu temple complexes. Other prominent centres include the Venkateswara Temple at Tirumala, and the Varadharaja Perumal Temple in Kanchipuram.

Other significant temples dedicated to Lakshmi Narayana couple include the Laxminarayan Temple in New Delhi, the Lakshmi Narayan Temple at Bhopal, the Birla Mandir at Jaipur, and the Lakshmi Narayan Temple at Agartala.

== Gallery ==
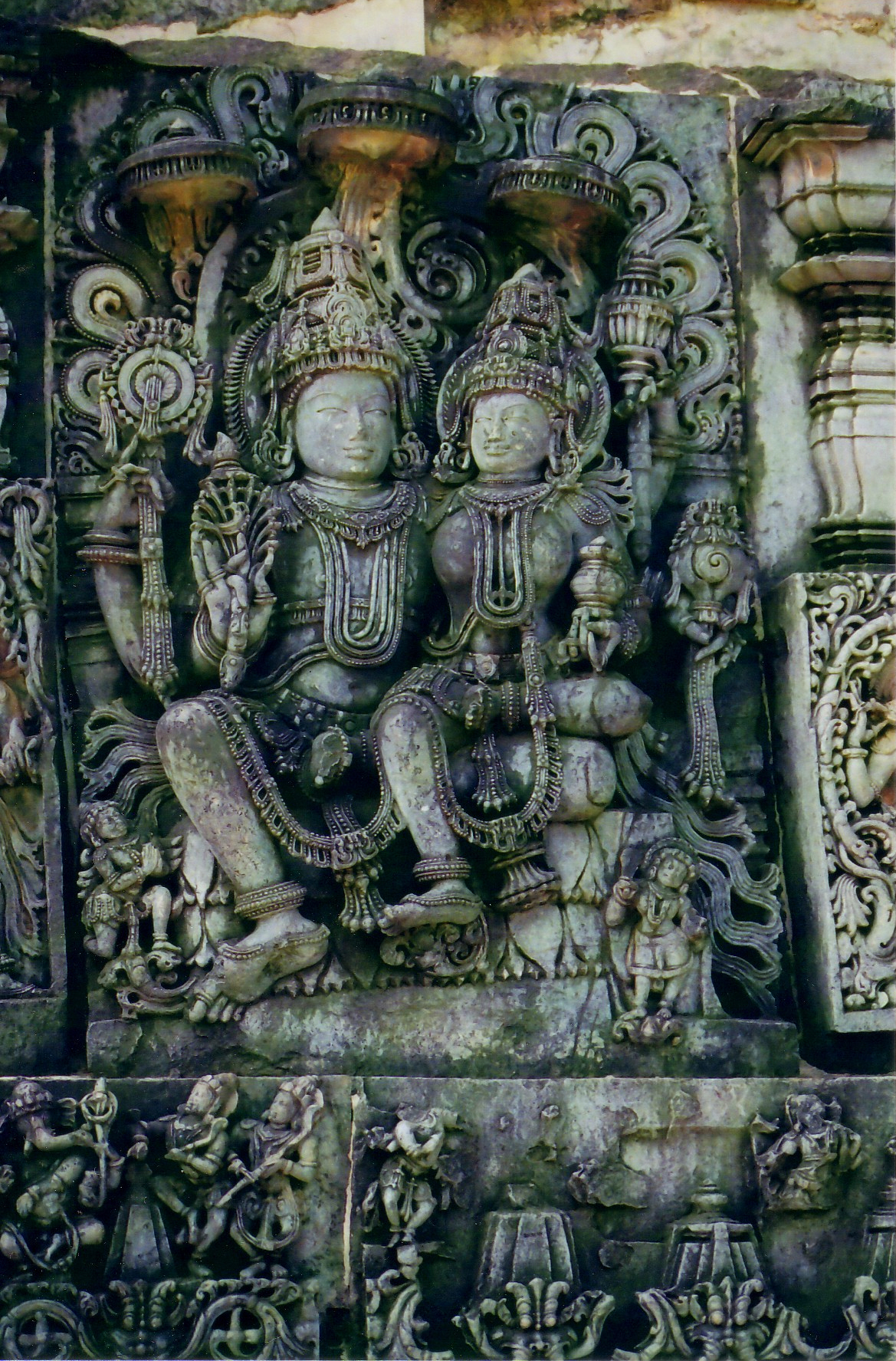
Lakshmi Narayana at Halebidu, Karnataka, India

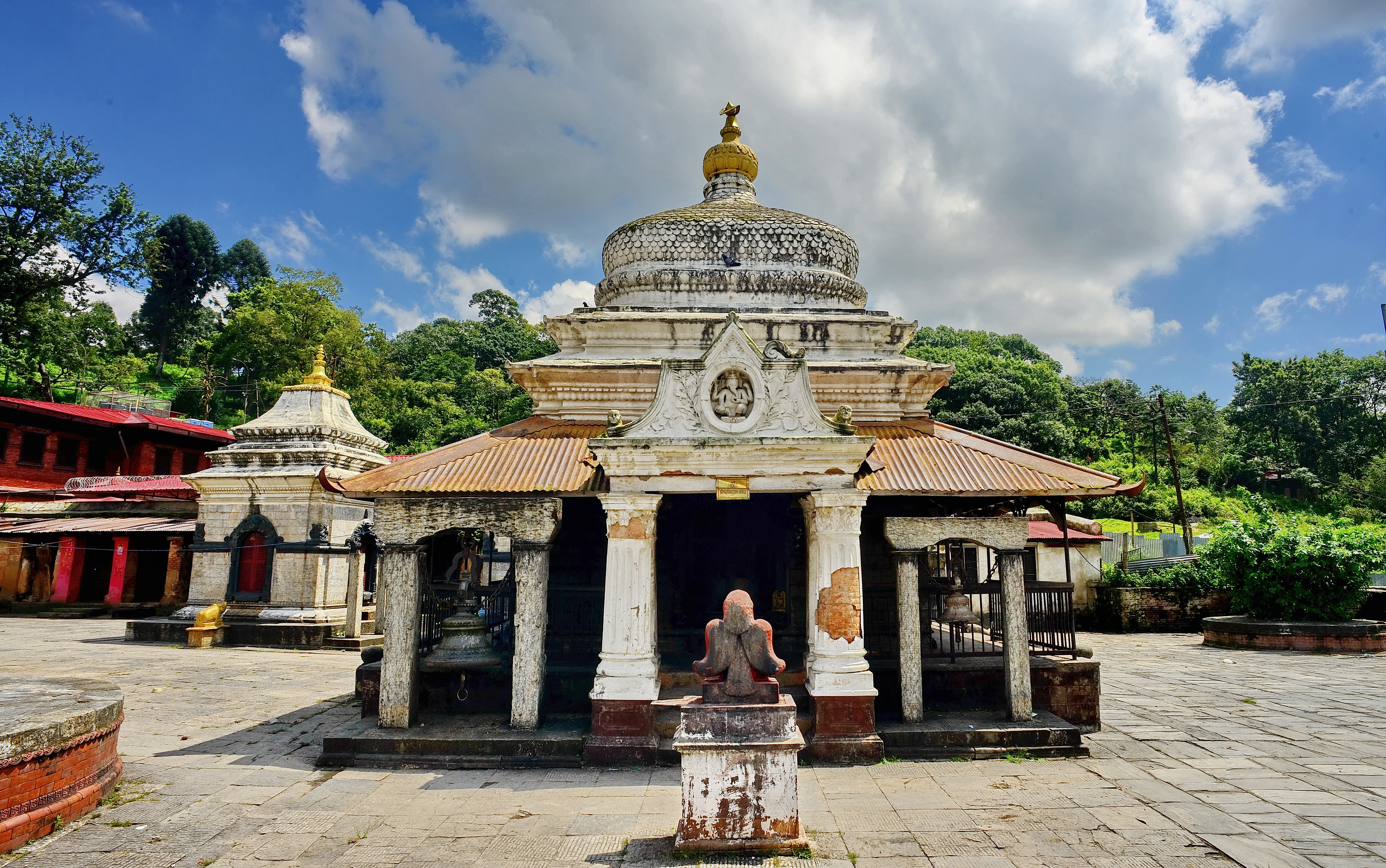
Lakshmi Narayan Temple at Pashupatinath Temple Complex, Kathmandu, Nepal

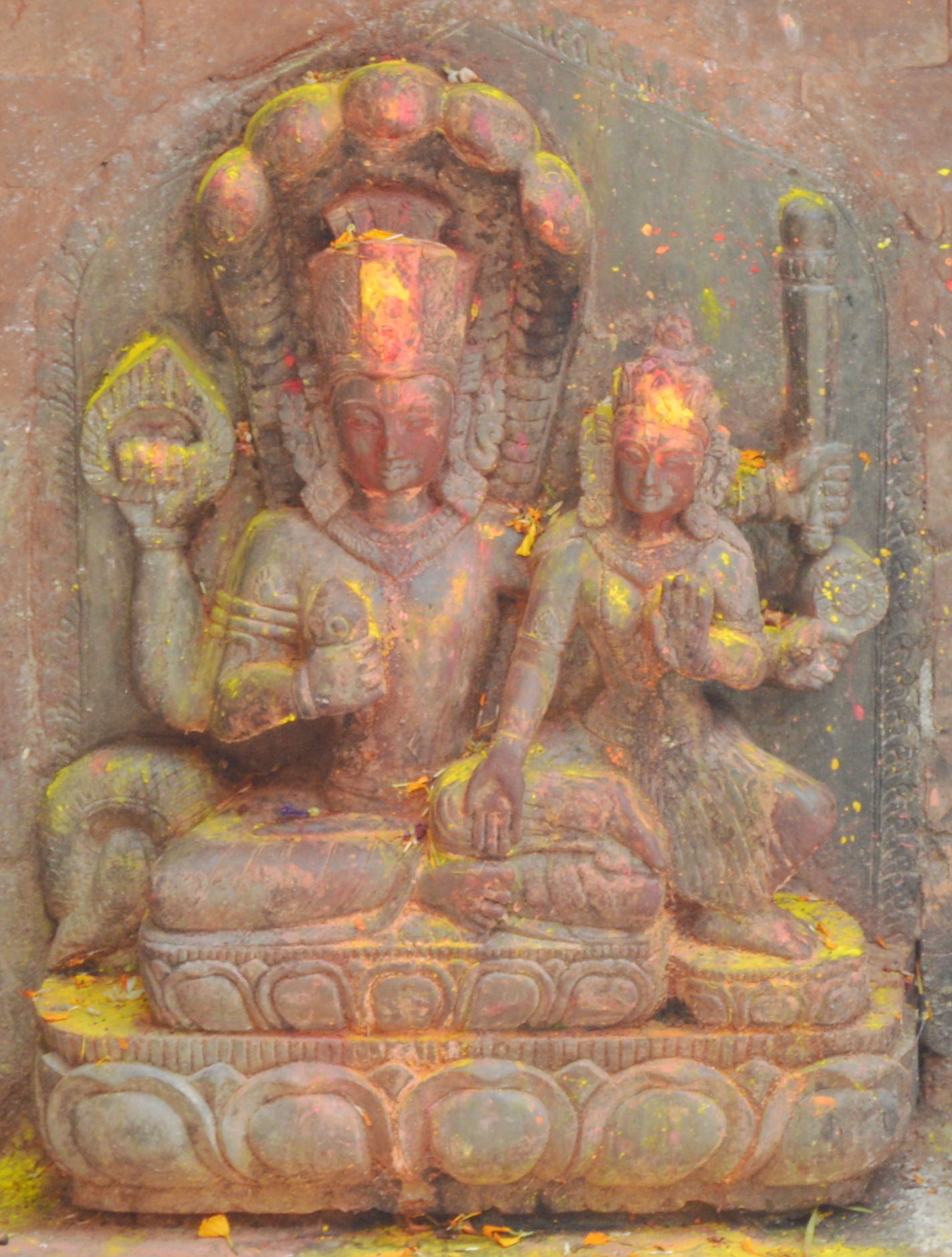
Lakshmi Narayana statue at Naxal, Kathmandu

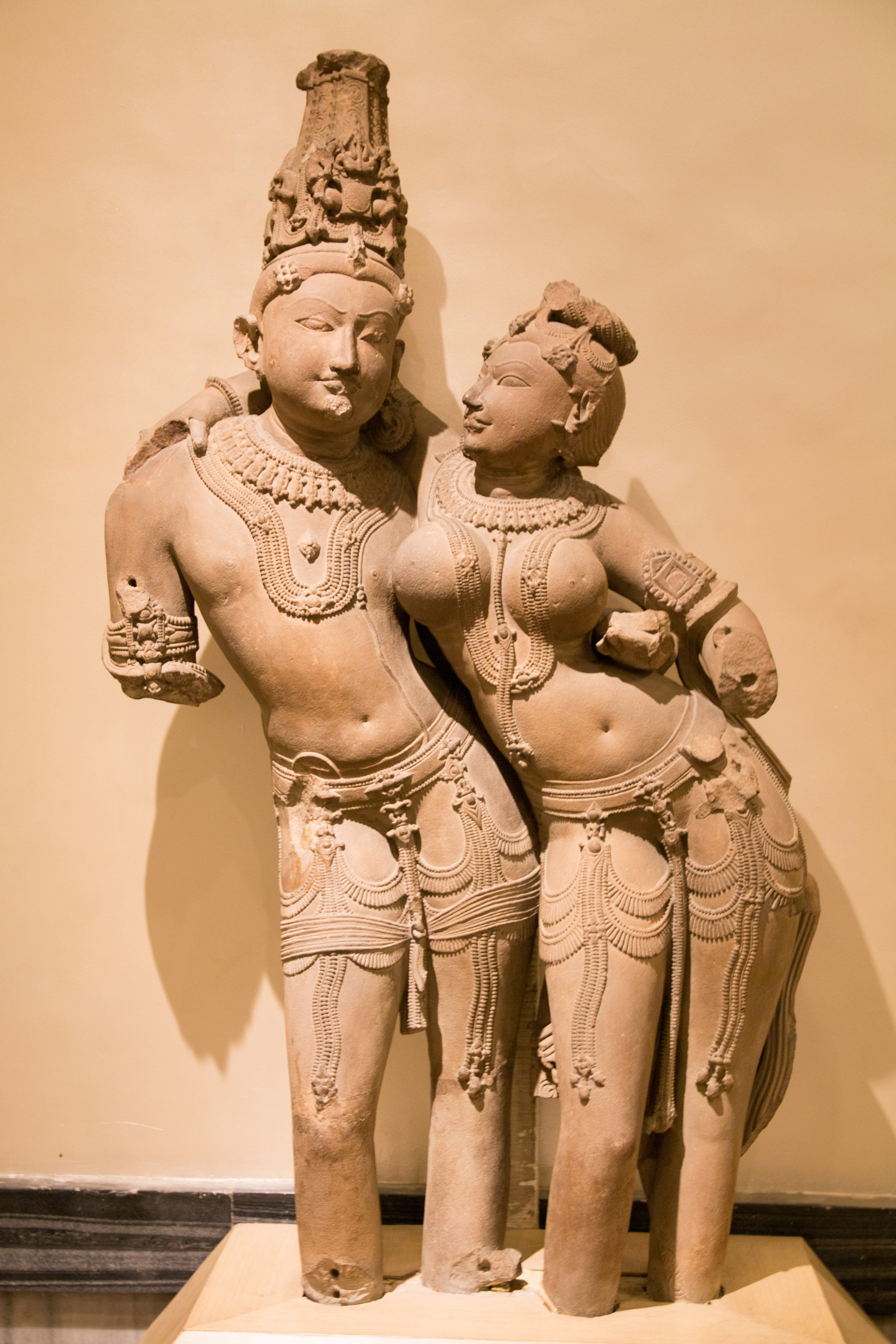
Lakshmi Narayana, National Museum, Delhi

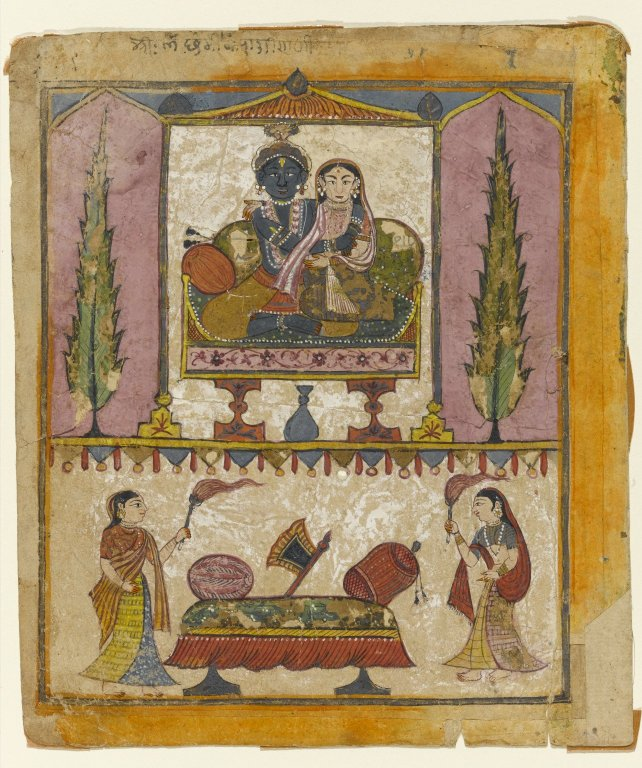
Lakshmi Naryana Frontispiece from the "Tula Ram" Bhagavata Purana - Brooklyn Museum

== See also ==
- Radha Krishna
- Kalyanasundara
- Somaskanda
- Shiva Parvati
