= Lakshmi Narayan Temple, Bhopal =

Lakshmi Narayan Temple
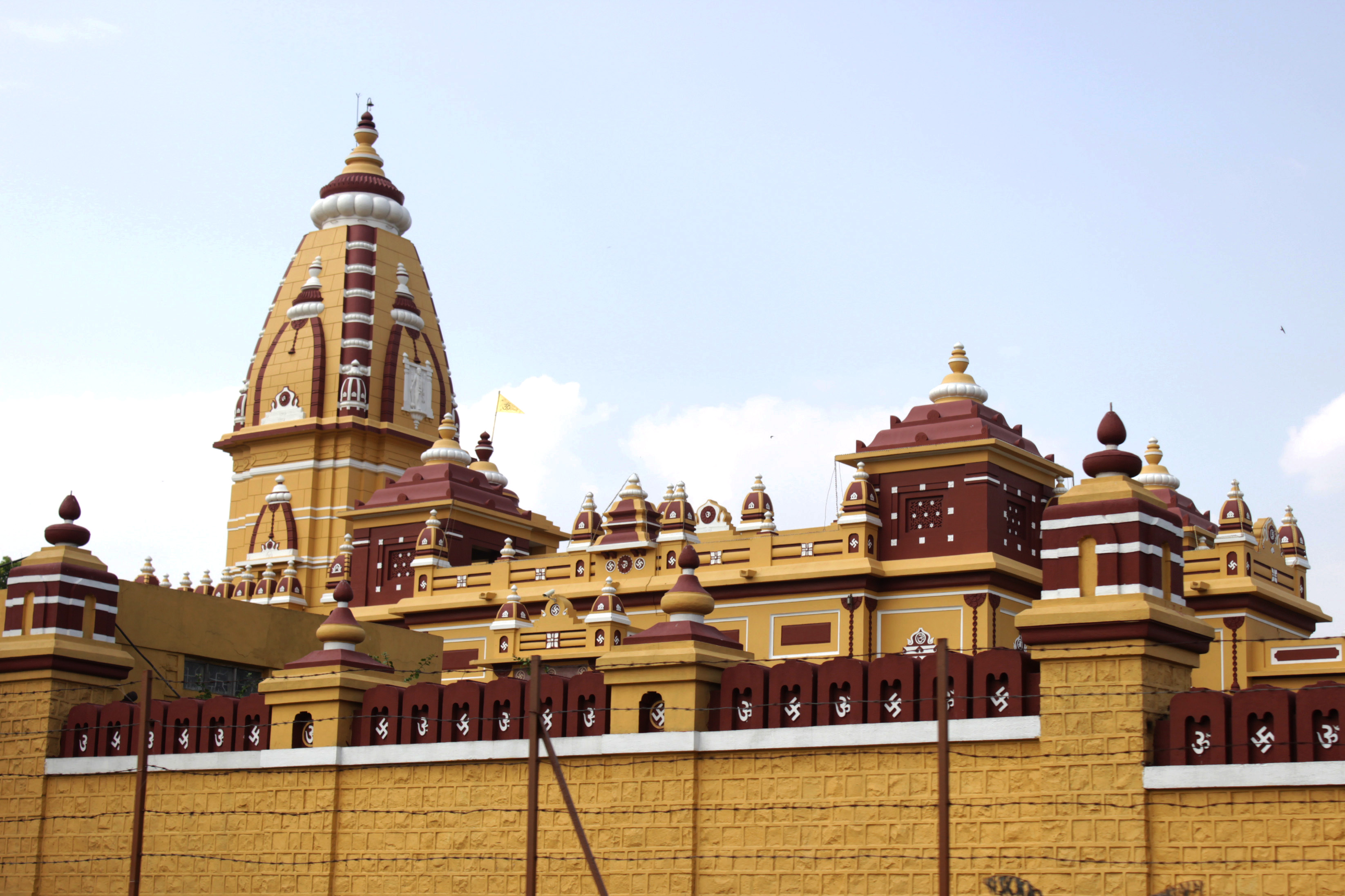
- Lakshmi Narayan Temple in Bhopal

- Location in Madhya Pradesh

Religion
- Affiliation: Hinduism
- District: Bhopal
- Deity: Lakshmi Narayan, (Vishnu and Lakshmi
- Festivals: Janmashtami, Diwali

Location
- Location: Bhopal
- State: Madhya Pradesh
- Country: India
- Interactive map of Lakshmi Narayan Temple
- Coordinates: 23°14′18″N 77°24′31″E

Architecture
- Type: Nagar Shaili
- Creator: B.D. Birla
- Established: Dwarka Prasad Mishra
- Groundbreaking: Dr. Kailashnath Katju
- Completed: 1964

Lakshmi Narayan Temple, popularly known as Birla Mandir in Bhopal, is located in the Malviya Nagar area of Bhopal, south of the lake near the Arera Hills. A museum is built near the temple which houses idols brought from places like Raisen, Sehore, Mandsaur and Shahdol in Madhya Pradesh. Stone idols of Shiva, Vishnu and other incarnations can be seen here. The museum built near the temple is open daily from 9 am to 5 pm except Mondays.

== History ==
The foundation stone of this temple was laid in the year 1960 by the former Chief Minister of Madhya Pradesh, Dr. Kailashnath Katju and the inauguration was done in the year 1964 by the Chief Minister Dwarka Prasad Mishra.

== Description ==
The Birla Mandir established five decades ago on Arera Hill in Bhopal has been a centre of religious faith for years. The beautiful idols of Lord Vishnu and Goddess Lakshmi installed in the temple are attracting devotees towards it. Spread over about 7-8 acres of hilly area, the fame of this temple has spread in various cities of the country and the state.

Inside the temple, the carvings of various mythological scenes on marble are not only worth seeing, but teachings from the Bhagavad Gita and Ramayana are also inscribed on them.

Apart from the idols of Vishnu and Lakshmi, the idol of Shiva is situated on one side and that of Maa Jagdamba on the other. Hanuman and Shivling are established in the temple premises. The huge conch shell in front of the main entrance of the temple is also worth seeing. At the time of the establishment of the temple, former Chief Minister Kailash Nath had given land to the Birla family to establish an industry in the city and also put a condition that they should build a grand and huge temple in this inaccessible hilly area. At the time of the inauguration of the temple, a huge Vishnu Mahayagya was also organized here, in which many scholars and religious scholars participated. Even today, this temple is the main center of public faith. On Janmashtami, the main event of Lord Krishna's birth is organized here, in which a large number of devotees participate and worship Vishnu.

== See also ==
- Laxminarayan Temple, Delhi
- List of Hindu temples in India
