= Hosur Narasimhaiah =

Indian activist and physicist (1920–2005)

PB Hosur Narasimhaiah
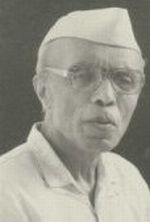
- Born: 6 June 1920; Hosur, Gowribidanur Taluk, Chikkaballapur district, Karnataka, India
- Died: 31 January 2005 (aged 84); Bangalore, India
- Citizenship: Indian
- Education: Central College of Bangalore (BSc, MSc); Ohio State University (PhD)
- Known for: Scepticism
- Awards: Rajyotsava Award (1969); Padma Bhushan (1984) Nadoja
- Scientific career
- Fields: Physics
- Workplaces: National College, Bangalore; Southern Illinois University; Bangalore University
- Thesis: The Radioactive Decay of Hafnium and Thulium Isotopes (1960)

H. (Hanumanthappa) Narasimhaiah (more popularly Hosur Narasimhaiah); 6 June 1920 – 31 January 2005) was an Indian physicist, educator, writer, freedom fighter and rationalist from Karnataka. Publicly known as "HN", he was the Vice-Chancellor of Bangalore University and the president of the National Education Society. He was conferred the Padma Bhushan award by the Government of India in 1984.

As there was no formal school in Hale Upparahalli, where he was born, he attended the Government School in Gauribidanur, and continued high school at the National High School, Basavanagudi in Bangalore. He walked 85 km for two days to reach the city. A meeting with Mahatma Gandhi in 1936, in which he served as an interpreter to Gandhi, inspired him to follow Gandhism the rest of his life. While in his final year of BSc at the Central College of Bangalore, he gave up his education to join Gandhi's Quit India movement in 1942. He was arrested and imprisoned for about nine months.

He finished his bachelor's degree with physics honours in 1944, and master's degree in 1946. He was immediately recruited to the faculty of physics at the National College, Bangalore, where he taught until 1957. He went for doctoral research in the United States and earned a PhD in 1960 in nuclear physics from Ohio State University. From 1961 he was Principal of the National College, Basavanagudi. He became the Vice-Chancellor of the Bangalore University in 1972, the post he held until his resignation in 1977. He went on to serve in the Karnataka Legislative Council.

A self-proclaimed rationalist, he was a renowned sceptic. While in office, he constituted and chaired the "Committee to Investigate Miracles and Other Verifiable Superstitions" that led to public challenges of the miraculous claims of Hindu godmen, including Sathya Sai Baba and Sai Krishna. As a leader of the Karnataka legislators to investigate a black-magic curse called banamathi, he disproved the existence of such claims. He was the founder of the Bangalore Science Forum. He is so far the only Indian to become elected Fellow of the Committee for the Scientific Investigation of Claims of the Paranormal.

== Life ==
Narasimhaiah was born in Hale Upparahalli, a village near Gauribidanur in Karnataka, India. His father was a village school teacher, and mother, a labourer. He had a younger sister. Having no formal school in his village, he attended the Government School in Gauribidanur, the nearest town. He completed his elementary education in the primary school, which had no further studies beyond eighth standard. He stopped school for a year. His school headmaster M.S. Narayana Rao, who had just been transferred to the National High School, Basavanagudi in Bangalore, invited and helped him get admission in his new school. Without money, he went on foot to Bangalore (about 85 km), taking two days to arrive, and joined the school in 1935. He stayed with his headmaster for six months, until he could get allotment in the school hostel, the Poor Boys' Home, as he called it. He met with Mahatma Gandhi when the latter visited the National High School in 1936. His teacher selected him to be the interpreter of Gandhi's Hindi speech into Kannada. From this moment on, his life was entirely influenced by Gandhi's views and lifestyle, including wearing khadi throughout his life. He went on to Central College of Bangalore studying for his B.Sc. During his final year in 1942, Gandhi launched the Quit India movement to end British rule. He gave up his degree to join the movement, the event which he described as "the most momentous decision in my life." The consequence of his decision was his imprisonment for nearly nine months, in different jails, in Yerwada Central Jail, in Mysore jail and in the Central Jail in Bangalore. Comparing his Central College hostel and the Central Jail, he remarked that he found "no difference" between the two as both provided him "free boarding and lodging." After a year he completed his bachelor's degree, B.Sc. with physics honours. He earned his MSc in physics with first class from the Central College in 1946. The same year he started his academic career as a lecturer at the National College, Bangalore.

After teaching for over ten years, in 1957, he went to Columbus, Ohio, for further degree. He received his PhD degree in nuclear physics from the Ohio State University in 1960. His thesis was The Radioactive Decay of Hafnium and Thulium Isotopes. From 1961 to 1972 he was Principal of the National College, Basavanagudi, in Bangalore.

He became the fourth Vice-Chancellor of the Bangalore University from 1972, and was reappointed in 1975. He remained in office until 1977, during this time he introduced psychology, social work, drama, music and dance as new subjects. He went on to serve the Karnataka Legislative Council. At the time of his death, he was the President of the National Education Society of Karnataka.

Narasimhiah was a connoisseur of Carnatic Music and had close association with the renowned Carnatic Musician R K Padmanabha. R K Padmanabha led a 1000 people goshti in remembrance of Dr H Narasimhiah as a mark of respect.

Narasimhaiah remained a confirmed bachelor. He quipped,

Marriage is a gamble, a lottery: I have told many people the reason I have not got married is that I forgot! ... Now sometimes I do feel lonely. only momentarily. I miss companionship, not just in the sense of having a wife.

He was considered as champion of humanism and atheism in India. But he described himself as rationalist, and added,

I'm not an atheist: I don't go to a temple because God is everywhere. A temple is like a jail for God. I don't believe in religious practices or commercial Gods either.

In his later years, he suffered from prolonged septicaemia and died on 31 January 2005 in an intensive care unit of Maiya Multi-speciality Hospital in Bangalore. His body was kept in the National High School for public viewing. He was cremated, as he had willed (he had reserved INR 2,000 for it), at Hossur with a state official funeral the same day evening.

== Contributions ==
Narasimhaiah wrote a collection of essays titled Tereda Mana ('ತೆರೆದ ಮನ', Open Mind) and an autobiography named Horaatada Haadi ('ಹೋರಾಟದ ಹಾದಿ', The Path of Struggle).

In 1962, he founded the Bangalore Science Forum, which conducts a weekly series of public lectures on science topics. This non-profit organisation has conducted almost 2,000 popular science lectures by eminent scientists and over 500 popular science films. He was also responsible for establishing the Bangalore Lalithakala Parishat and B.V. Jagadeesh Science Centre.

As a Vice-Chancellor, he constituted and chaired the "Committee to Investigate Miracles and Other Verifiable Superstitions" in 1976. Members of the committee included scientists, academics and rationalists such as A.R. Vasudeva Murthy, Roddam Narasimha, Vinodha Murthy, Anupama Niranjana and A.M. Dharmalingam. The committee aimed to debunk claims of miracles and paranormal phenomena, specifically by Hindu godmen. The first challenged was Sathya Sai Baba, one of the most prominent godmen of India, who was observed to materialise holy ash and objects out of thin air, among other reported miracles such as bi-location and healing of the sick and wounded. Narasimhaiah personally wrote three letters to Sai Baba asking him to publicly demonstrate the miracles under controlled conditions. Sai Baba refused to comply, and remarked, "Science must confine its inquiry only to things belonging to the human senses, while spiritualism transcends the senses." Narasimhaiah commented this refusal as indication of fraudulence in the miracle stories. A public controversy and debate then ensued. When the committee requested to visit Sai Baba, he locked himself in. The committee was also involved in exposing a 7-year old Sai Krishna of Pandavapura (a tiny village near Mysore), a mini-Avatar and an alleged protégé of Sathya Sai Baba. This exposition compelled many godmen to admit that they did not have special abilities. The committee was dissolved in 1977, as he was forced to resign from the office of Vice Chancellor.

In 1985, Narasimhaiah challenged a godman, Shivabalayogi, who claimed that he could let down rain by praying. To test the claim, Shivabalayogi was to specifically fill up the T.G. Halli reservoir by rain to feed Bangalore. It never rained.

Although a Hindu by birth, Narasimhaiah refused to practice religious rituals. He did not perform tonsure (cutting the hair off the head) upon the death of his father. He would eat food during a solar eclipse to demonstrate that it does not cause indigestion, as Hindus believed to be so and would fast. He did inaugurate the procession at Dasara, a festival with homage to Goddess Chamundeshwari, in 2004. But he explained that it was out of respect of "tradition and culture".

His famous quote is: A poor teacher complains, an average teacher explains, a good teacher teaches, a great teacher inspires.

== Awards and honours ==
Narasimhaiah was conferred the Padma Bhushan in 1984, the third highest civilian awards instituted by the Government of India, for his services in literature and education. He received the Tamrapatra award for his participation in the Indian Freedom Struggle. For his contribution to the popularisation of science he won the Sir M Vishweshwaraiah Award. He was also the only Indian to be elected Fellow of the Committee for the Scientific Investigation of Claims of the Paranormal (CSICOP International), set up by Paul Kurtz in the USA. He received the Sahitya Akademi book prizes for his books Horaatada Haadi and Tereda Mana. In 1983, he was elected the president of Indian Rationalist Association. He was awarded the Rajyotsava Prashasti, the second highest civilian honour, and Basava Puraskara (2001) of the Karnataka state government. He also received the Karnataka Nataka Academy Fellowship in 1990, the Nadoja award (equivalent to Honorary Doctor of Letters) by Kannada University at Hampi, in 1996, and Honorary D.Lit from the Gulbarga University. In 1995, the Government of India (under the ministry led by Deve Gowda) appointed him Chairman of the Kannada Development Authority. In 1980, the Karnataka state government under Gundu Rao nominated him to the Karnataka Legislative Council, which he refused. He served as an independent legislator. He became the head of a legislature committee which investigated banamathi (a black magic involving curse) in some villages of northern Karnataka. His committee concluded that there was no such thing. He was awarded the Goruru Award in 2001. In 2003, he received the Jawaharlal Nehru National Prize for popularising science, on behalf of the Karnataka Science Forum. He was awarded by the then Prime Minister of India, Atal Behari Vajpayee. In April 2011 the executive council of the Committee for Skeptical Inquiry (CSI, formerly Committee for the Scientific Investigation of Claims of the Paranormal) selected Narasimhaiah for inclusion in CSI's Pantheon of Skeptics. The Pantheon of Skeptics was created by CSI to remember the legacy of deceased fellows of CSI and their contributions to the cause of scientific skepticism.

There is a school named in his honour, H. Narasimhaiah Memorial High School in Hossur, established in 1991.

== See also ==
- Sathya Sai Baba#Criticism
