= Kunti Betta =

Set of hills in Karnataka, India

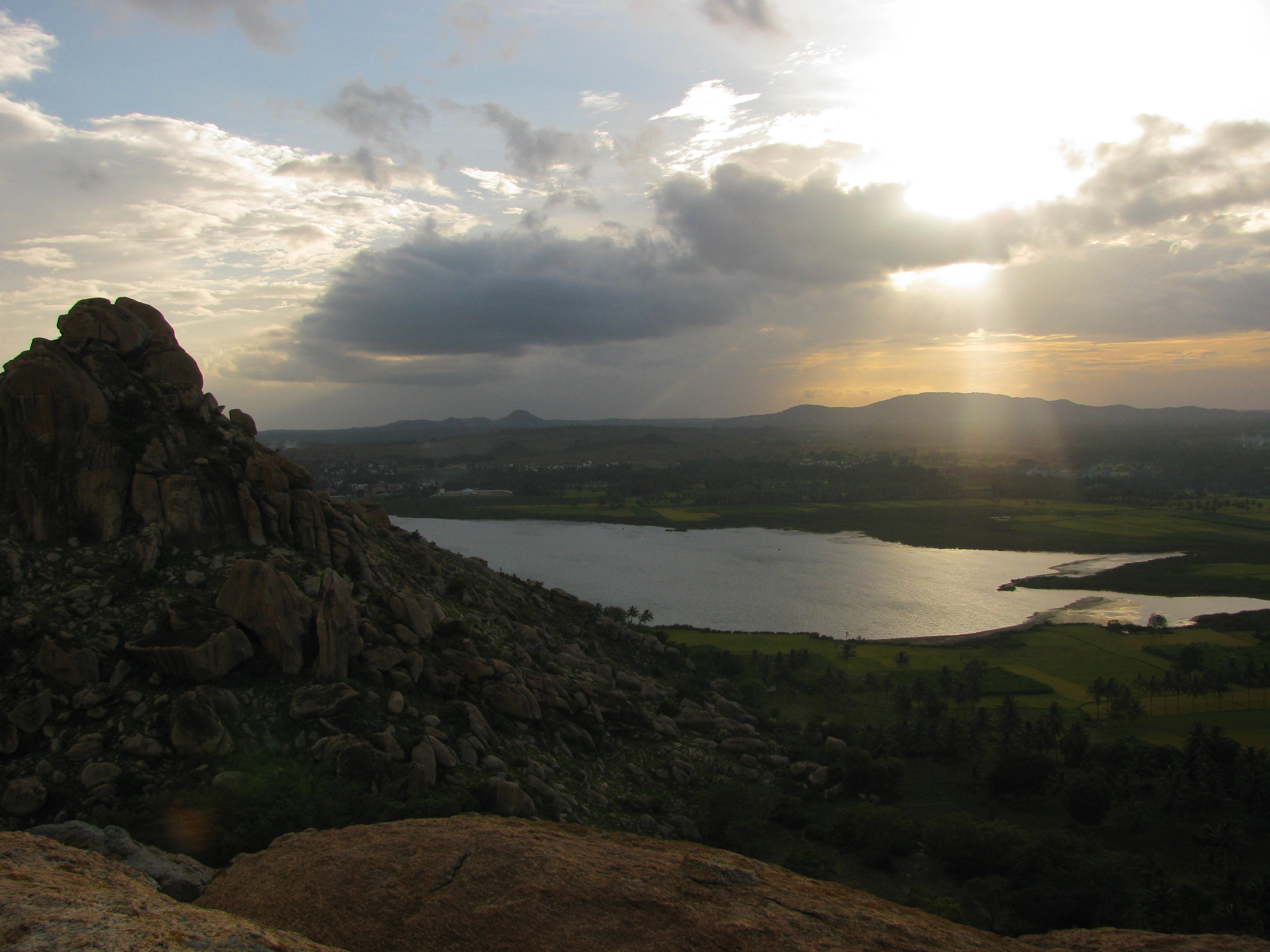
- Sunset from Kunti Betta

Highest point
- Elevation: 2,882 feet (878 m)
- Coordinates: 12°30′28″N 76°41′52″E

Naming
- Etymology: Named for Kunti, mother of Karna, Yudhishthira, Bhima, and Arjuna; from the Indian epic Mahabharata

Geography
- Location within Karnataka
- Location: Pandavapura, Kachenahalli, Karnataka
- Country: India
- State: Karnataka
- District: Mandya

Kunti Betta (also spelled Kunthi Betta) is a set of two rocky hills in Pandavapura, Mandya district, Karnataka. The hills sit at an elevation of 878 m (2,882 ft). Kunti Betta lies not far from Thonnur Lake, and is situated at a distance of 130 km (81 mi) from Bangalore. According to local legend, the Pandavas, a group of five brothers who are the central figures of the Indian epic Mahabharata, and their mother, Kunti concluded their exile at the location, thus earning the town and the hills the names Pandavapura and Kunti Betta (betta means hill in Kannada), respectively. A temple at the foot of the hill is also associated with Kunti. Kunti Betta is a popular trekking destination among tourists. The spot is especially renowned for night trekking and camping. Kunti Betta is also less commonly known as French Rocks, named after a regiment of French soldiers who had assisted rulers Hyder Ali and Tipu Sultan in their war against the British and were garrisoned at the place.
