= Kennalu =

Coordinates: 12°28′N 76°40′E

Kennalu ಕೆನ್ನಾಳು
- village
- Interactive map of Kennalu
- Country: India
- State: Karnataka
- District: Mandya
- Talukas: Pandavapura

Population (2001)
  - Total: 7,470

Languages
  - Official: Kannada
- Time zone: UTC+5:30 (IST)

Kennalu is a village in the southern state of Karnataka, India. It is located in the Pandavapura taluk of Mandya district in Karnataka. 400 years old Shiva temple is an attraction in the village. This temple is renovated by Mr. Veerendra Hegde of Dharmasthala.

== Demographics ==
As of 2001 India census, Kennalu had a population of 7470 with 3795 males and 3675 females.

== See also ==
- Mandya
- Districts of Karnataka
