= Kurugodu Thammanahalli =

Village in Chickballpur District

- Village
- Location in Karnataka, India Kurugodu Thammanahalli (India)
- Coordinates: 13.5873998°N 77.4695552°E
- Country: India
- State: Karnataka
- District: Chikkaballapura
- Talukas: Gauribidanur
- Elevation: 684 m (2,244 ft)

Population (2011)
  - Total: 563

Languages
  - Official: Kannada, Telugu
- Time zone: UTC+5:30 (IST)
- PIN: 561210
- Telephone code: 08155
- Vehicle registration: KA 40
- Lok Sabha constituency: Chikballapur (Lok Sabha constituency)

Kurugodu Thammanahalli is a village in the southern state of Karnataka, India. It is located in the Gauribidanur taluk of Chikkaballapura district in Karnataka. It is situated 9 km away from sub-district headquarter Gauribidanur and 44 km away from district headquarter Chikkaballapura

== Demographics ==
According to Census 2011 information the location code or village code of Kurugodu Thammanahalli village is 623218. Kurugodu Thammanahalli village belongs to Mudugere gram panchayat.

The total geographical area of village is 127.76 hectares. Kurugodu Thammanahalli has a total population of 563 peoples with 296 males and 267 females. There are about 127 houses in Kurugodu Thammanahalli village. Gauribidanur is nearest town to Kurugodu Thammanahalli which is approximately 9 km away.

== Economy ==
Agriculture is the main occupation for people belongs to Kurugodu Thammanahalli. The land of this part is composed of black and red, Most of the land is cultivated with maize, sunflower, millet, silk, a little vegetable, flowers.

== Facilities ==
Kurugodu Thammanahalli has below types of facilities.

- Government primary School
- Nursery school
- Mudugere KMF (Karnataka Milk Federation) Dairy

== Temples ==
- Hanuman Temple
- Marigamma Temple
