= Jayalakshmi Seethapura =

Indian Kannada folklorist, writer

T. Jayalakshmi
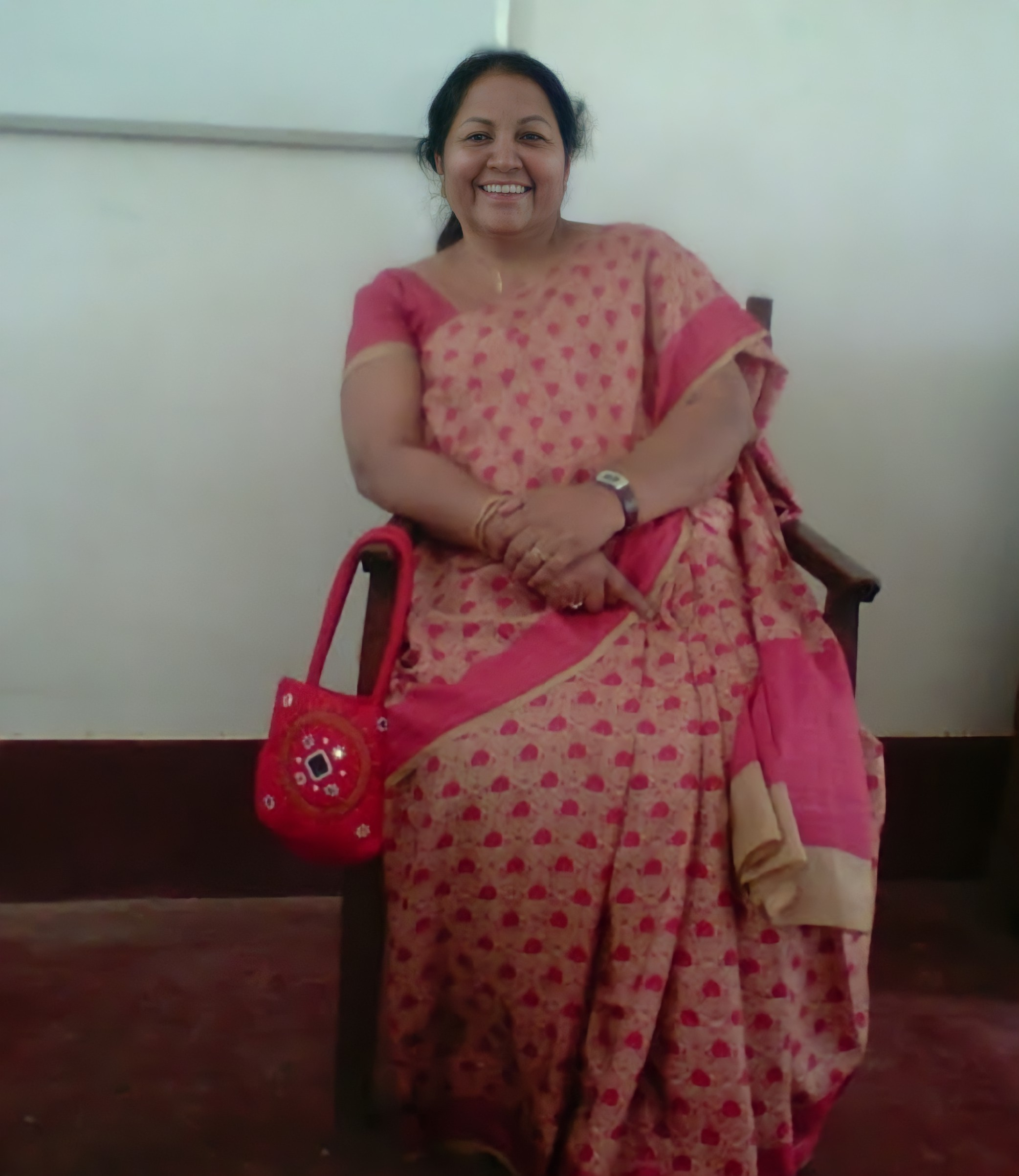
- Dr. Seethapura at KIKS, Mysore University
- Born: 23 September 1954; Seethapura, Pandavapura, Karnataka, India
- Died: 16 June, 2024
- Writing career
- Pen name: Jayalakshmi Seethapura
- Genres: Folk music, folk Literature, folk medicine, folk arts and cultural studies

Dr. T. Jayalakshmi, known by her pen name as Dr. Jayalakshmi Seethapura (Kannada: ಡಾ. ಜಯಲಕ್ಷ್ಮಿ ಸೀತಾಪುರ), was one of the eminent folklorists of modern India who writes in Kannada language. She was a retired Folklore professor of Mysore University. Jayalakshmi has performed hundreds of state and national level cultural competitions as judge. Her books on folklore have well received by the readers of Karnataka.

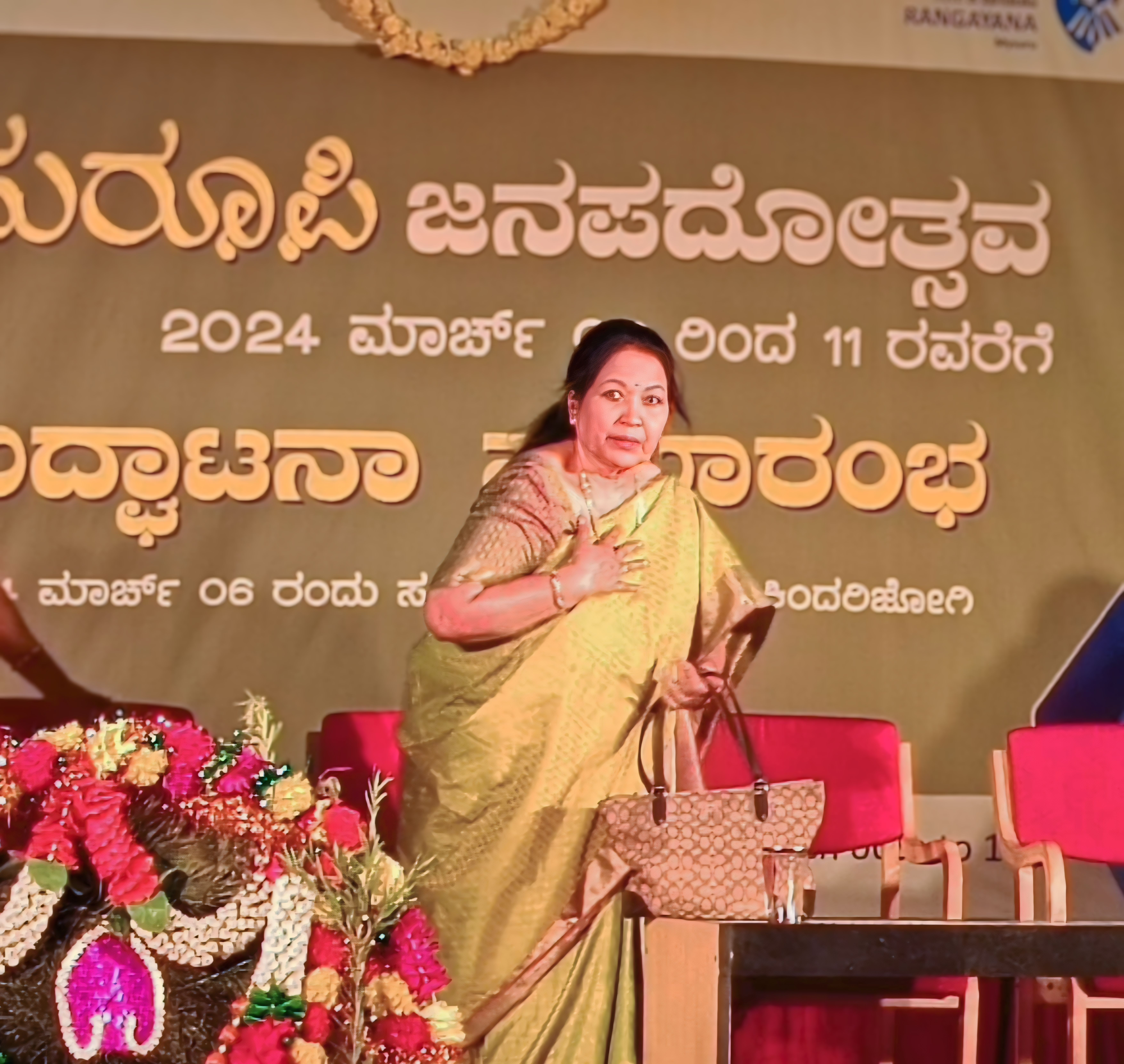
Jayalakshmi Seethapura at Bahuroopi Rangayana in 2024

Jayalakshmi has written more than 30 books on folklore and few are "Namma suttina Janapada Kathana Geethegalu"(published by 'Karnataka Janapada and Yakshagana academy'), "Hakki haaryave gidadaga", "Jaanapada hatti", "Kalyanavenni Janarella"(published by Kannada Sahitya Parishat) and many more. She has written numerous articles on folklore and folk literature of Karnataka. Dr. Seethapura received the Karnataka Janapada academy award in 2016.

== Death ==
Jayalakshmi met with a road accident and admitted to hospital. She died of cardiac arrest on 16 June 2024 while being treated for injuries. She was 70.

== Books ==
Dr. Jayalakshmi has written more than 30 books, mostly related to Folklore and Cultural studies. Some of these are:

- Hakki haaryave gidadaga
- Kalyanavenni janarella
- Jaanapada Hatti
- Namma Suttina Janapada Kathanageethegalu

== Awards ==
- 2017 - Presided the chair at ‛6th Pandavapura Taluk Kannada Sahitya Sammelana’
- 2016 - ‛Dr. Jeeshampa Award’ by Karnataka Janapada Academy.
