= Shingapoore =

Coordinates: 12.626821°N 76.632700°E

Shingapoore is a small village in the Mandya district of the Indian state of Karnataka. It is located 5 km north of the Narayanapura village, near the town of Pandavapura.

== Amenities ==
Shingapoore is known for its scenery and temples. The place is used as a film production location for a number of Kannada films. Shingapoore is also known for its traditional and cultural beliefs.

== See also ==
- Narayanapura
- Kere Thonnuru
- Pandavapura

== Image gallery ==
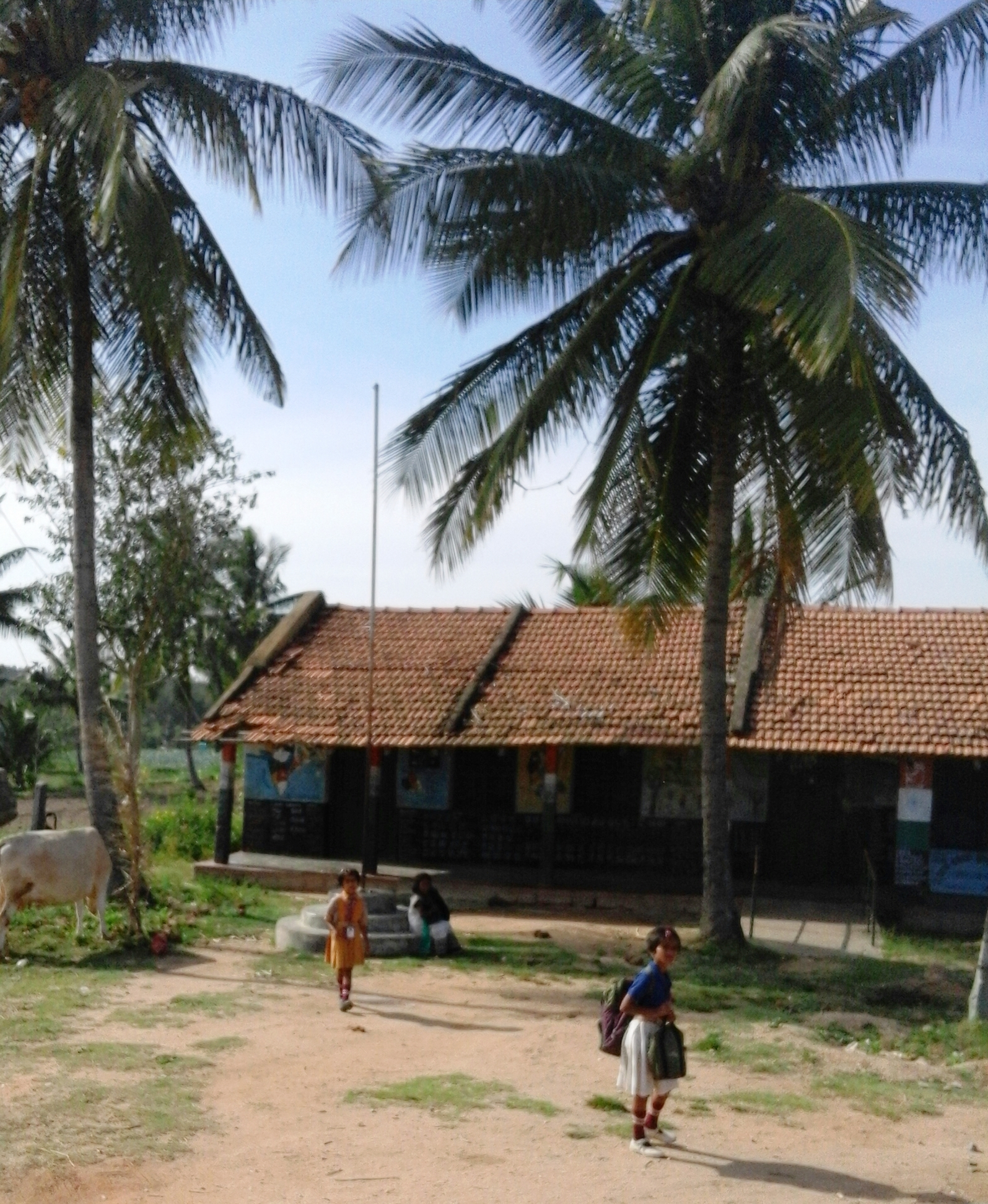
Shingapoore School

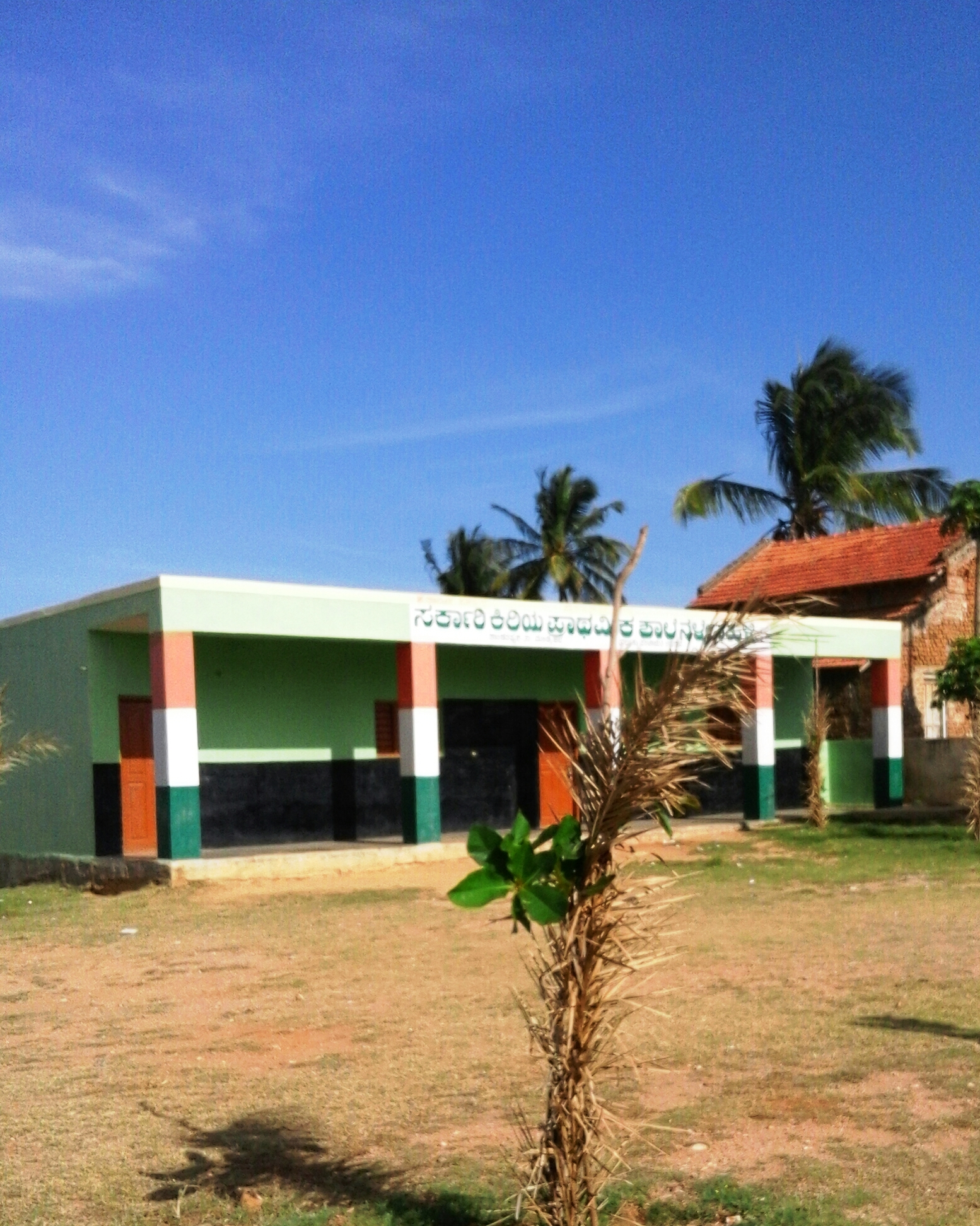
Shingapoore Nursery

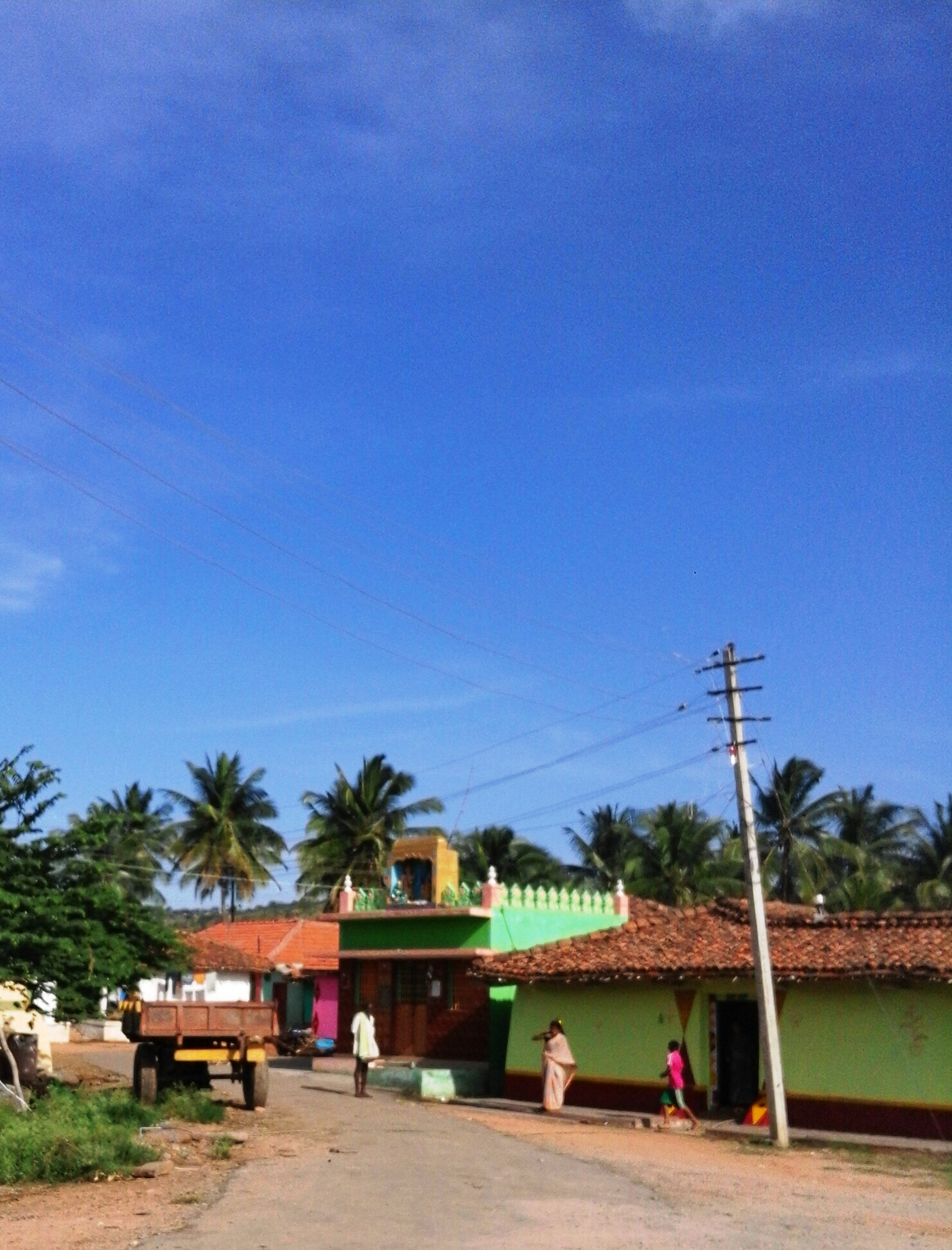
Bus stop at Shingapore

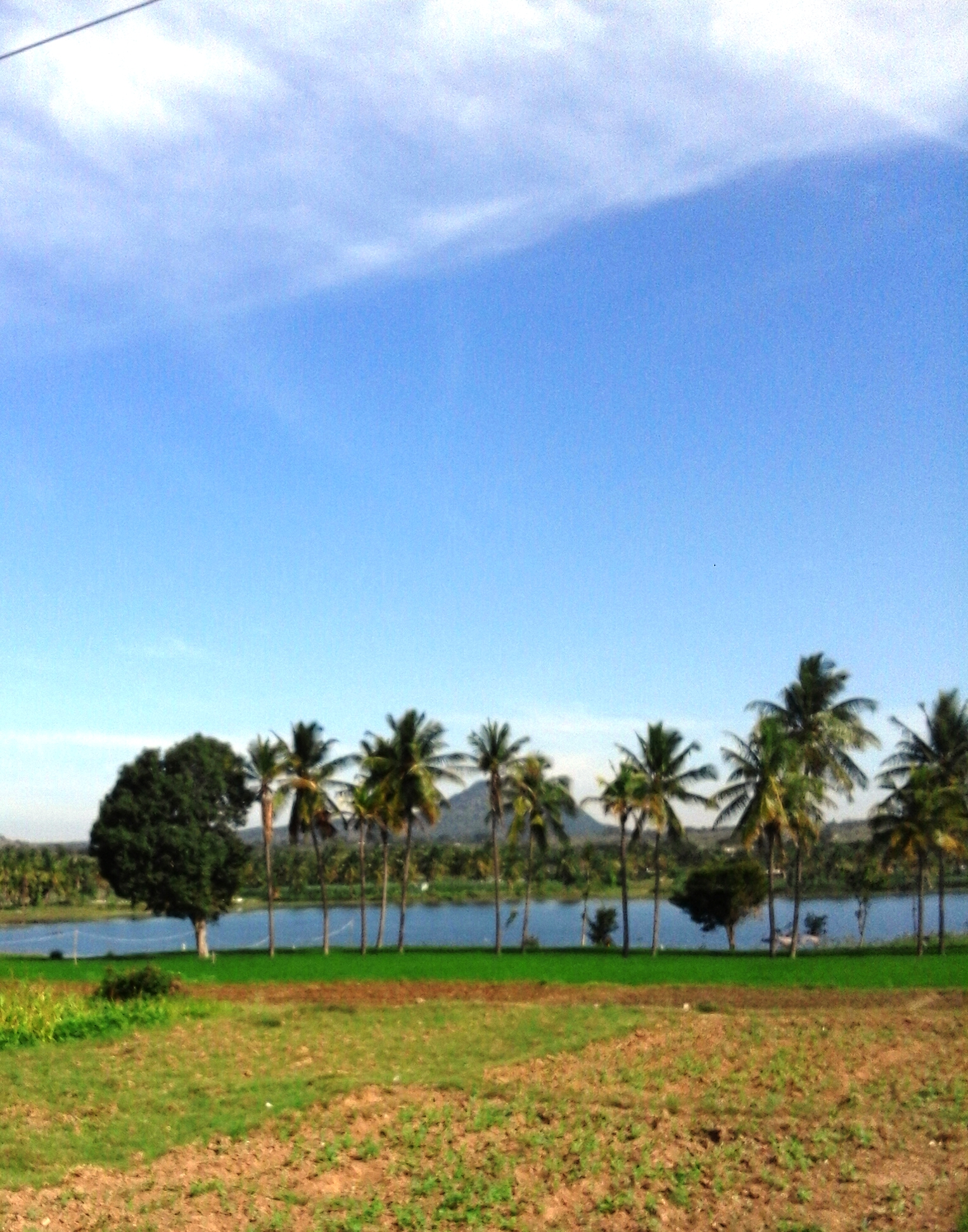
Narayanapura Lake
