= Kere Thonnur =

Village in India

Coordinates: 12.556°N 76.642°E

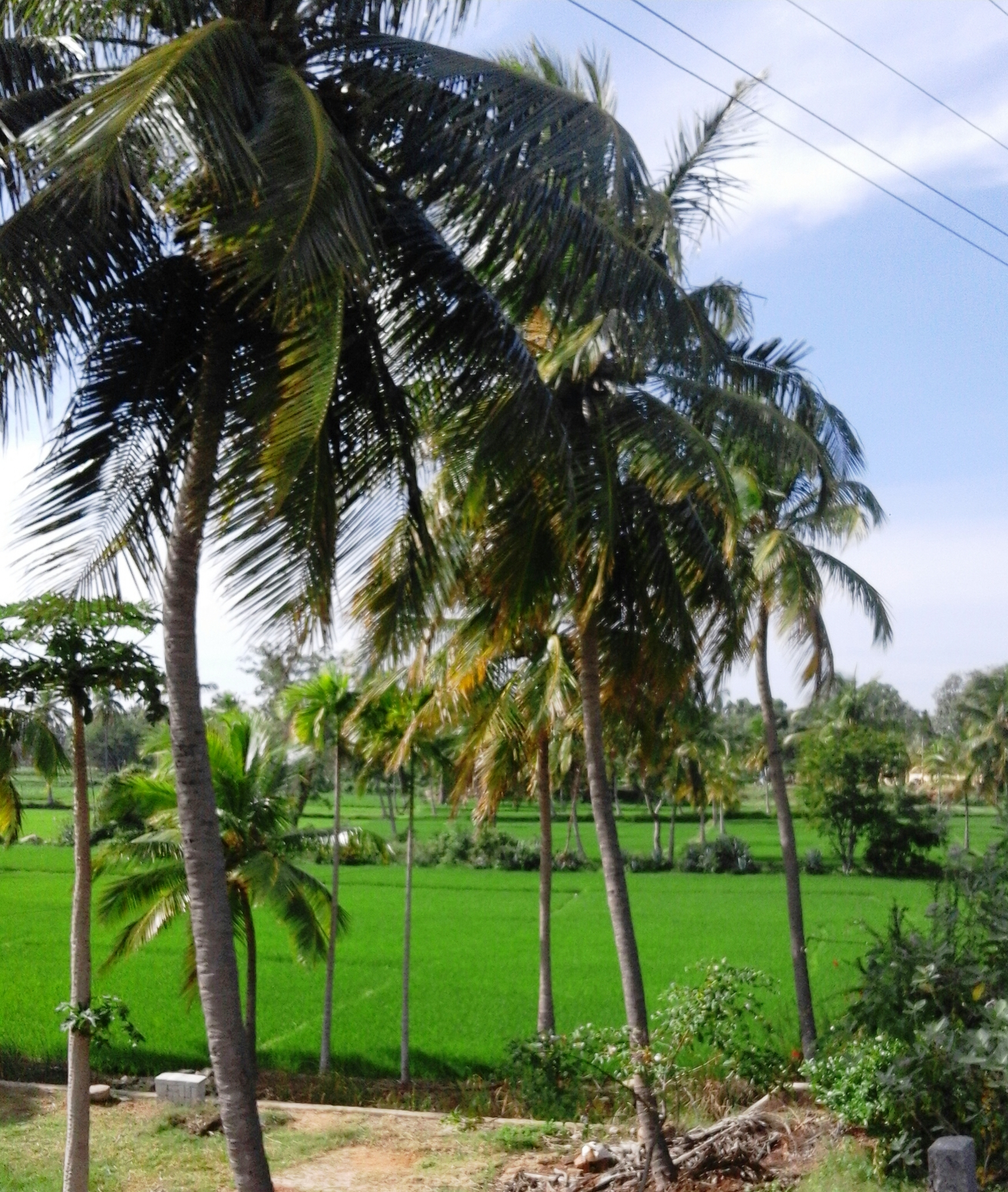
Paddy fields and Coconut palms

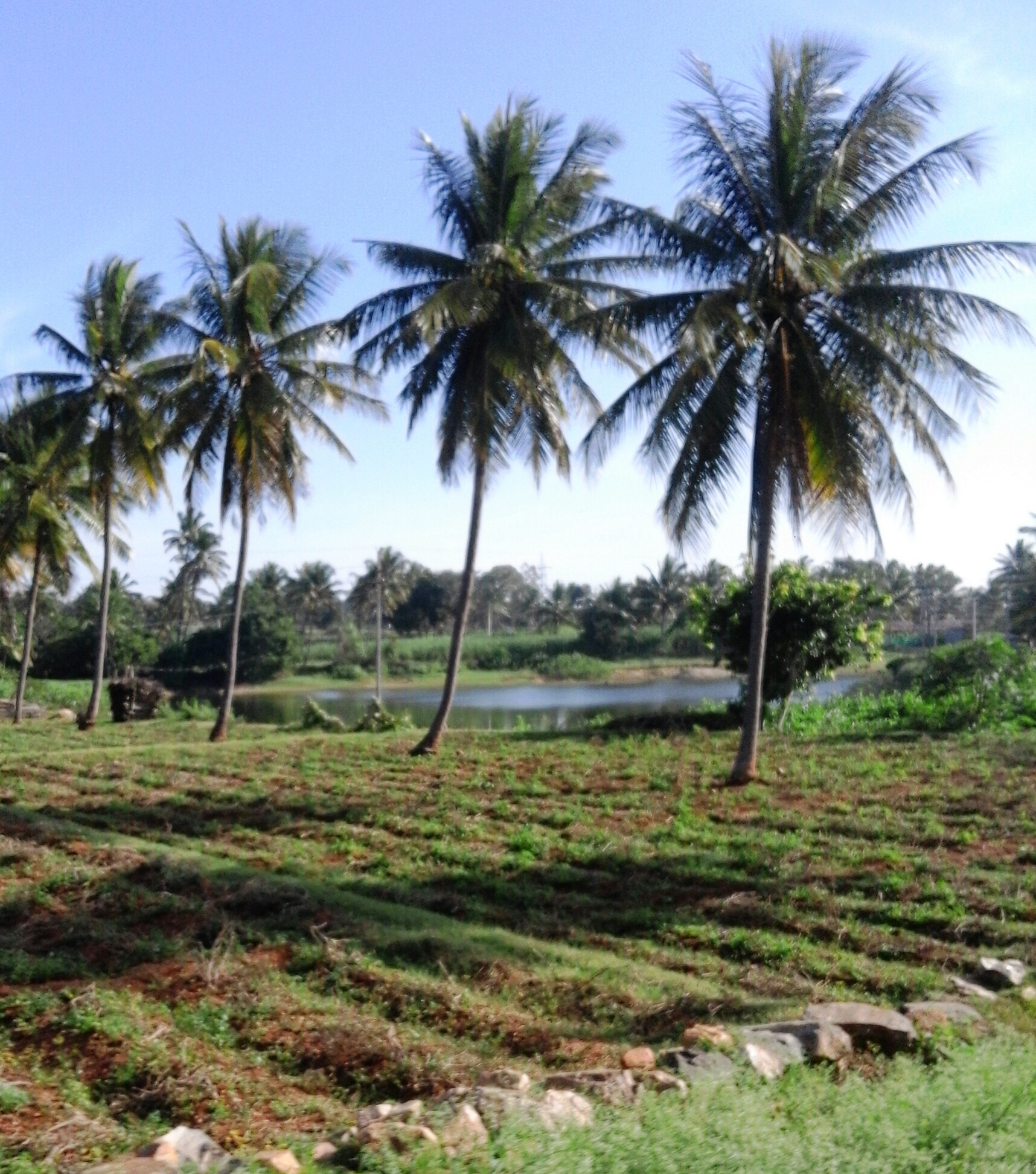
Kere Thonnur lake

Kere Thonnur is a small village in the Mandya district of Karnataka state, India.

== Location ==
Kere Thonnur is located 10.3 kilometres (6.4 mi) north of Pandavapura town on the road to Narayanapura village.

== Tourist attractions ==
Kere Thonnur is a well-known tourist spot because of its green paddy fields, ancient temples and twin lakes. Many Kannada films were shot in this village and the adjacent village of Shingapoore. Keretannur lake is famous.

== See also ==
- Narayanapura
- Shingapoore
- Pandavapura

== Image gallery ==
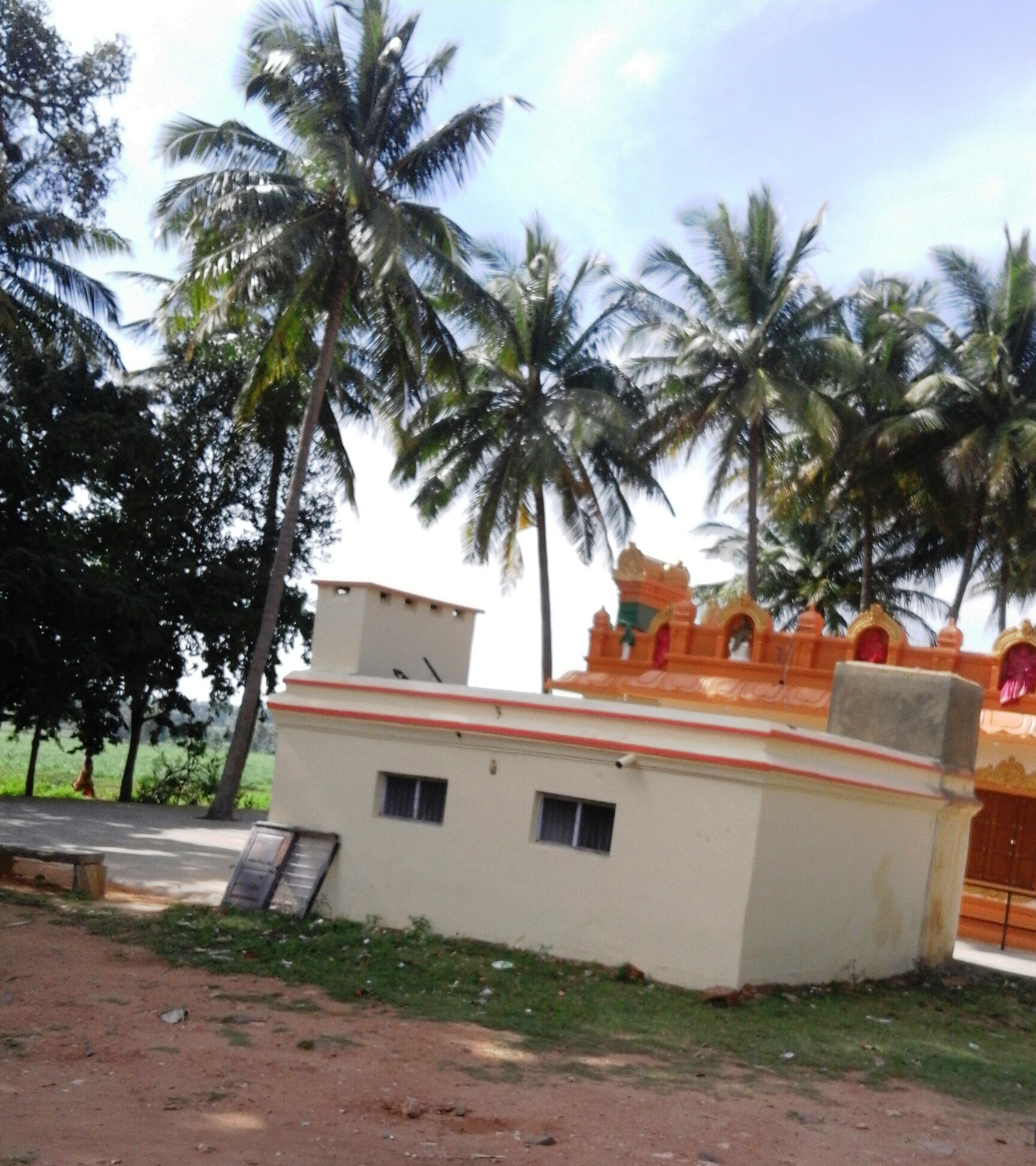
Lakeside temple

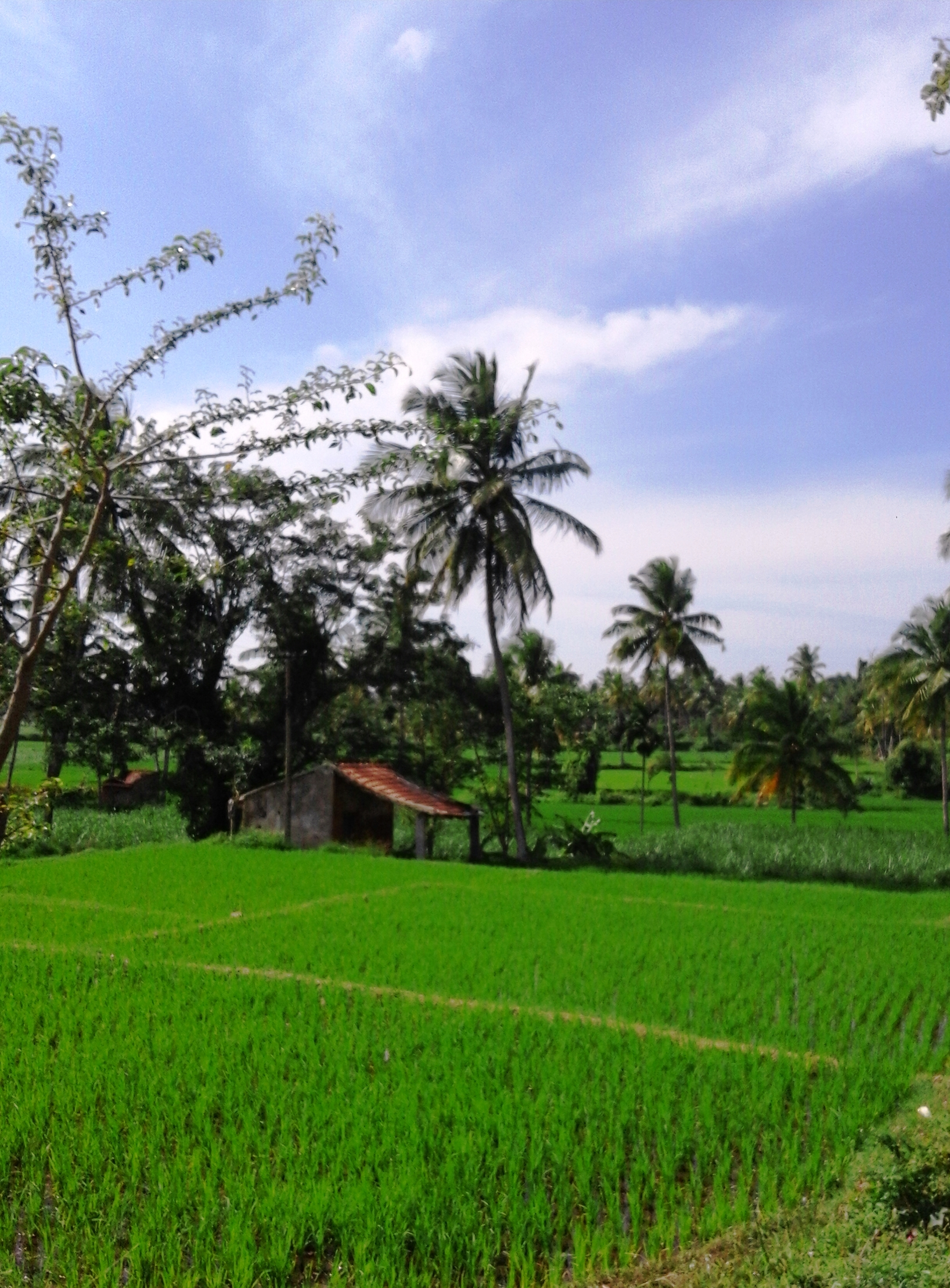
Kere Thonnur village

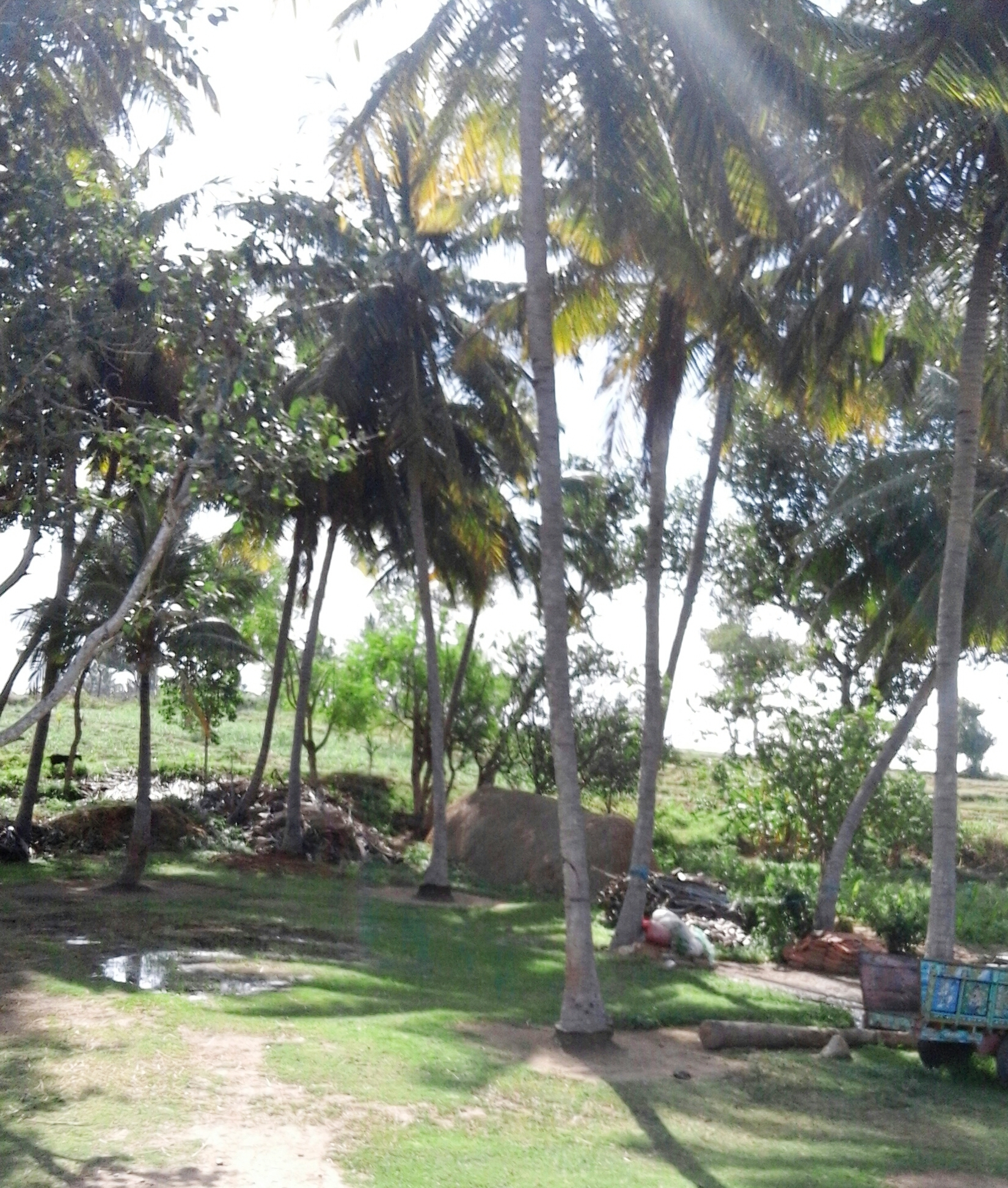
Coconut plantations

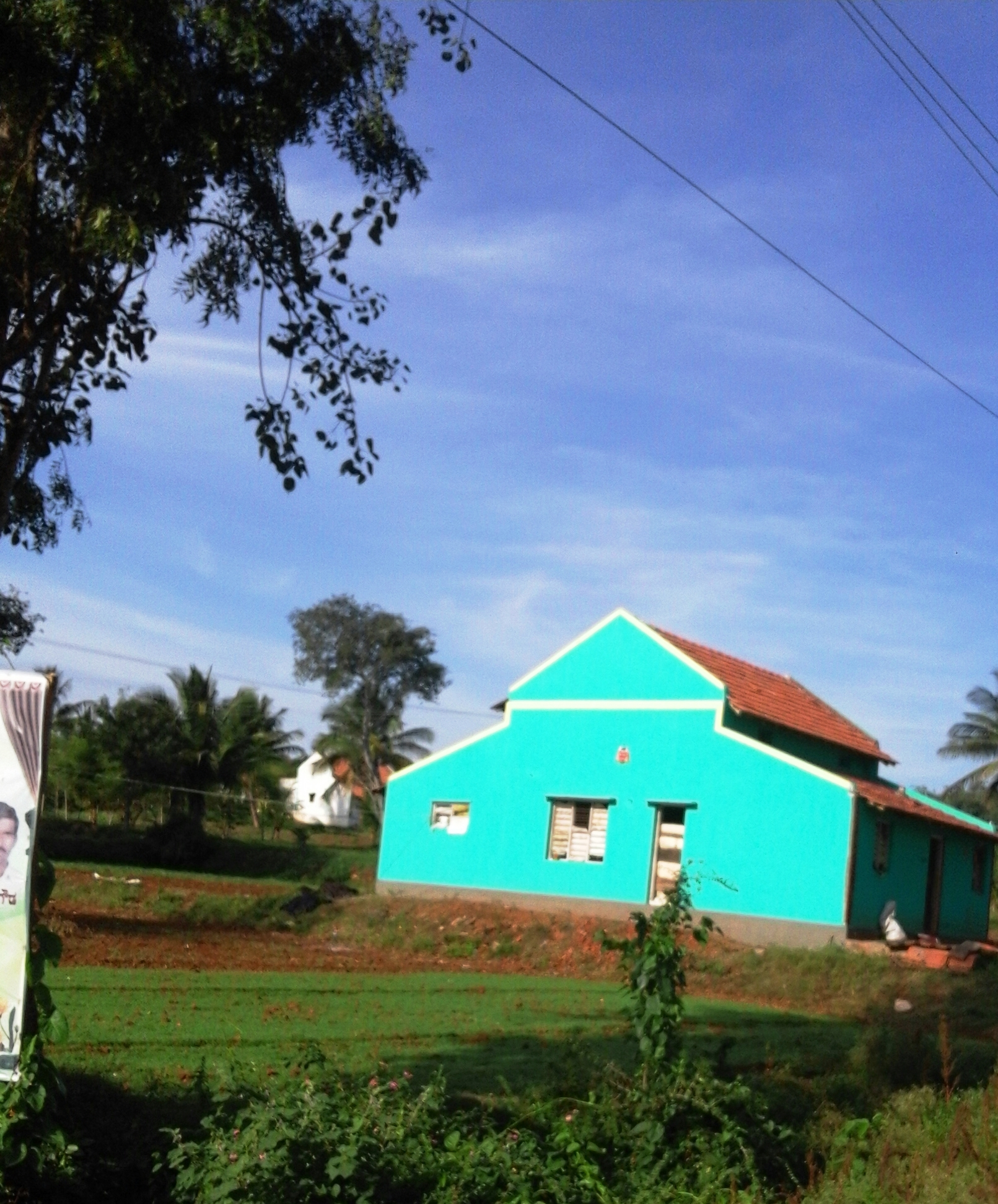
Village House

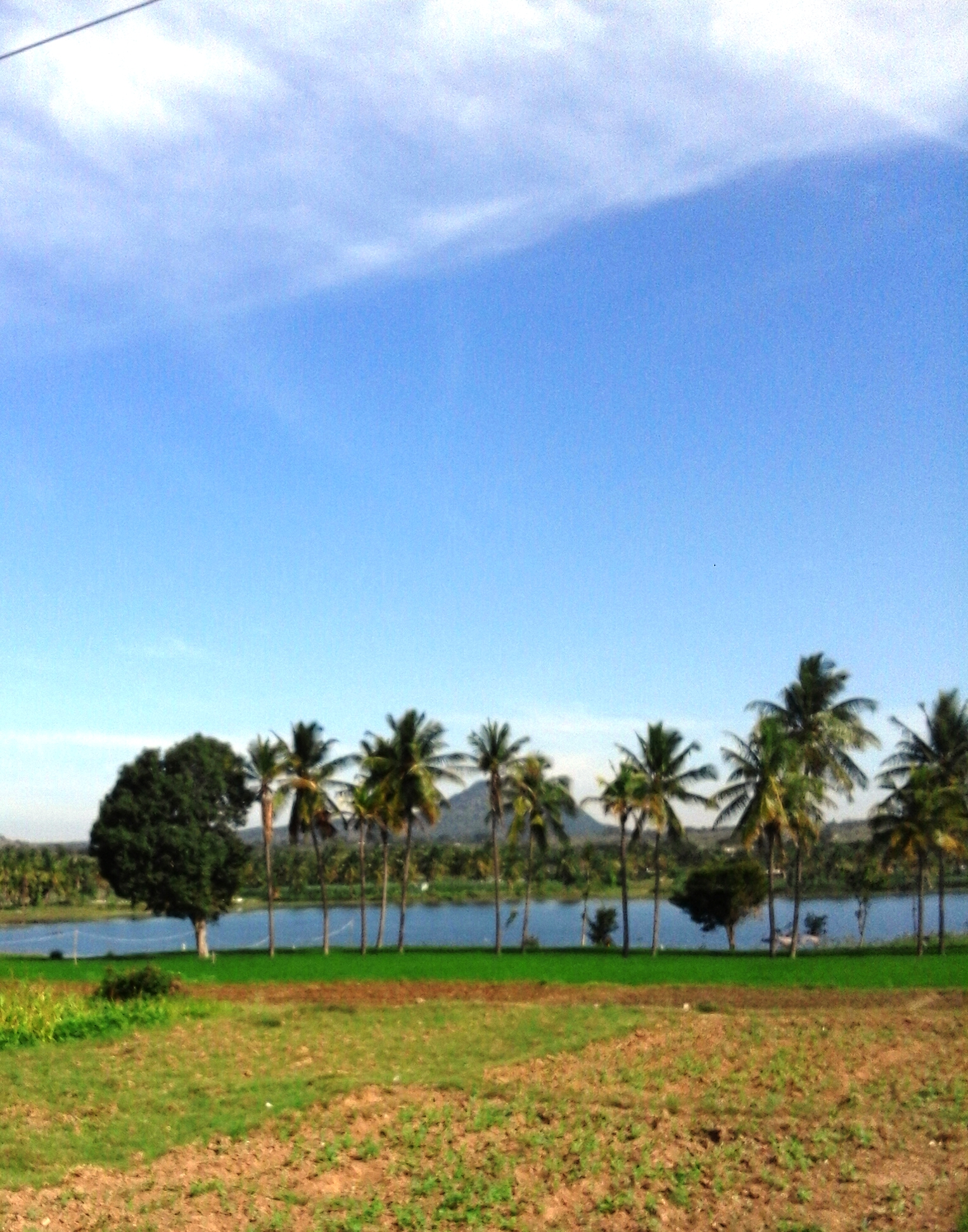
Narayanapura Lake

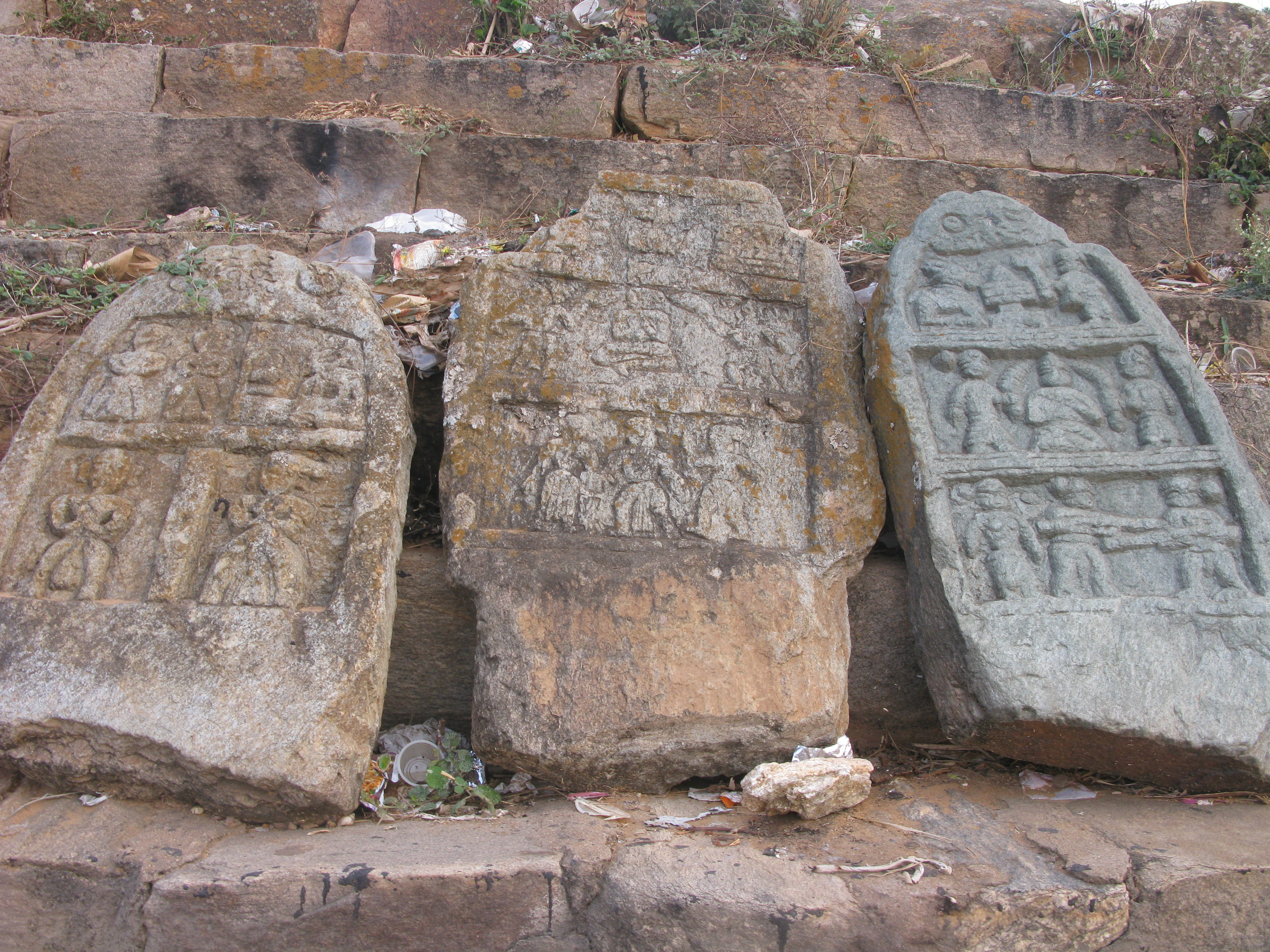
Hero Stone on bank of Thonnur Lake
