= National College, Bengaluru =

Educational institutions in Bangalore, India

National College, Bengaluru is the name given to two sister institutions in Bengaluru, India: the National College Basavanagudi, founded in 1919, and the National College, Jayanagar, founded in 1965. Other related institutions, also called National College, are located in Bagepalli (Chikkaballapur District) and Gowribidanur. These institutions are managed by the National Education Society of Karnataka (NES).

== National College (autonomous) Basavanagudi ==
National College Basavanagudi is located in Basavanagudi. It was started in the year 1920. The college was founded by Sampath Giri Rao.

Educationalist Dr. H. Narasimhaiah was the chairman of NES until his death. He also started the Bangalore Science Forum (BSF).

== National College (autonomou), Jayanagar ==
The National College in Jayanagar was started in 1965. It offers courses at both pre-university and degree levels in the arts and sciences including English, Kannada, Sanskrit, French, Hindi, physics, computer science, electronics, psychology, mathematics, chemistry, botany, and zoology.

The college is known for following Gandhian principles and was founded by educationalist H. Narasimhiah, a Gandhian himself and Padma Bhushan recipient.

The college has Dr. H.N. Kalakshetra on its premises who is linked with Bangalore Lalitha Kala Parishat. The college features the B.V. Jagadeesh Science Centre, a public institution open to anyone interested in science education, established with the hope that the younger generation will make the best use of it.

== Notable alumni ==
Notable alumni of either of the two colleges include:

- C. N. R. Rao
- Kalya Jagannath Rao
- Srikanth Sastry
- Anil Kumble
- Vishnuvardhan
- Ramesh Aravind
- Srinath
- Vinayak Joshi
- Nicole Rodrigues-Larsen
- EAS Prasanna
- Pavan Kumar
- A.S Kiran Kumar
- Srinivas BV
- BN Narayana – Makeup Nani, husband of Bhargavi Narayan
- Divya Gokulnath – Entrepreneur and Co-Founder, Byjus
- N.S. Srinivasa Murthy, Honorary Consul for The Socialist Republic Vietnam for Bengaluru (Karnataka).

== See also ==
- National High School, Basavanagudi
