= Kalya Jagannath Rao =

Indian physical chemist

- Born: 7 December 1940 (age 85); Kalya, Karnataka, India
- Education: University of Mysore; IIT Kanpur; Purdue University; Case Western Reserve University
- Known for: Studies on Nanomaterials, Amorphous Materials, Ceramics
- Awards: 1984 Shanti Swarup Bhatnagar Prize; 1993 IACS S. R. Palit Award; 1995 MRSI Materials Science Medal; 1999 INSA Prize for Materials Science; 2000 IISc Alumni Research Award; 2000 UoB1 Gold Medal for Research; 2001 CRSI Silver Medal; 2002 MRSI Distinguished Materials Scientist; 2005 ISCAS Life Time Achievement Award; 2006 Ordre des Palmes Académiques; 2007 Sir M. Visweswaraiah Award
- Scientific career
- Fields: Nanomaterials, Ceramics
- Workplaces: National College, Bangalore; National Aerospace Laboratories; Indian Institute of Science
- Doctoral advisor: C. N. R. Rao; C. A. Angell; A. R. Cooper

Kalya Jagannath Rao (born 7 December 1940), popularly known as K. J. Rao, is an Indian physical chemist and an Emeritus professor at the Indian Institute of Science. He is known for his researches on nanomaterials, amorphous Materials and ceramics and is an elected fellow of the Indian National Science Academy, National Academy of Sciences, India, International Academy of Ceramics, Asia Pacific Academy of Materials and World Innovation Foundation and the Indian Academy of Sciences. The Council of Scientific and Industrial Research, the apex agency of the Government of India for scientific research, awarded him the Shanti Swarup Bhatnagar Prize for Science and Technology, one of the highest Indian science awards, in 1984, for his contributions to chemical sciences. He is also a recipient of the Ordre des Palmes Académiques of the Government of France.

== Biography ==
University of Mysore

Jagannatha Rao, born on 7 December 1940 to Kalya Ananthamurthy and Nagamma at Kalya, a village in the south Indian state of Karnataka, passed BSc hons in 1960 from the University of Mysore and followed it up with MSc in physical chemistry from the same university in 1961. The same year, he joined National College, Bangalore as a lecturer at their chemistry department and worked there until 1964 before enrolling at IIT Kanpur for his doctoral studies under the guidance of renowned chemist, C. N. R. Rao, a Bharat Ratna laureate. He secured a PhD in 1967 and continued his post-doctoral studies under the same mentor until 1972. Moving to the US, he also worked under C. A. Angell at Purdue University and with A. R. Cooper at Case Western Reserve University. Returning to India in 1972, he joined National Aerospace Laboratories where he worked until 1978 when he became associated with the Indian Institute of Science as a professor at the Solid State and Structural Chemistry Unit. He worked at the Unit until his superannuation and post-retirement, serves as an Emeritus professor and Ramanna Senior fellow there.

Rao is married to Sudha and the couple has a child Named As Kalya Vijaya Sarathy. The family lives in Bengaluru.

== Legacy ==
Rao has been a part of several research groups; he collaborated with V. C. Veeranna Gowda and C. Narayana Reddy of Bangalore University for his studies of glasses and ceramics, with S. A. Shivashankar of Indian Institute of Science for studies of zinc oxide nanostructures and with A. Naik of Kuvempu University for investigating nanomaterials. His researches on ceramics and glasses are reported to have returned a new structural model for ionic glasses and a model for glass transition. He discovered energy efficient protocols for the preparation of many advanced ceramics. He has released his researches as four books which include Structural Chemistry of Glasses, a comprehensive text on glasses and Current Trends in the Science and Technology of Glass as well as 290 articles published in peer-reviewed journals. (Note: Please see Selected bibliography section) His work has been cited by many authors (Note: Please see Citations section) and he has mentored 24 doctoral and one post graduate student in their studies. He served as the chair of the Materials Research Centre of IISc during 1984–91 and headed the Division of Chemical Sciences from 1992 to 1997. He is one of the founders of the Indo-French Laboratory for Solid State Chemistry (IFLaSC) at IISc which would later earn him a French state honor.

== Awards and honors ==
The Council of Scientific and Industrial Research awarded Rao the Shanti Swarup Bhatnagar Prize, one of the highest Indian science awards, in 1984. He received the S. R. Palt Award of the Indian Association for the Cultivation of Science in 1993 and the Material Science Award of the Material Science Society of India (MRSI) in 1995; MRSI would honor him again in 2002 with the Distinguished Materials Scientist of the Year award. The Indian National Science Academy awarded him the Materials Science Prize in 1999 and he received two awards in 2000, the Alumni Award for Excellence in Research of the Indian Institute of Science and the gold medal for Research of the University of Bordeaux I. The Silver Medal of the Chemical Research Society of India reached him in 2002 and he received the Lifetime Achievement Award and Gold Medal of International Symposium on Circuits and Systems in 2005. He is a recipient of two state honors; the Ordre des Palmes Académiques of the Government of France (2006) and Sir M. Visweswaraiah Award of the Government of Karnataka (2007). He is an elected fellow of all the three major Indian science academies viz. Indian National Science Academy, Indian Academy of Sciences, National Academy of Sciences, India and a fellow of the International Academy of Ceramics, Asia Pacific Academy of Materials and World Innovation Foundation. He is also a recipient of honorary doctorates from the Indian Institute of Science (1988) and the University of Bordeaux 1 (2000).

== Citations ==
- C. N. R. Rao; Kanishka Biswas (20 April 2015). Essentials of Inorganic Materials Synthesis. Wiley. pp. 55–. ISBN 978-1-118-89268-8.
- M. Z. A. Munshi (1995). Handbook of Solid State Batteries & Capacitors. World Scientific. pp. 205–. ISBN 978-981-02-1794-5.
- Chintamani Nagesa Ramachandra Rao; S. K. Joshi; R. A. Mashelkar (1995). Solid State Chemistry: Selected Papers of C.N.R. Rao. World Scientific. pp. 214–. ISBN 978-981-02-1808-9.
- Chintamani Nagesa Ramachandra Rao (2008). Trends in Chemistry of Materials: Selected Research Papers of C.N.R. Rao. World Scientific. pp. 129–. ISBN 978-981-283-383-9.

== Selected bibliography ==
=== Books ===
- Rao, K. J. (2002). Structural Chemistry of Glasses. Elsevier. p. 562. ISBN 9780080439587.
- H Jain; A R Cooper; K J Rao, D Chakravorty (1 September 1989). Current Trends in the Science and Technology of Glass: Proceedings of the Indo–US Workshop. World Scientific. pp. 157–. ISBN 978-981-4663-28-1.

=== Articles ===
- Rao, K. J.; Kumar, Sundeep (2003). "Multialkali phosphate glasses: a new window to understand the mechanism of ion transport". Current Science. 85 (7): 945–955. ISSN 0011-3891.
- Kumar, Sundeep; Vinatier, Philippe; Levasseur, Alain; Rao, K. J. (2004). "Investigations of structure and transport in lithium and silver borophosphate glasses". Journal of Solid State Chemistry. 177 (4–5): 1723–1737. Bibcode:2004JSSCh.177.1723K. doi:10.1016/j.jssc.2003.12.034.
- Rao, K. J.; Mahesh, Krishnamurthy; Kumar, Sundeep (2005). "A strategic approach for preparation of oxide nanomaterials". Bulletin of Materials Science. 25 (1): 19–24. doi:10.1007/BF02711166. ISSN 0250-4707. S2CID 17231730.
- Rao, K. J.; Pecquenard, B.; Gies, A.; Levasseur, A.; Etourneau, J. (2006). "Structural and electrochemical behaviour of sputtered vanadium oxide films: oxygen non-stoichiometry and lithium ion sequestration". Bulletin of Materials Science. 29 (5): 535–546. doi:10.1007/BF02914086. ISSN 0250-4707. S2CID 41539504.
- Veeranna Gowda, V. C.; Narayana Reddy, C.; Radha, K. C.; Anavekar, R. V.; Etourneau, J.; Rao, K. J. (2007). "Structural investigations of sodium diborate glasses containing PbO, Bi2O3 and TeO2: elastic property measurements and spectroscopic studies" (PDF). Journal of Non-Crystalline Solids. 353 (11–12): 1150–1163. Bibcode:2007JNCS..353.1150V. doi:10.1016/j.jnoncrysol.2006.12.117.

== See also ==
- C. N. R. Rao
