= Hale Upparahalli =

Village in Karnataka, India

- Village
- Location in Karnataka, India Hale Upparahalli (India)
- Coordinates: 13.5778531°N 77.4426161°E
- Country: India
- State: Karnataka
- District: Chikkaballapura
- Talukas: Gauribidanur
- Elevation: 684 m (2,244 ft)

Population (2011)
  - Total: 1,227

Languages
  - Official: Kannada
- Time zone: UTC+5:30 (IST)
- PIN: 561210
- Telephone code: 08155
- Vehicle registration: KA 64
- Lok Sabha constituency: Chikballapur (Lok Sabha constituency)

Hale Upparahalli is a village in the southern state of Karnataka, India. It is located in the Gauribidanur taluk of Chikkaballapura district in Karnataka. It is situated 12 km away from sub-district headquarter Gauribidanur and 44 km away from district headquarter Chikkaballapura.

== Demographics ==
According to Census 2011 information the location code or village code of Hale Upparahalli village is 623216. Hale Upparahalli village belongs to Mudugere gram panchayat.

The total geographical area of village is 333.94 hectares. Hale Upparahalli has a total population of 1,227 peoples with 607 males and 620 females. There are about 321 houses in Hale Upparahalli village. Gauribidanur is nearest town to Hale Upparahalli which is approximately 12 km away.

== Economy ==
People belonging to the Hale Upparahalli village grow very much maize, millet silk, etc. The major occupations of the residents of Hale Upparahalli are sericulture and dairy farming. The dairy cooperative is the largest individual milk supplying cooperative in the state.

Some of the flowers are also grew and sold such has winter jasmine, marigold, Crossandra infundibuliformis, Chrysanthemum, Tuberose etc.

== Facilities ==
Hale Upparahalli has below types of facilities.

- Government higher primary School
- Hale Upparahalli KMF (Karnataka Milk Federation) Dairy

== Temples ==
- Dharmamma Temple
- Lakshmi Narasimha Swamy Temple
- Ram mandir
- Hanuman temple (under construction)
