= Narayanapura =

Village in Karnataka, India

Coordinates: 12.604267°N 76.618265°E

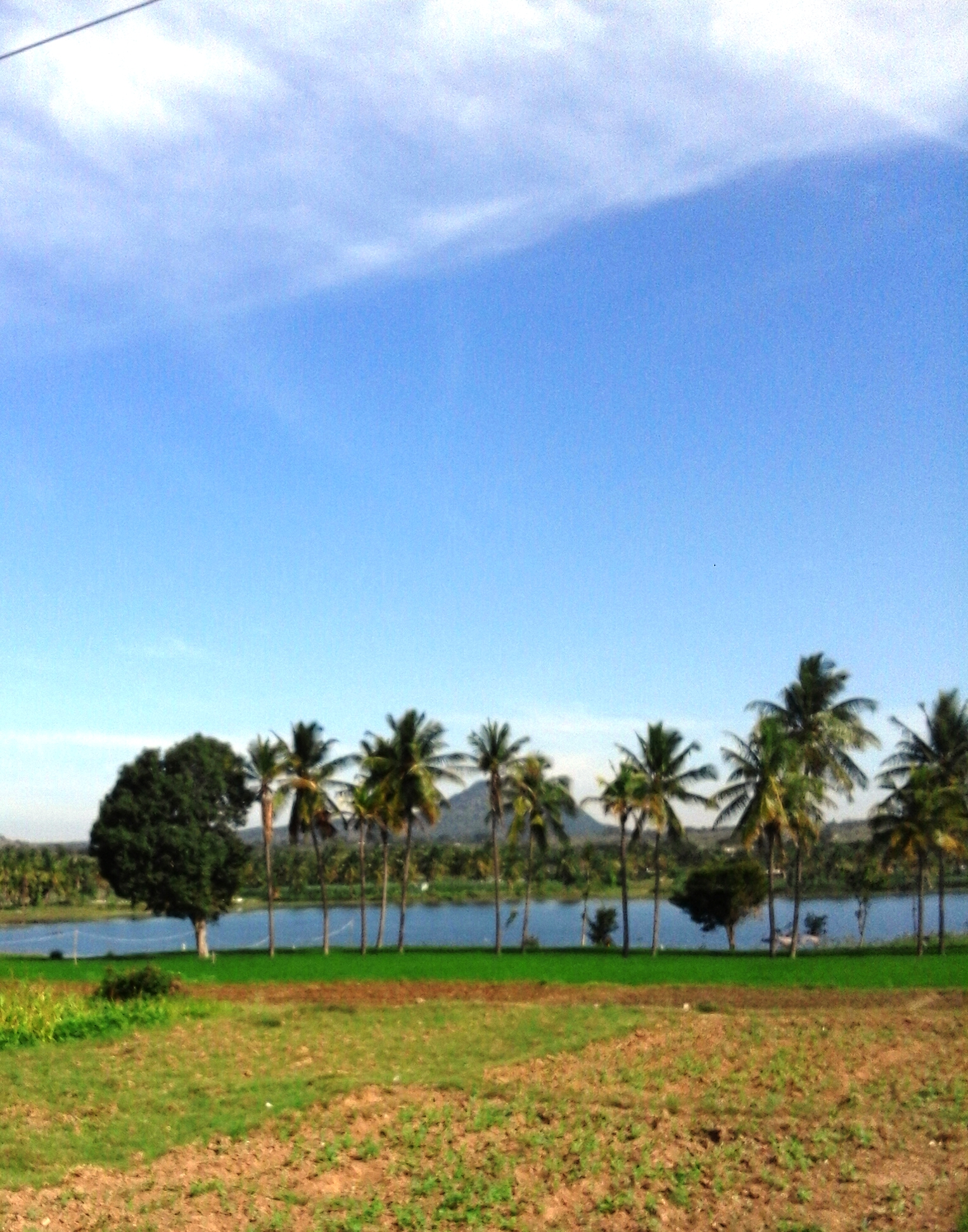
Narayanapura Lake

Narayanapura is a small village in Mandya district of Karnataka state, India. Narayanapura is located 18.7 km (11.6 mi) north of Pandavapura town near Mysore city.

== Touriss ==
Narayanapura is known for its temples and natural scenery. Kere Thonnooru and Shingapooru are two villages where many Kannada films were shot.

== Gallery ==
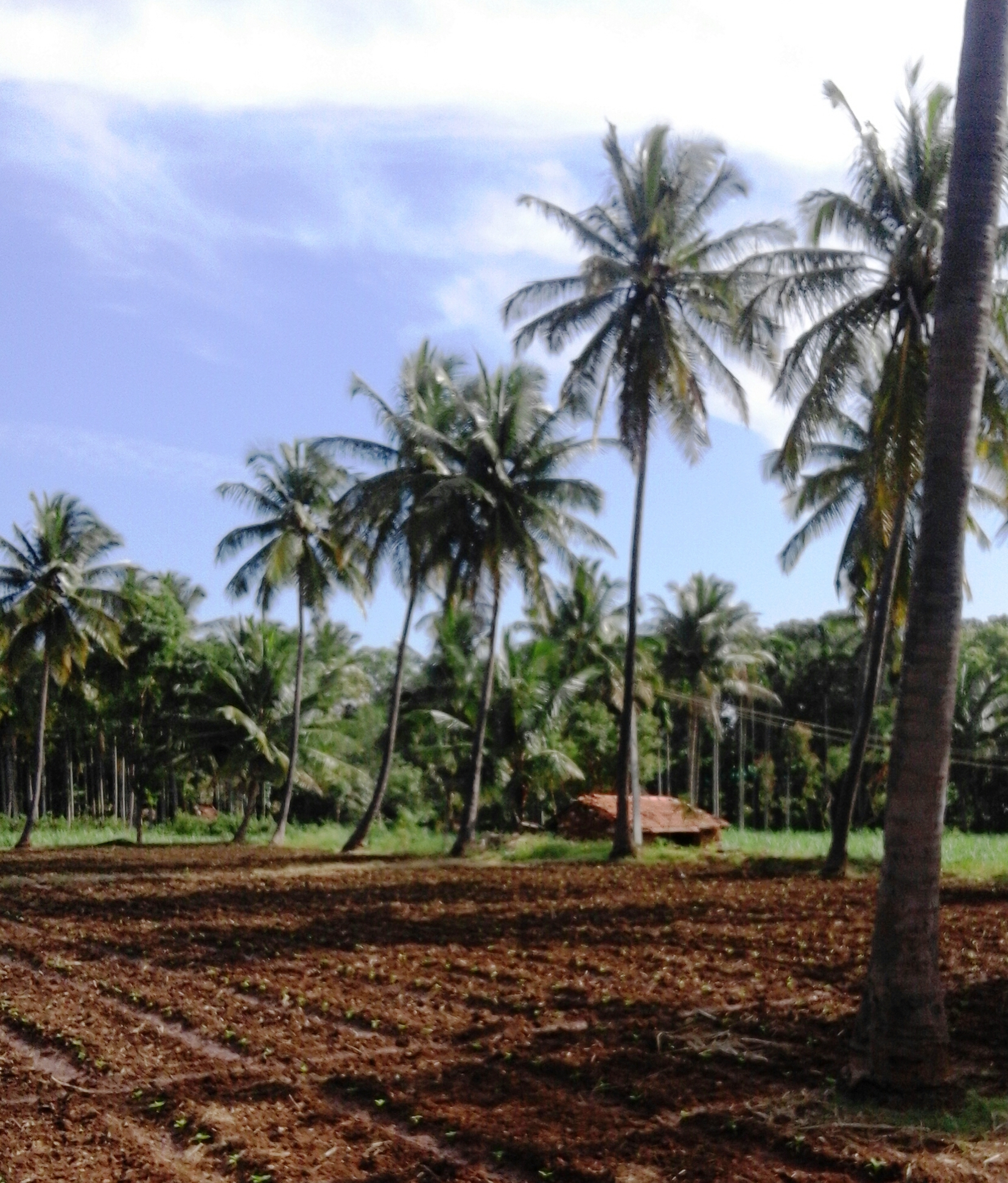
Vadala village

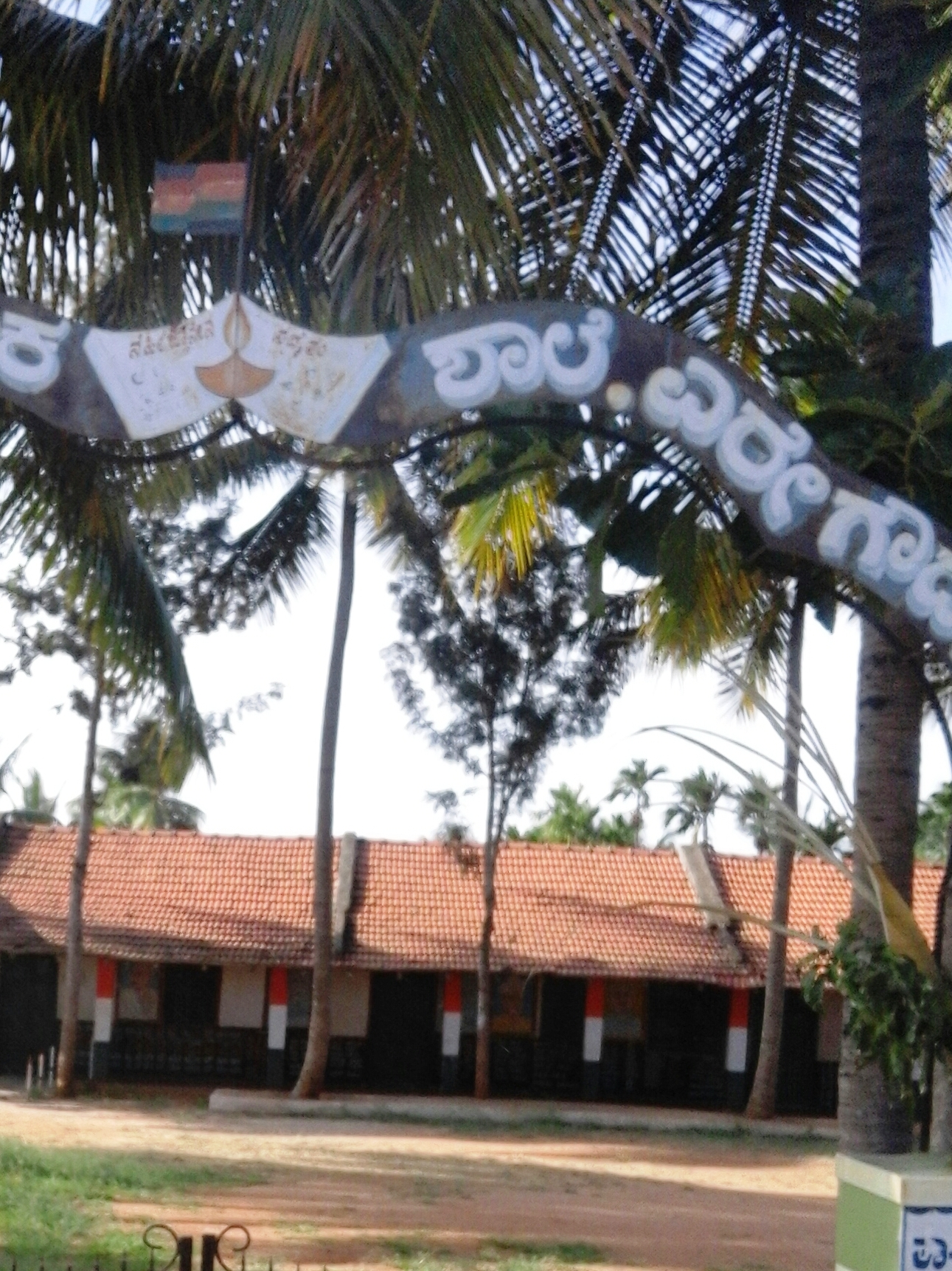
Narayanapura School

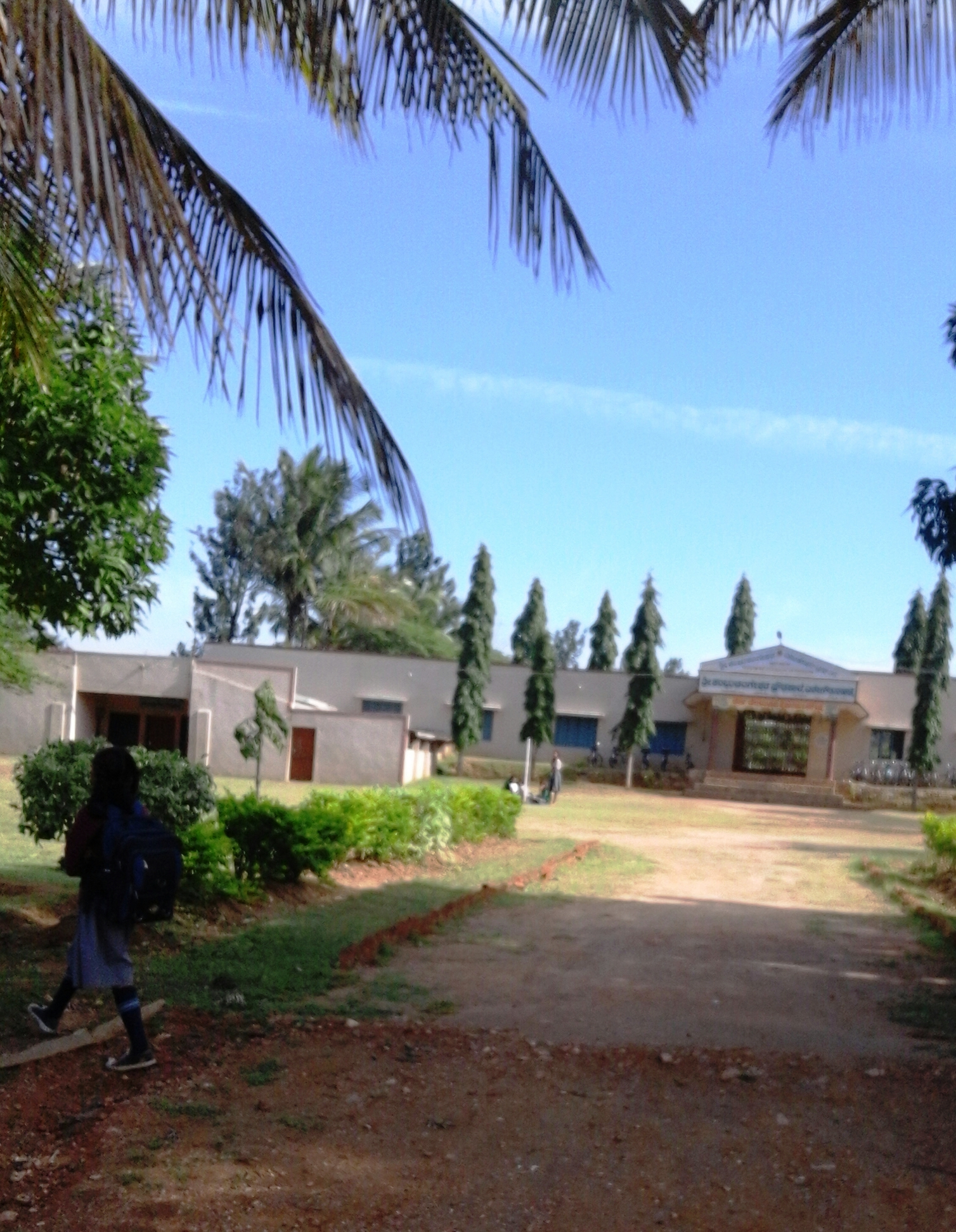
Highschool

== See also ==
- Kere Thonnuru
- Shingapoore
- Pandavapura
