= Mudugere, Gauribidanur =

Village in Chickballpur District

Mudugere
- village
- Location in Karnataka, India Mudugere (India)
- Coordinates: 13.5819025°N 77.4259302°E
- Country: India
- State: Karnataka
- District: Chikkaballapura
- Talukas: Gauribidanur
- Elevation: 686 m (2,251 ft)

Population (2011)
  - Total: 2,490

Languages
  - Official: Kannada, Telugu
- Time zone: UTC+5:30 (IST)
- PIN: 561210
- Telephone code: 08155
- Vehicle registration: KA 40
- Lok Sabha constituency: Chikballapur (Lok Sabha constituency)

Mudugere also known as Mudigere is a village in the southern state of Karnataka, India. It is located in the Gauribidanur taluk of Chikkaballapura district in Karnataka. It is situated 7 km away from sub-district headquarter Gauribidanur and 45 km away from district headquarter Chikkaballapura

== Demographics ==
According to Census 2011 information the location code or village code of Mudugere village is 623208. As per 2009 stats, Mudugere village is also a gram panchayat, it contains five villages under Mudugere Gram Panchayat.

The total geographical area of village is 537.52 hectares. Mudugere has a total population of 2,490 peoples with 1,249 males and 1,241 females. There are about 633 houses in Mudugere village. Gauribidanur is nearest town to Mudugere which is approximately 7 km away.

== Facilities ==
Mudugere has below types of facilities.

- Government higher primary School – The school is owned by government of Karnataka, located in Mudugere itself.
- Mudugere Gram panchayat office (mandal office)
- Mudugere KMF (Karnataka Milk Federation) Dairy
- Government grocery store – Owned by government of Karnataka.
- Indian Oil Petrol Pump
- National Highway-206 – Connects Gauribidanur and Madhugiri.
- library

== Temples ==
- Sri Chennakeshava Temple
- Yasinsha Wali and Mehboobshawali Dargha
- Hanuman Temple
- Shiva Temple
- Suppalamma Temple
- Mosque
