= Pandavapura =

- Town
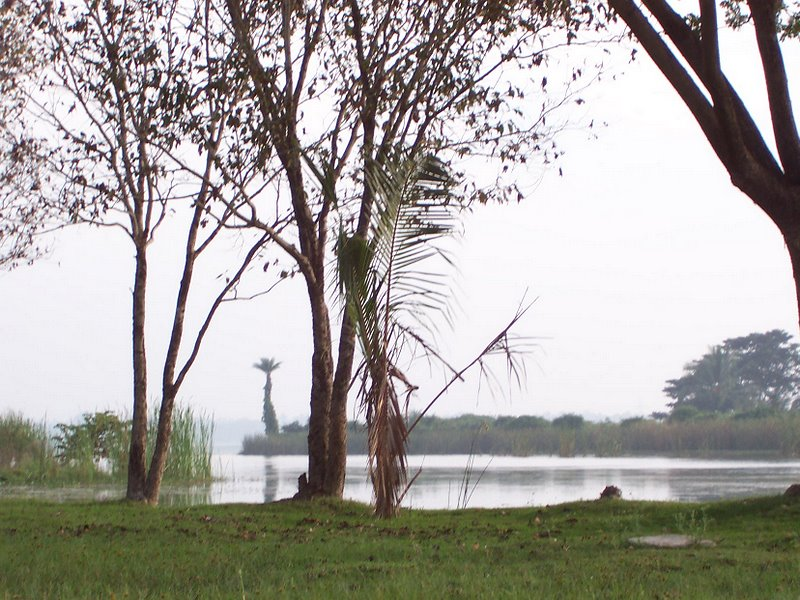
- Pandavapura Lake
- Interactive map of Pandavapura
- Coordinates: 12.5°N 76.67°E
- Country: India
- State: Karnataka
- District: Mandya

Government
  - Body: Town Municipal Council

Area
  - Town: 3.68 km^{2} (1.42 sq mi)
  - Rural: 524 km^{2} (202 sq mi)

Population (2011)
  - Town: 20,399
  - Density: 5,540/km^{2} (14,400/sq mi)
  - Rural: 162,953

Languages
  - Official: Kannada
- Time zone: UTC+5:30 (IST)
- PIN: 571434, 571435(R.S)
- Vehicle registration: KA-54 & KA-11
- Website: www.pandavapuratown.mrc.gov.in

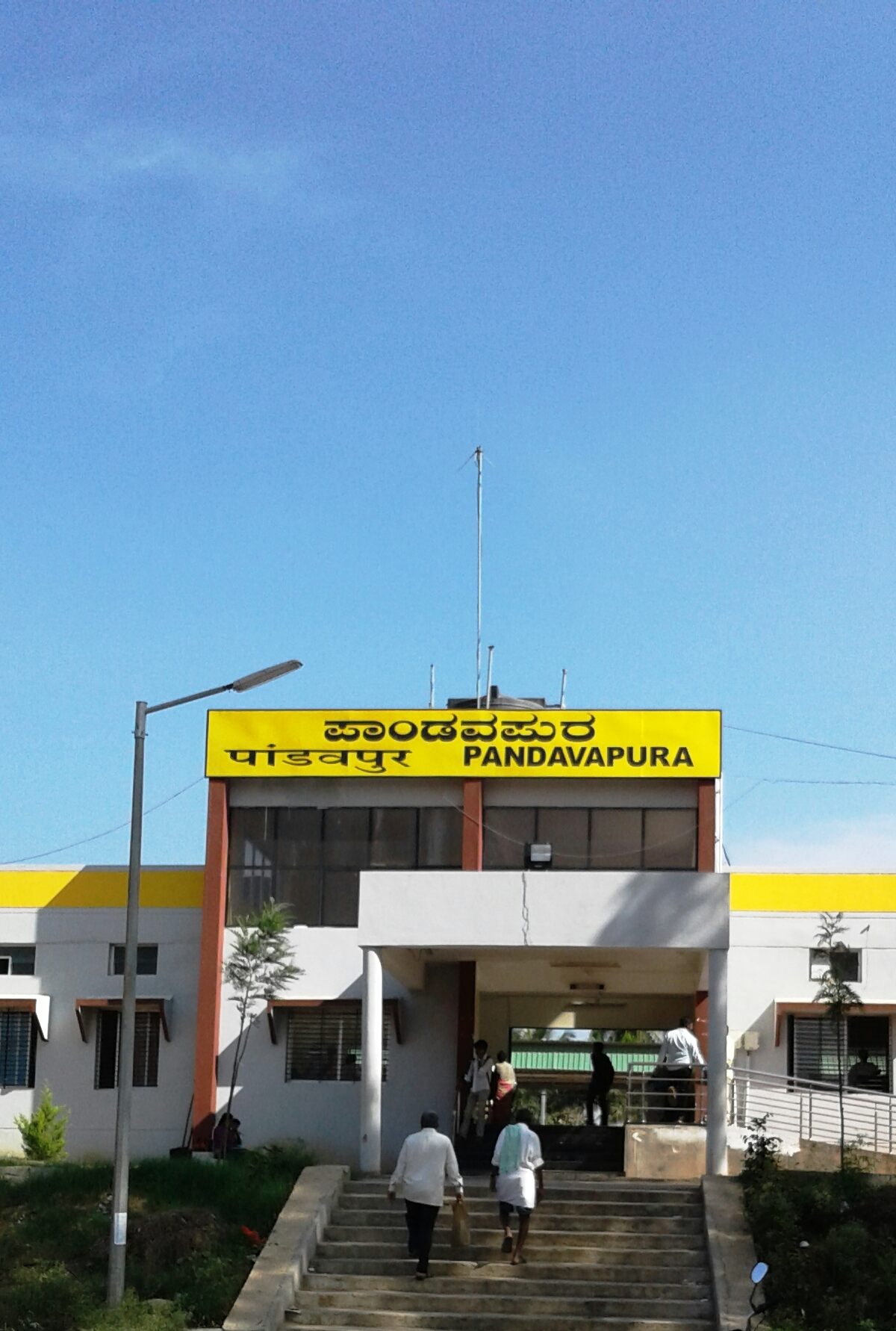
Railway Station

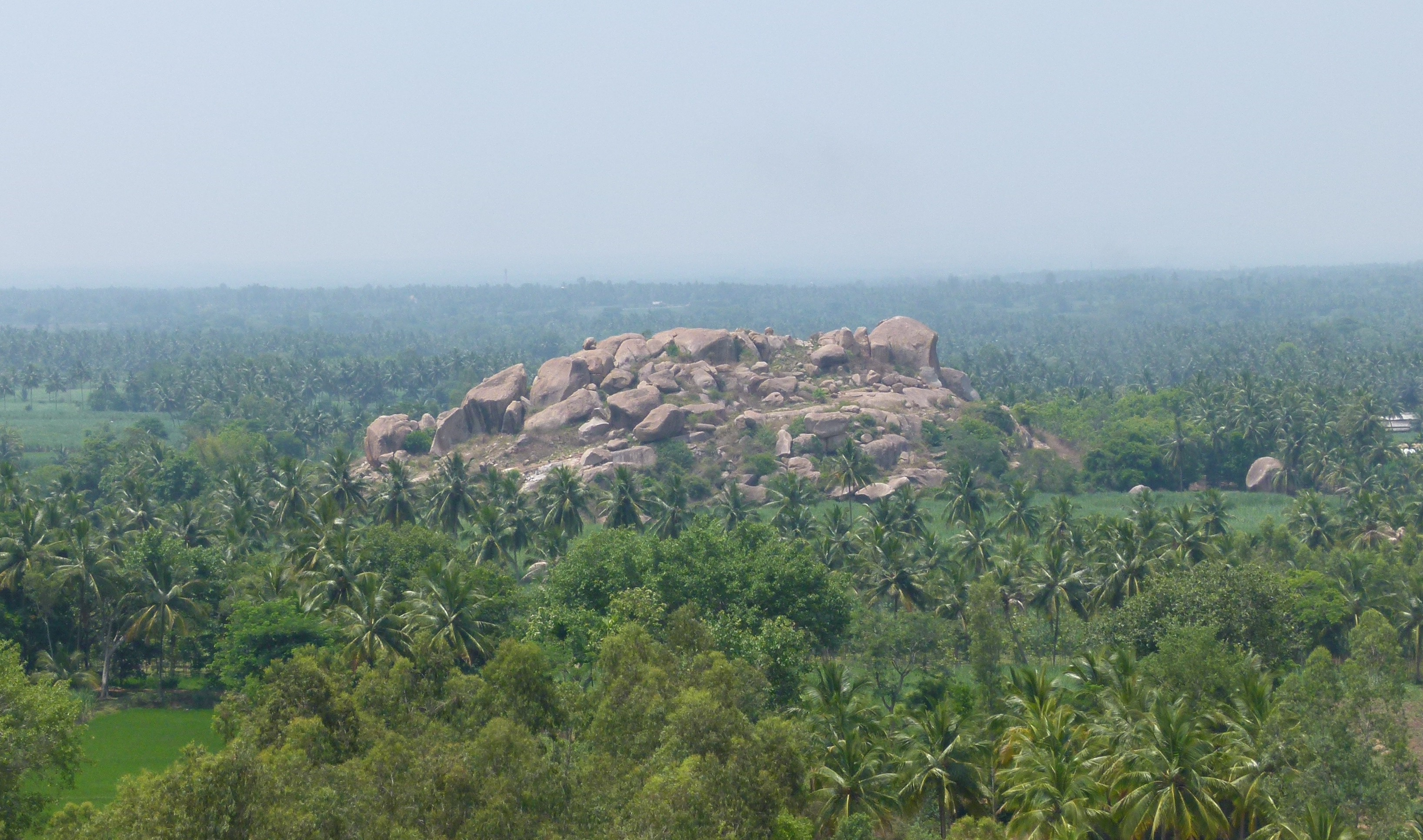
Kunthibetta

Pāndavapura is a Municipality Town, taluk in Mandya district in the Indian state of Karnataka.

== Geography ==
Pandavapura is located at 12.5°N 76.67°E. It has an average elevation of 709 metres (2326 feet).

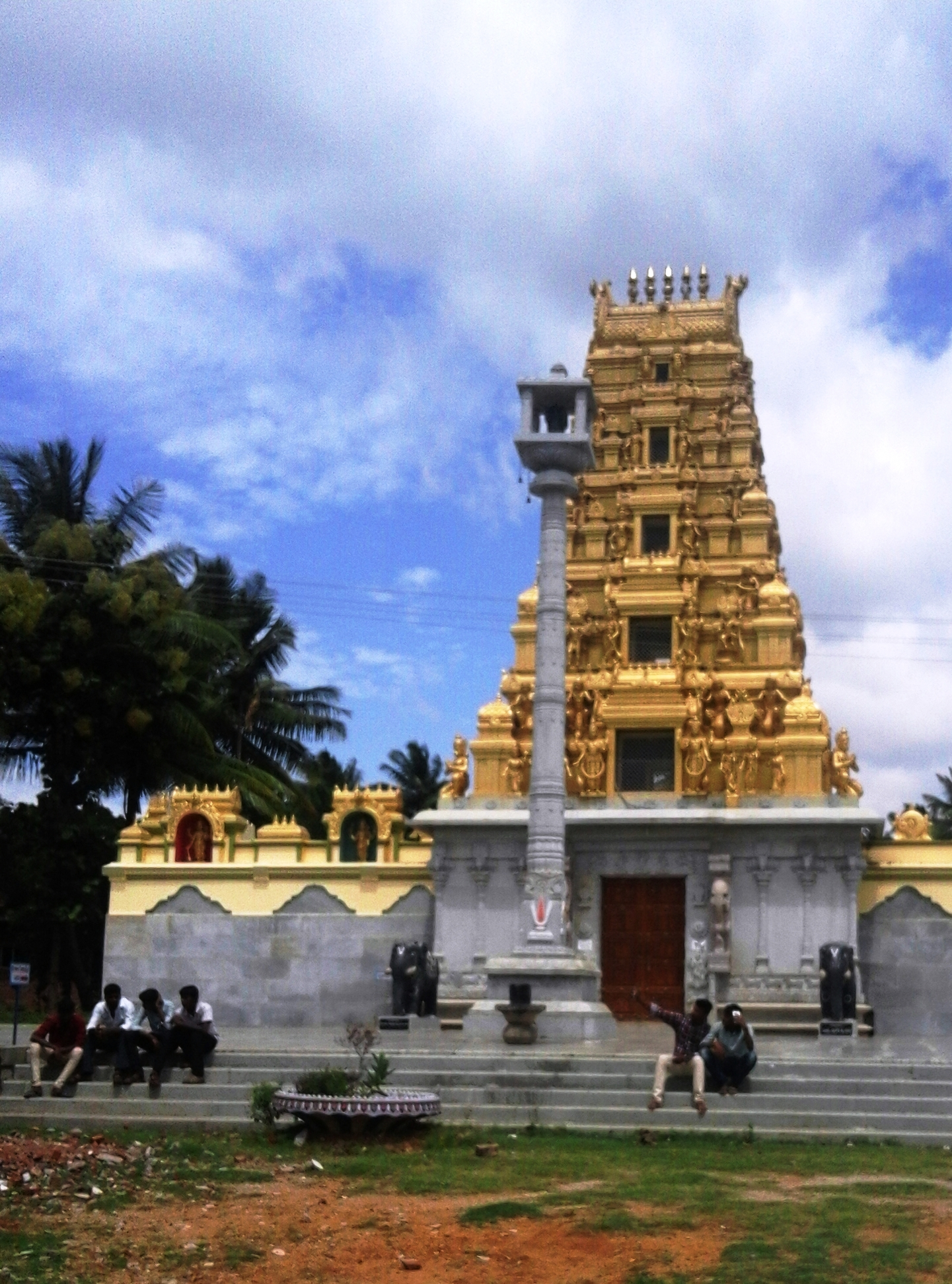
Pandavapura temple

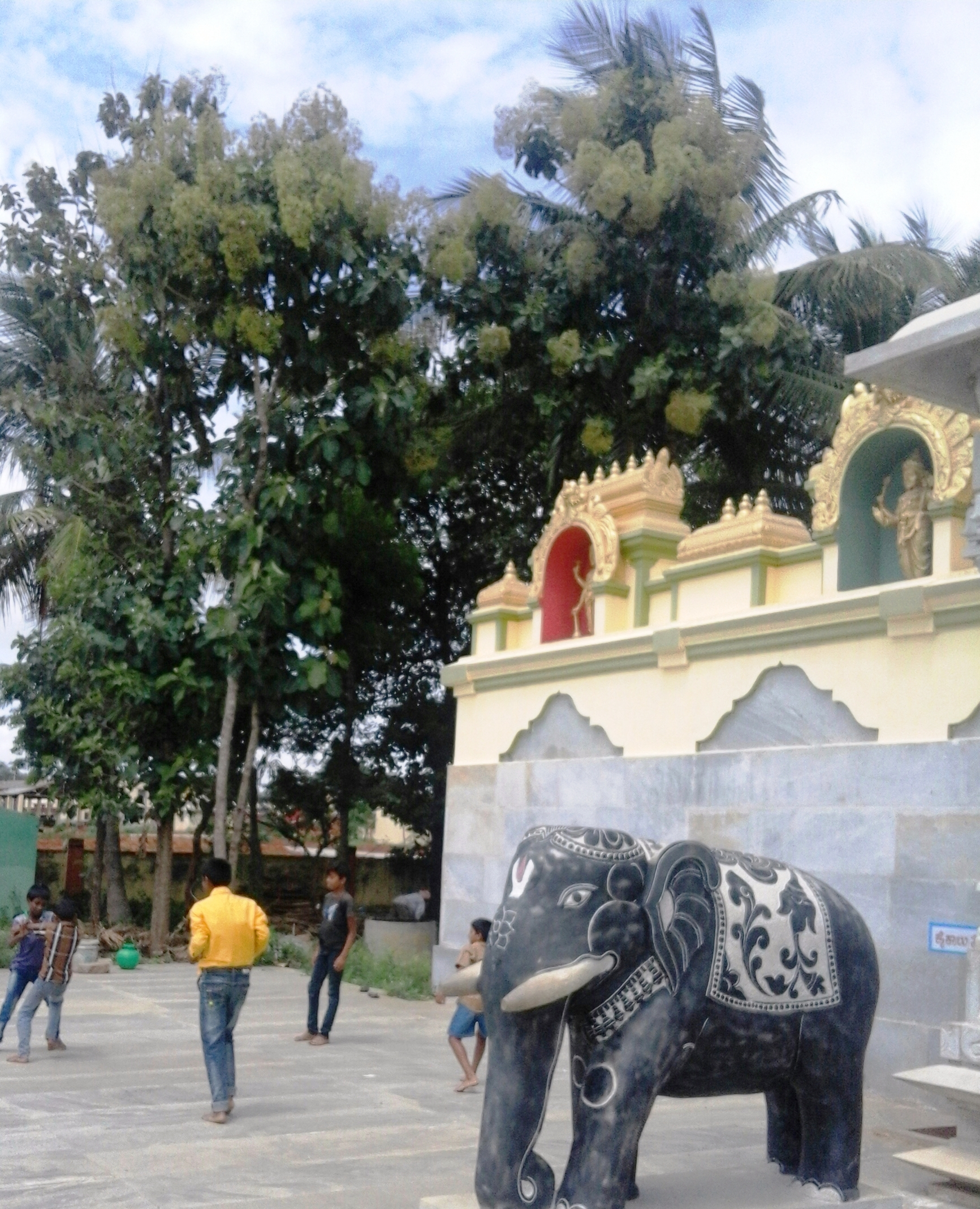
Lakshmi Narayanaswamy Riverside Temple, Harohalli

== Demographics ==
As of 2001 India census, Pandavapura had a population of 18,236. Males constitute 51% of the population and females 49%. Pandavapura has an average literacy rate of 67%, higher than the national average of 59.5%: male literacy is 72%, and female literacy is 62%. In Pandavapura, 12% of the population is under 6 years of age.

== History ==
The name Pandavapura means "Town of Pandavas". Puranas states that the Pandavas during their period of exile stayed here for some time, and Kunti, mother of the Pandavas, liked the hillock so much that it became one of her favorite haunts. The town is also named after the Pandavas because of their brief stay in this region. The name "French Rock" dates back to India's Pre-Independence days, the place was used as the camping ground by the French army, which came to help Tippu Sultan in his war against the British. It is believed that French named the small town as "French Rocks", as the town is in the vicinity of two rocky hills. After Indian Independence, these rocky hills called as "Kunti Betta" by locals. There was another smaller hill called "Kauravara betta" on the western side of the town which has been mined out of existence for its stones. Pandavapura is approximately 130 km from Bangalore and 25 km from Mysore.

== Transport ==
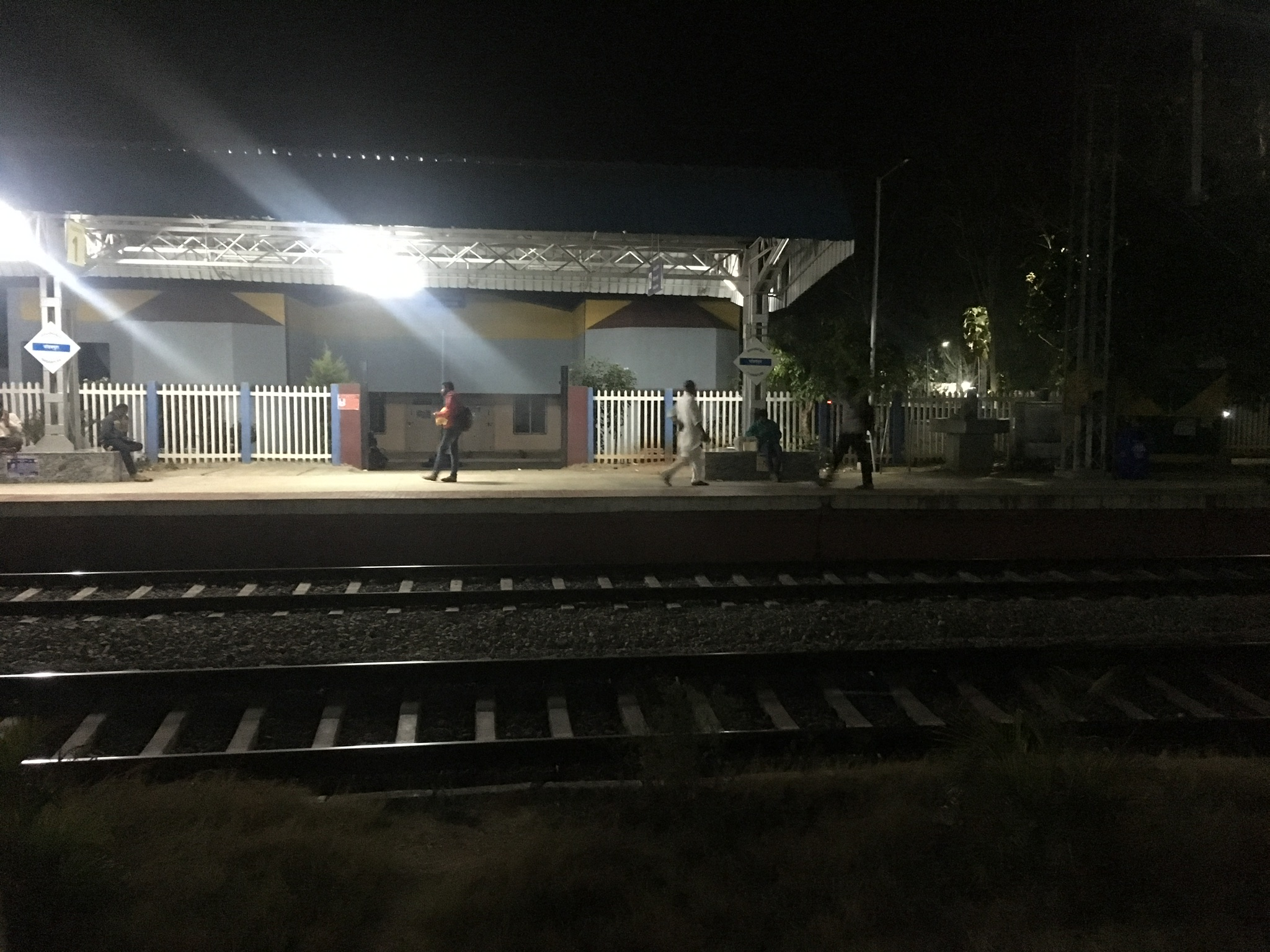
Pandavapura railway station

Pandavapura is well connected by trains and buses. Most of the trains which run between Bengaluru and Mysuru have a stoppage in Pandavapura. The Pandavapura railway station (Station Code:PANP) is 4 km away from the town. There are a few direct buses (both KSRTC & private) that ply between Bengaluru and Pandavapura. KSRTC also has a bus depot in Pandavapura, under Mandya division.

== Tourism ==
Pandavapura town is surrounded by well-known tourist spots.

- Melukote
- Krishnaraja Sagar
- Kunthi betta
- Kere Thonnur

== Notable people ==
- H. R. Shastry - veteran actor in Kannada, was born in Halebeedu village
- Vijaya Narasimha - noted lyricist in the Kannada Film Industry, was born in Halebeedu village
- Jayalakshmi Seethapura - noted writer, folklorist; born in Seethapura village
- K. S. Puttannaiah - Leader and politician
- C. S. Puttaraju - politician

== Image gallery ==
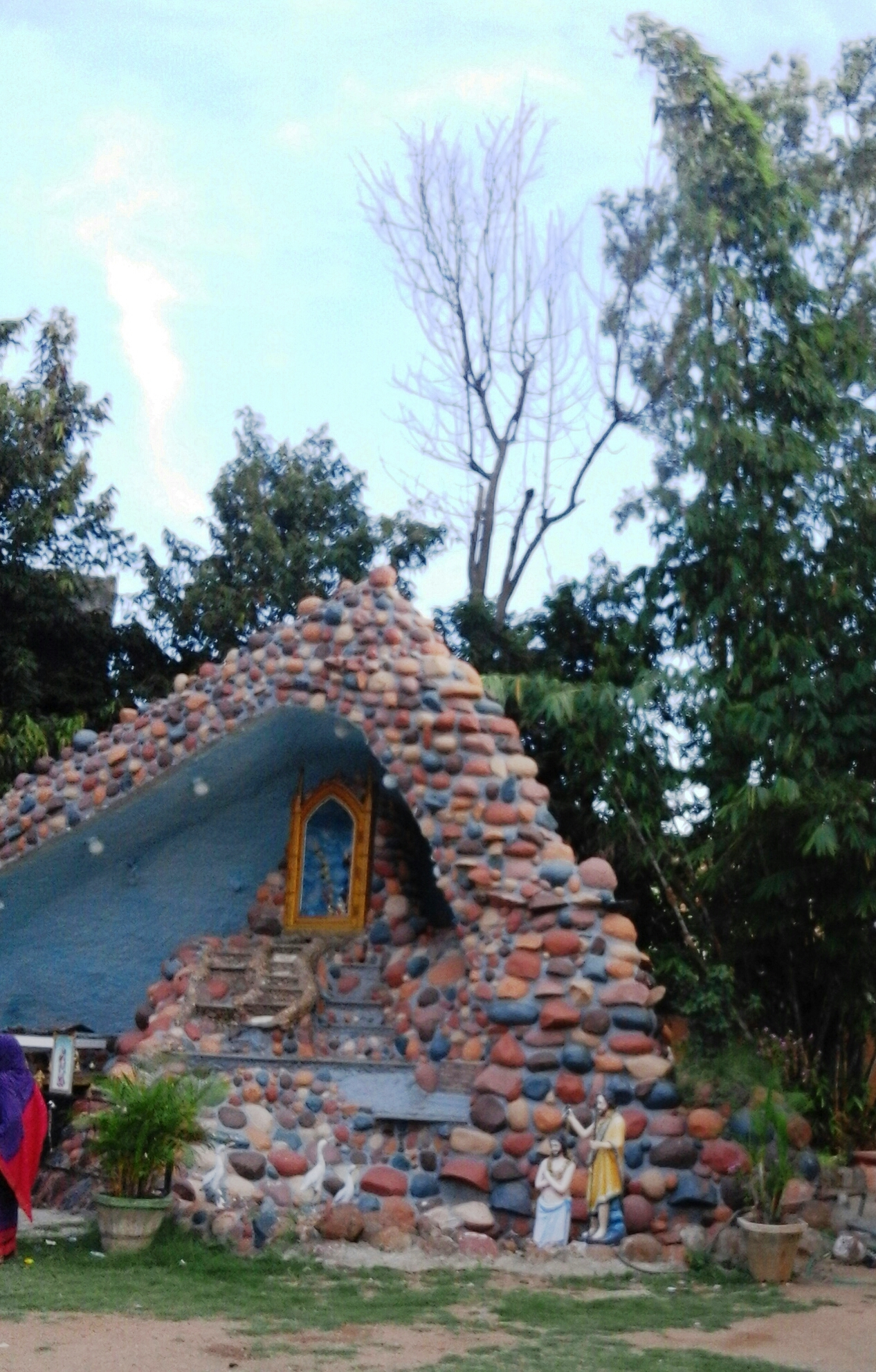
Assumption Church

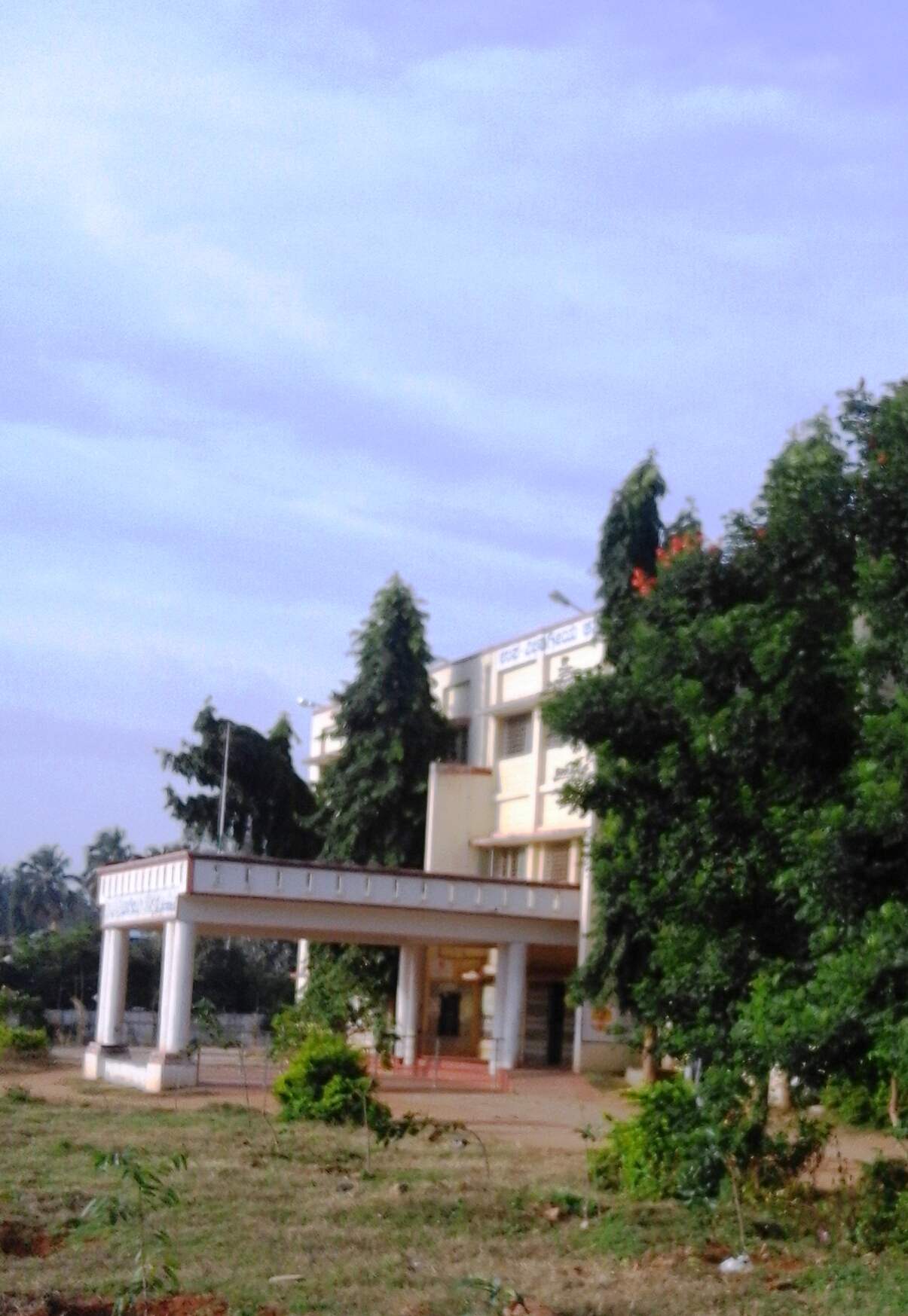
Taluk hospital

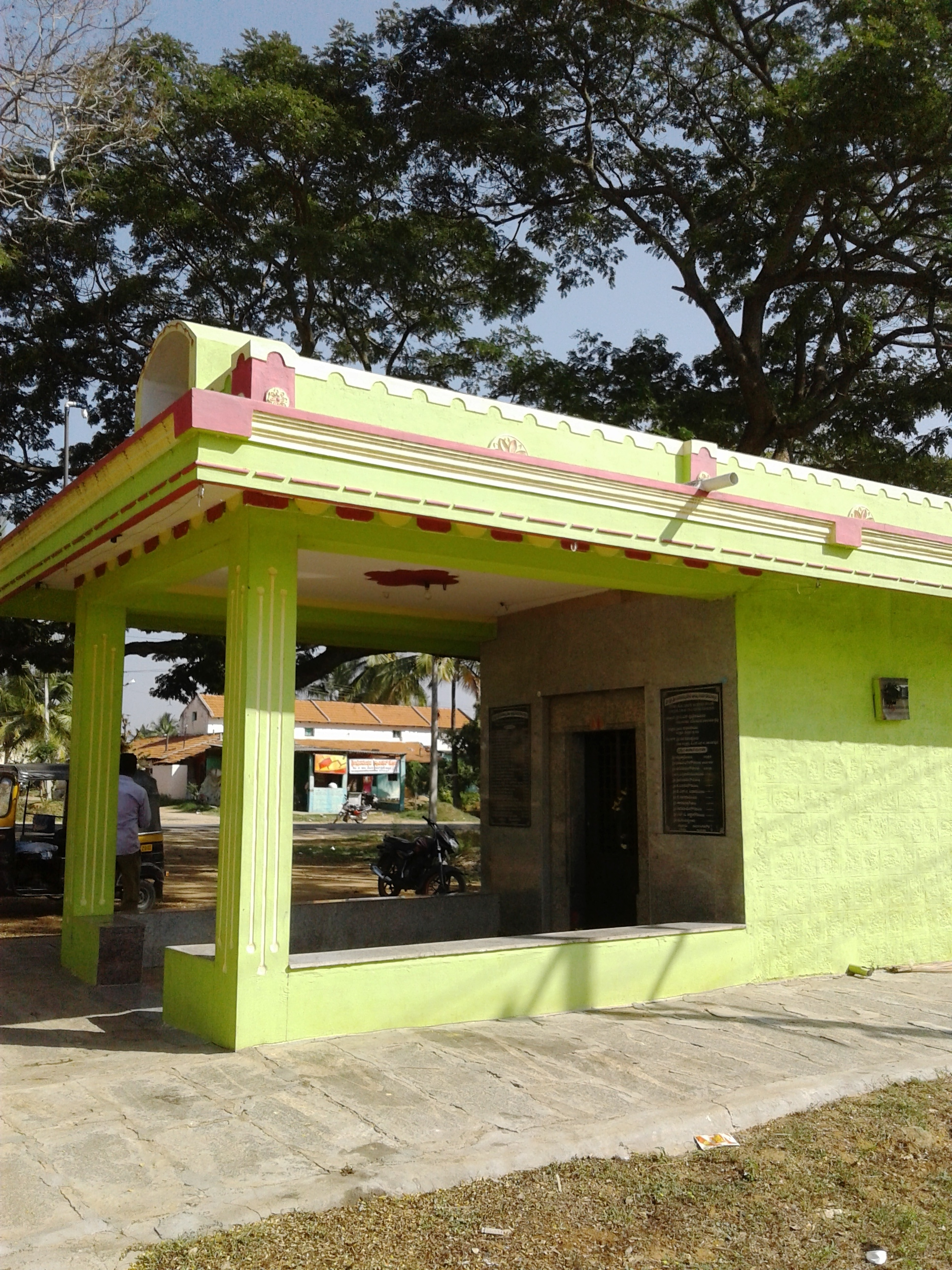
Amma Temple

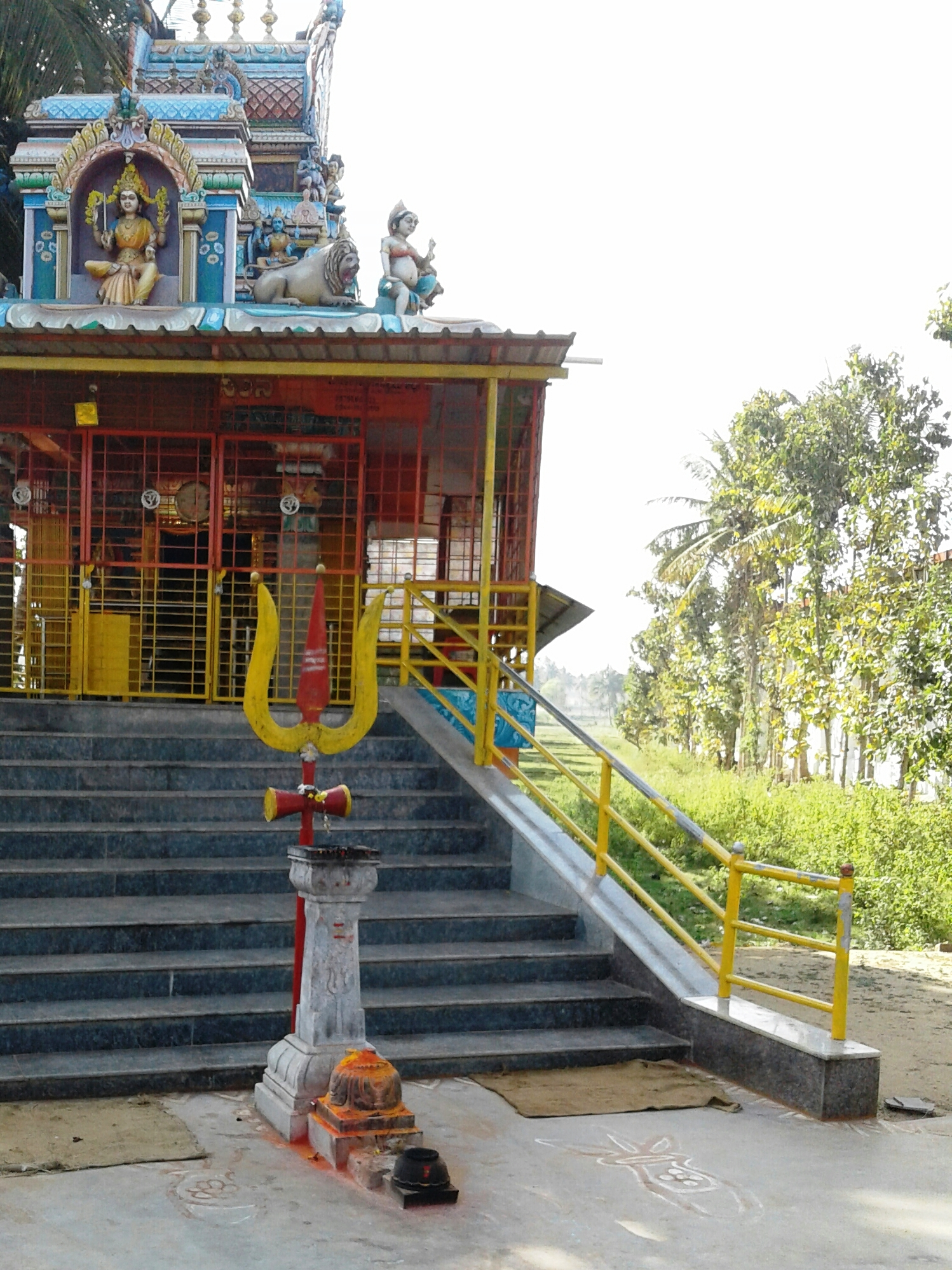
Temple on highway

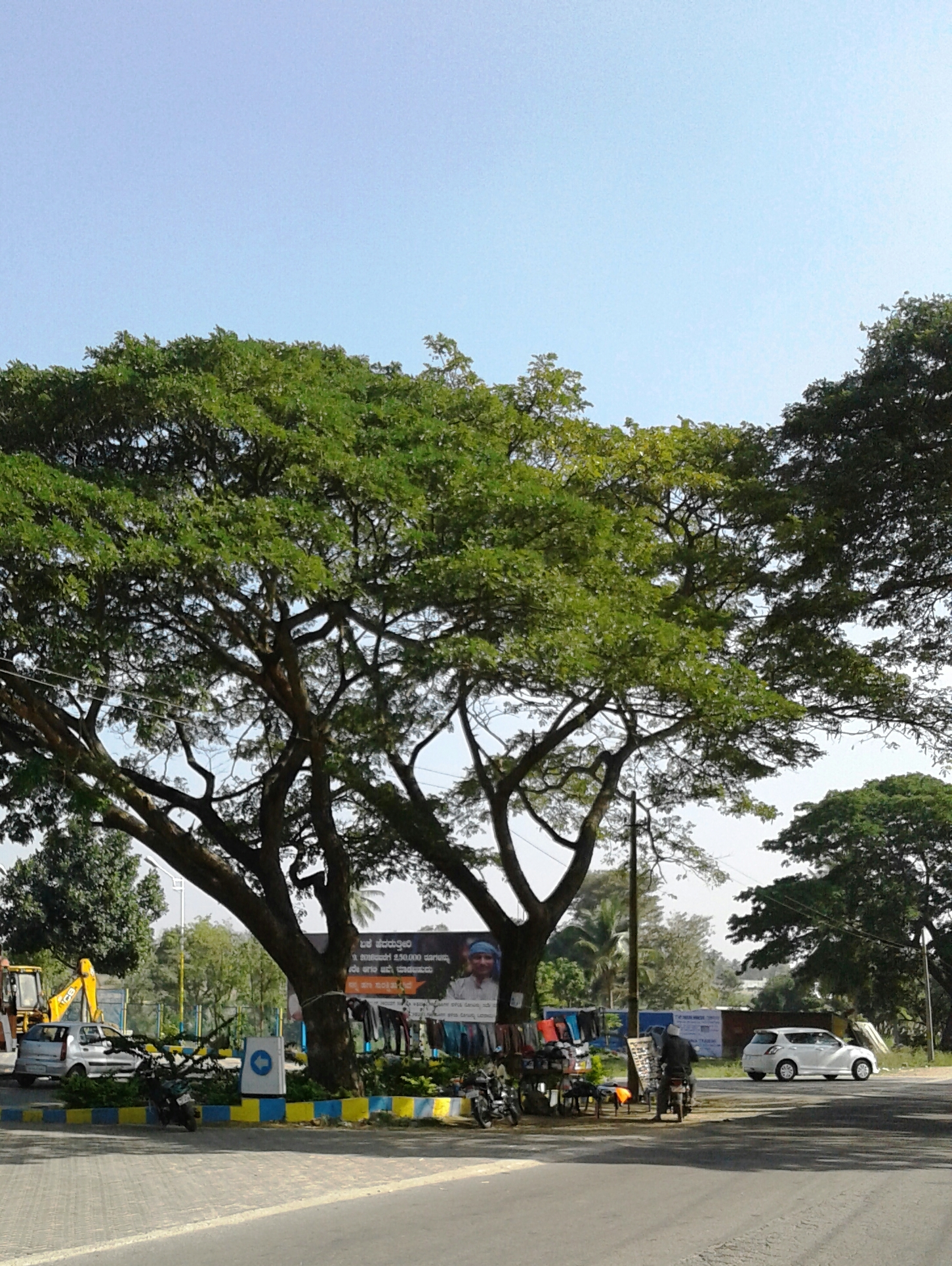
Mysore Road

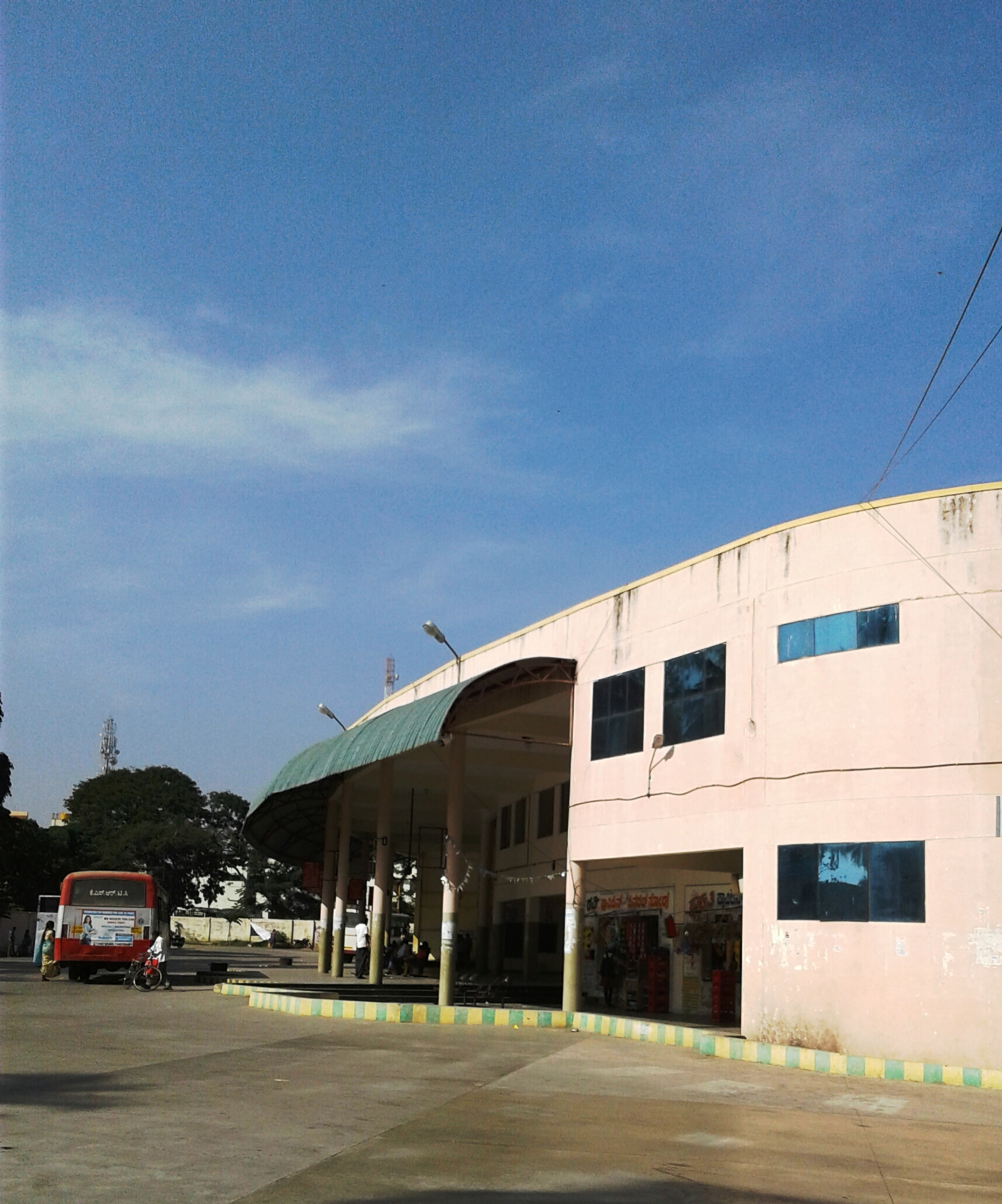
Bus Station

== See also ==
- Narayanapura
- Kere Thonnur
- Shingapoore
- Naganahalli
- Byadarahalli
- Yeliyur
- Gummanahalli
- Krishnarajpet
- Chinakurali
