= Aghalaya =

Village in India

Coordinates: 12°48′18″N 76°31′26″E

- village
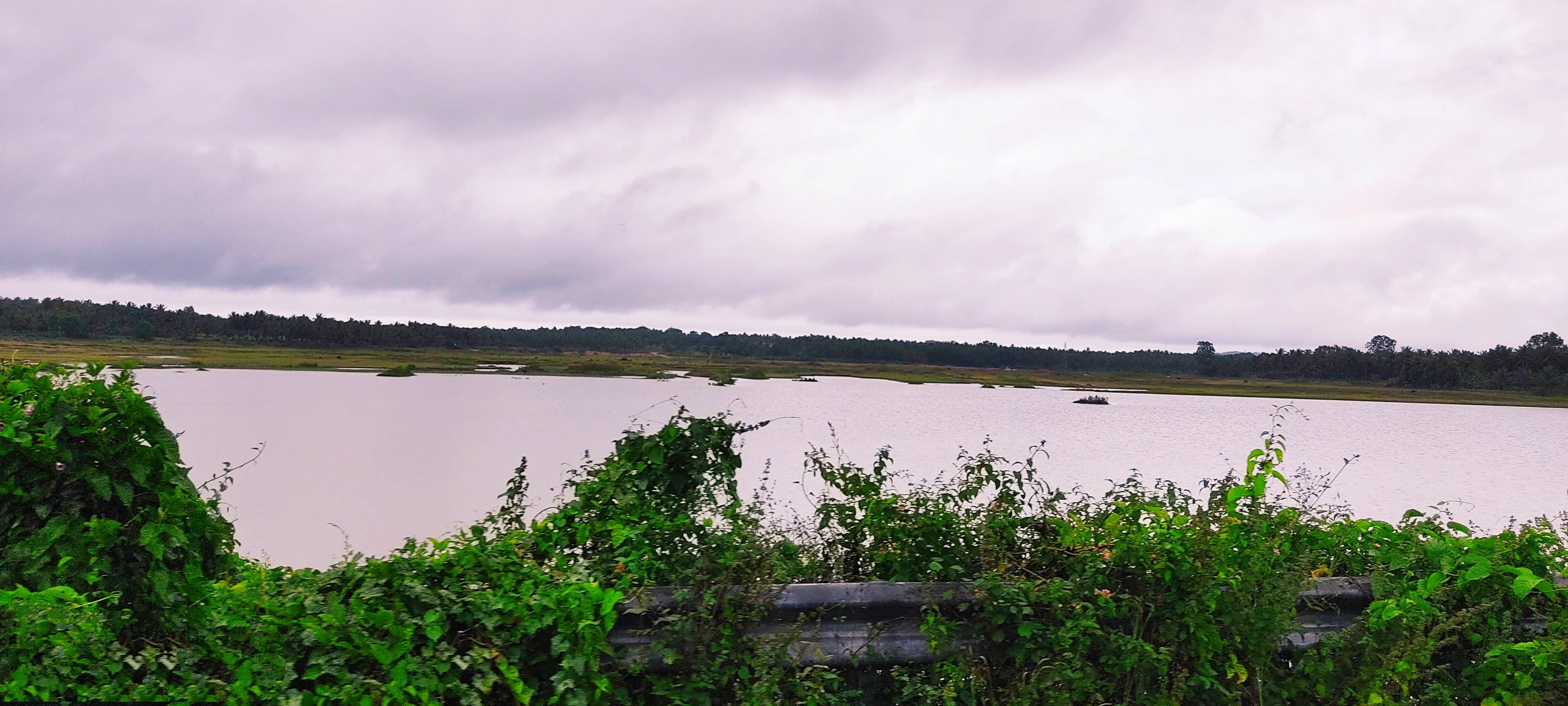
- Aghalaya lake
- Interactive map of Aghalaya
- Country: India
- State: Karnataka
- District: Mandya
- Talukas: Krishnarajpet

Government
  - Body: Village Panchayat

Languages
  - Official: Kannada
- Time zone: UTC+5:30 (IST)
- Nearest city: Mandya
- Civic agency: Village Panchayat

Kaadumallapura or Aghalaya is a village in the southern state of Karnataka, India. It is located in the Krishnarajpet taluk of Mandya district in Karnataka. Aghalaya village is famous for the ancient Malleswara temple of lord Shiva.

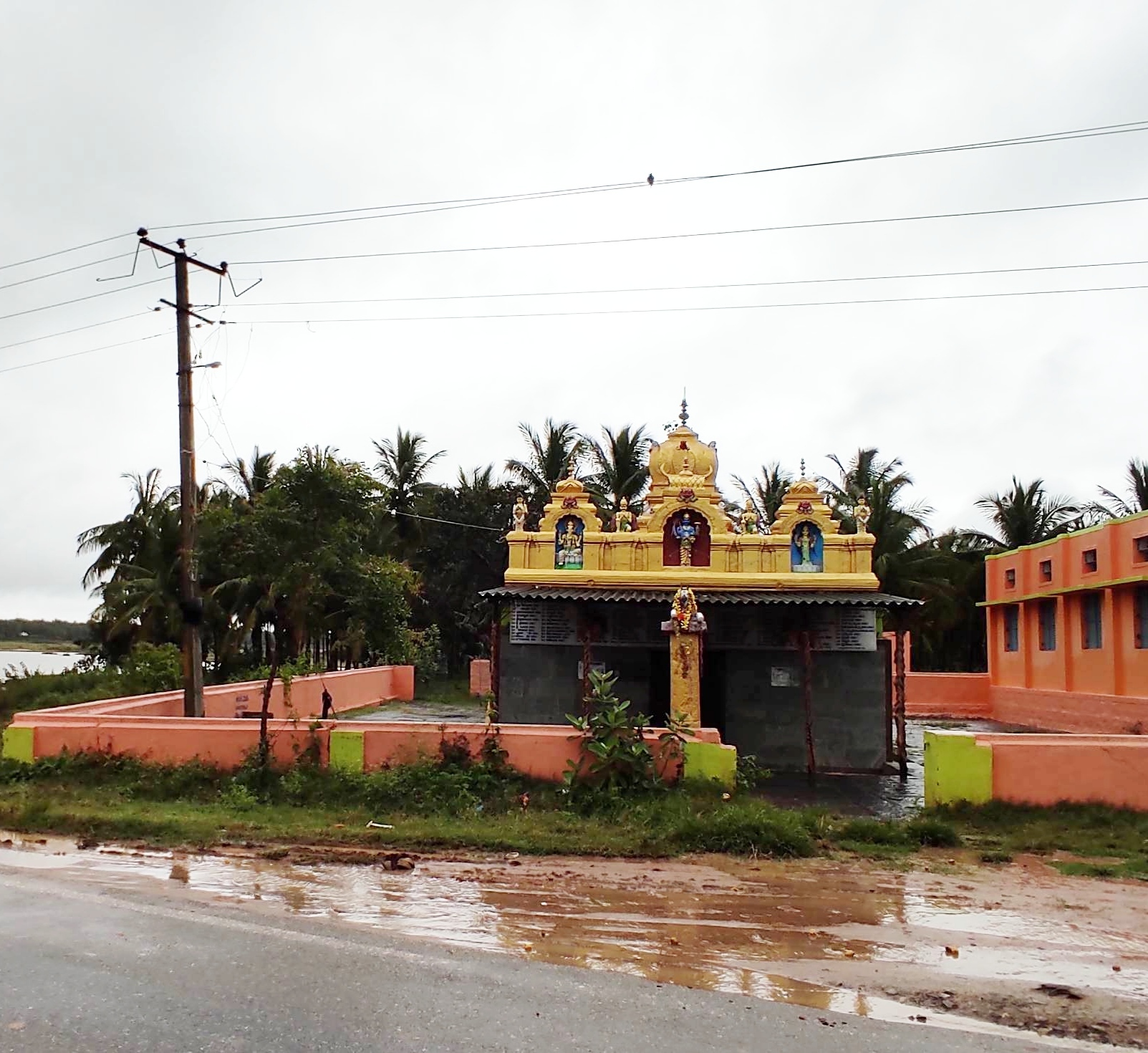
Bhairaveshwara temple in Aghalaya

== Etymology ==
Kaadumallapura was sanskritised as Aghalaya, Agha means Sin and Laya means to Annihilate in Sanskrit language. Lord Malleshwara is believed to be the annihilator of people's sins in the place, so the place is called as Aghalaya.

== See also ==
- Mandya
- Districts of Karnataka
