= Laxminarayan (disambiguation) =

Lakshmi Narayana is the name of a divine couple in Hinduism.

Lakshminarayan or Lakshmi Narayan may also refer to:

- Lakshminarayan of Bhurishrestha, last ruler of the independent Hindu kingdom of Bhurishrestha
- Laxminarayana Mudiraj, Indian politician
- Rambhatla Lakshminarayana Sastry, an eminent Indian teacher and author
- Lakshmi Narayan Sharma, Hindi guru and exponent of Bhakti yoga
- Laxmi Narayan Tripathi, Indian LGBT activist
- Appadvedula Lakshmi Narayan (1887–1973), Indian astrophysicist
- V. V. Lakshminarayana, Additional Director General of Police in Mumbai
- P. Lakshmi Narayana, Indian actor
- Sattiraju Lakshmi Narayana, Indian film director

== Other uses ==
- Laxmi Narayan (film), a 1951 Hindi film

== See also ==
- Laxmi Narayan Mandir (disambiguation)
- Lakshmi (disambiguation)
- Narayan (disambiguation)
