= Lakshminarayana Temple =

Lakshminarayana Temple may refer to several temples in Karnataka, India:

- Lakshminarayana Temple, Adagur in Hassan district
- Lakshminarayana Temple, Hosaholalu, in Mandya district

== See also ==
- Laxmi Narayan Mandir (disambiguation)
- Sri Lakshmi Narayanan Temple, Seoul, South Korea
- Sri Lakshmi Narayani Golden Temple, Vellore, India
