= Laxmi Narayan Mandir =

Laxmi Narayan Mandir or Lakshmi Narayan Temple may refer to the following Hindu temples dedicated to Lakshmi Narayan:

== Asia ==
- Lakshmi Narayan Temple, Agartala, Tripura, India
- Durgiana Temple, in Amritsar, India
- Laxminarayan Temple, in Delhi, India
- Laxmi Narayan Temple, Jaipur, Rajasthan, India
- Laxmi Narayan Temple, Odisha, India
- Laxminarayan Temple, Therubali, Odisha, India
- Lakshmi Narayan temple, Chamba, Himachal Pradesh, India
- Laxmi Narayan Mandir, Dhaka, Bangladesh
- Shri Laxmi Narayan Mandir, Karachi, Pakistan
- Shri Laxminarayan Temple, Kolkata, West Bengal, India
- Sri Lakshmi Narayanan Temple, Seoul, South Korea
- Sri Lakshmi Narayani Golden Temple, Vellore, India
- Laxmi Narain Mandir, in Mardan, Pakistan

== Europe and North America ==
- Shree Lakshmi Narayan Hindu Temple, Bradford, in West Yorkshire, England
- Laxmi-Narayan Mandir, in Belfast
- Shri Lakshmi Narayan Mandir Orlando, Florida, United States

== See also ==
- Laxminarayan (disambiguation)
- Lakshminarayana Temple (disambiguation)
