= Chinakurali =

Coordinates: 12.539373°N 76.603895°E

Chinakurali Village

Chinakurali is a village in Pandavapura, Mandya, Karnataka, India.

== Location ==
Chinakurali village is located between Pandavapura and Krishnarajpet towns in Southern Karnataka. The village is located 1`2 km away from Pandavapura town.

== Demographics ==
The village has a population of 12000 people as per the 2011 census. The area of the village is 398 hectares.

== Administration ==
Chinakurali village is part of Pandavapura Taluk in Mandya district. The village is 137 km from the state capital of Bangalore.

== Nearby places ==
- Lingapura, 1 km
- Kumbarakoppalu, 1 km
- Chikka Boganahalli, 2 km
- Kanganahalli, 2 km

== Post office ==
There is a post office in Chinakurali and the postal code is 571455. The post office comes under Mandya Head Post Office.

== Gallery ==
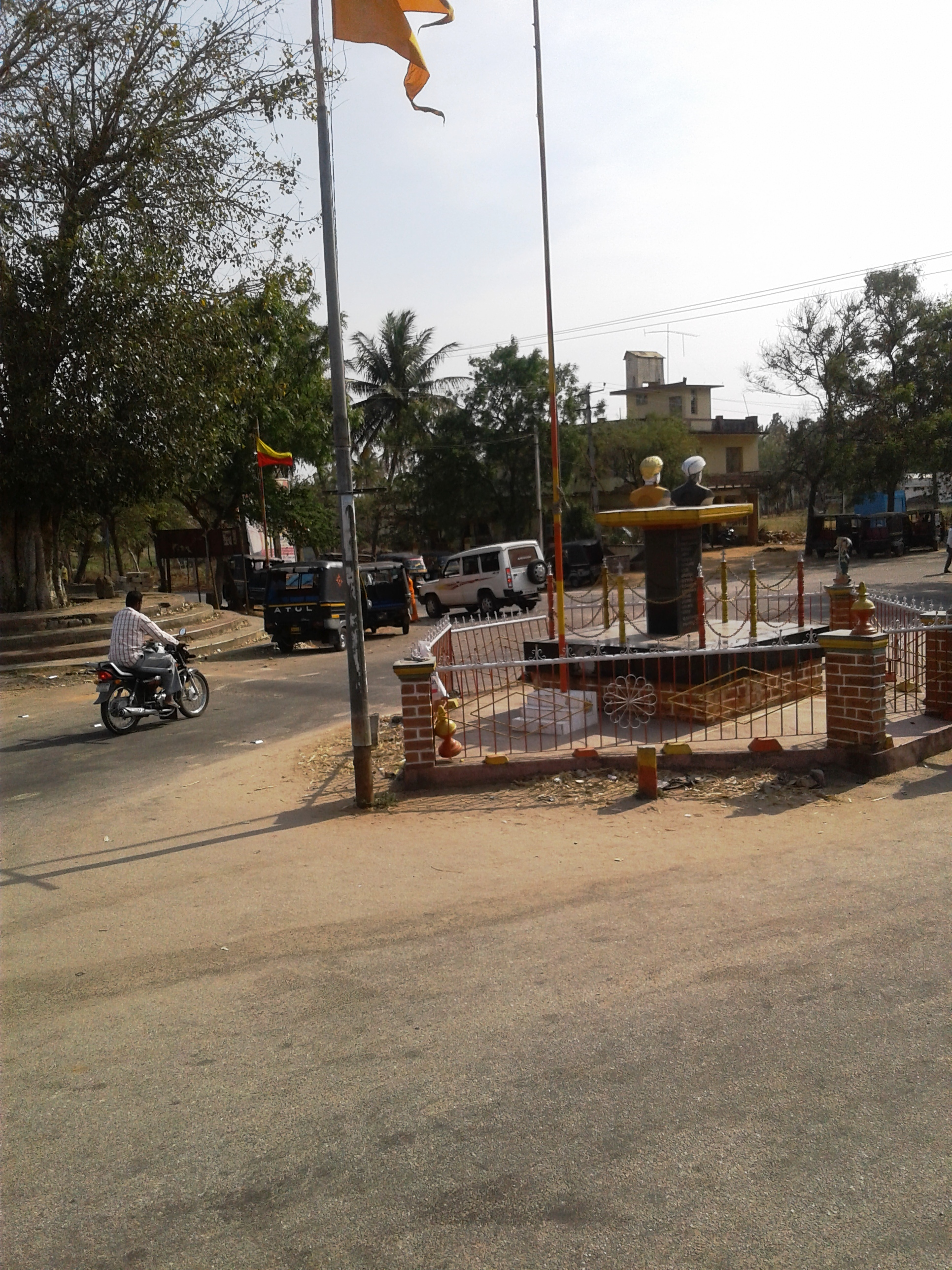
Yellerker Junction

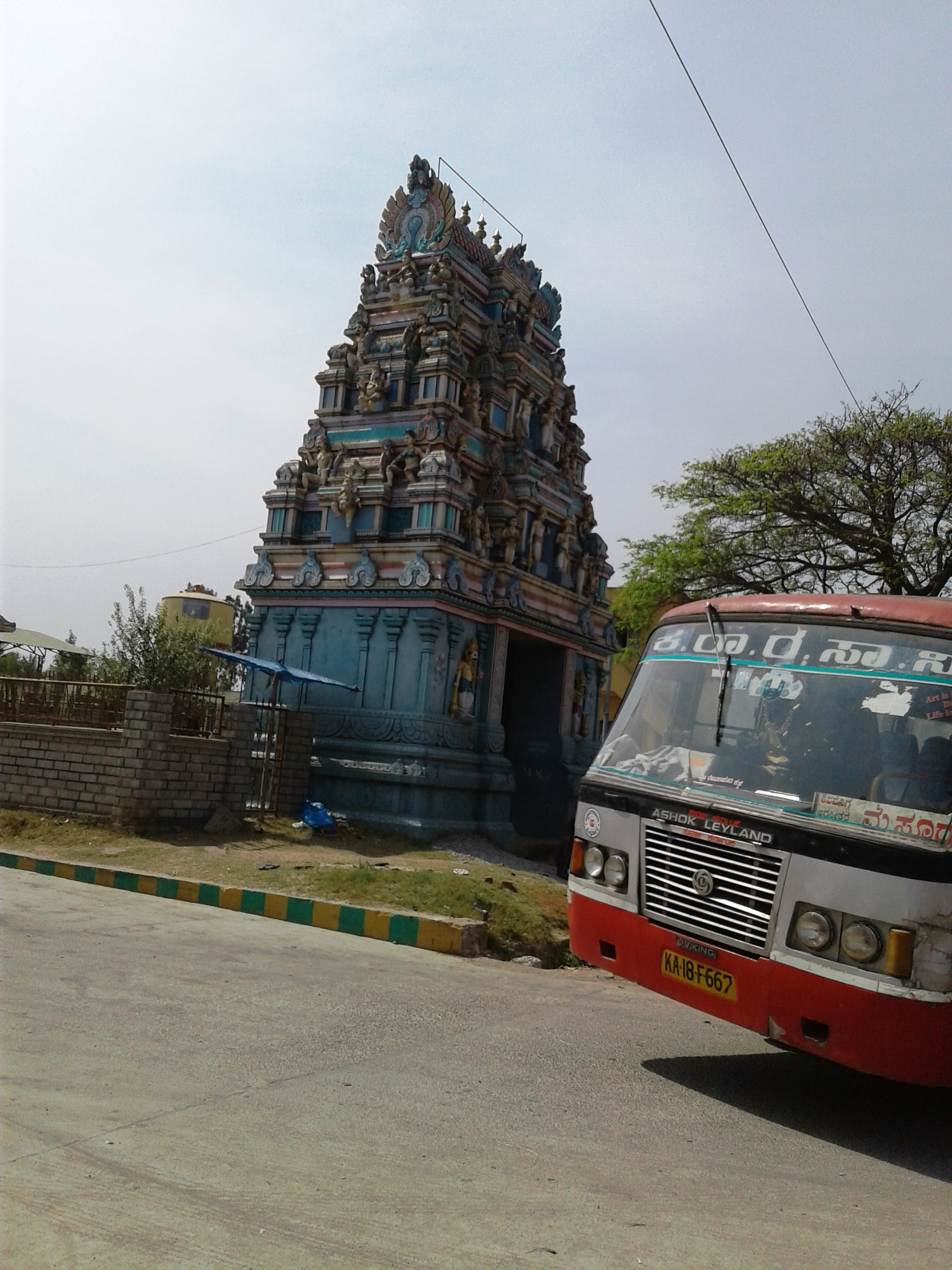
Chinakurali Bus Station

== See also ==
- Gummanahalli
- Krishnarajpet
- Pandavapura
