= Narayani =

Narayani may refer to:

- Narayani, an epithet of the goddess Lakshmi or Vishnu's divine illusionary energy, Yogamaya
- Narayani River, or Gandaki River, in Nepal
- Narayani Temple, in Narayani village, near Khalikote, Odisha, India
- Narayani Zone, a former administrative region of Nepal
- Narayani Shastri (fl. from 2000), Indian actress

== See also ==
- Narayan (disambiguation)
- Narayani Sena, army of Krishna in the Mahabharata
