= Narayan =

Narayan or Narayana may refer to:

== People ==
- Narayan (name), a common Indian name (including a list of persons with this and related names)

== Media and entertainment ==
- "Narayan", a song by The Prodigy on their album The Fat of the Land
- Narayan, age in the video game Myst III: Exile
- Narayan, lead character of the 2005 film Water

== Religion ==
- Narayana, another name of the Hindu god Vishnu
- Nara-Narayana, a duo of divine sages
- Lakshmi Narayana, the divine couple of Narayana accompanied by his consort, Lakshmi

== Mathematics ==
- Narayana number, a number from a sequence named after T. V. Narayana
- Narayana polynomials, a class of polynomials whose coefficients are the Narayana numbers

== Other uses ==
- Narayan, Nepal in the Dailekh District

== See also ==
- Narayani (disambiguation)
- Laxminarayan (disambiguation)
- Narayana sukta, a hymn of the Yajurveda
- Changu Narayan
- Narai, a king of Ayutthaya who was named after Narayana
