= Lakshminarayana Temple, Hosaholalu =

Vishnu temple in Karnataka

Lakshminarayana Temple
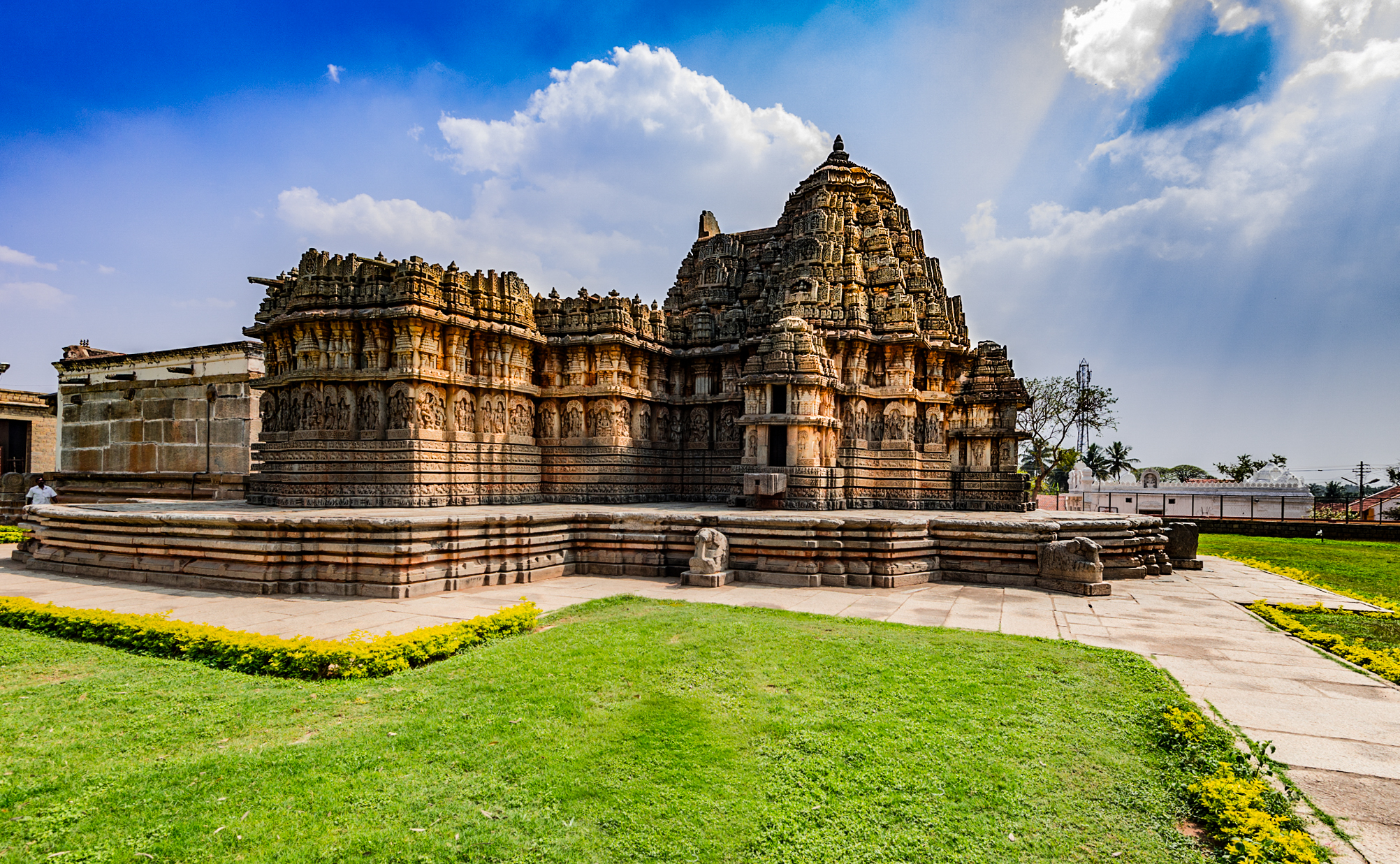
- Lakshminarayana Temple at Hosaholalu

- Location within India

Religion
- Affiliation: Hinduism
- District: Mandya
- Deity: Lakshmi Narayana (Vishnu)

Location
- Location: Hosaholalu
- State: Karnataka
- Country: India
- Coordinates: 12°38′32.9″N 76°28′43.1″E

Architecture
- Type: Hoysala
- Creator: Vira Someshwara
- Completed: 13th Century
- Temple: 1

The Lakshminarayana Temple is a 13th-century Hindu temple with Hoysala architecture in Hosaholalu, Mandya district of Karnataka, India. Dedicated to Vishnu, this three-shrine monument is notable for its finely carved plinth (adhisthana) with panels of the Ramayana, the Mahabharata and the Bhagavata Purana. It has one of the most beautifully embellished Hoysala tower projection (sukanasa) that integrates the Dravida motifs with asta-bhadra Bhumija motifs from central India. Also notable are polish and jewelry-like carvings inside the temple's mandapa.

== Location and date ==
The town of Hosaholalu is about 60 kilometres (37 mi) southeast of Hassan and 45 kilometres (28 mi) northwest of the heritage city of Mysore, the cultural capital of Karnataka state.

The temple was built by King Vira Someshwara of the Hoysala Empire in 1250 C.E. It lacks a foundation inscription. The dating of the temple is based on the style of the sculptures and architecture that compares closely with the contemporary Hoysala monuments at Javagal, Nuggehalli and Somanathapura.

== Architecture ==
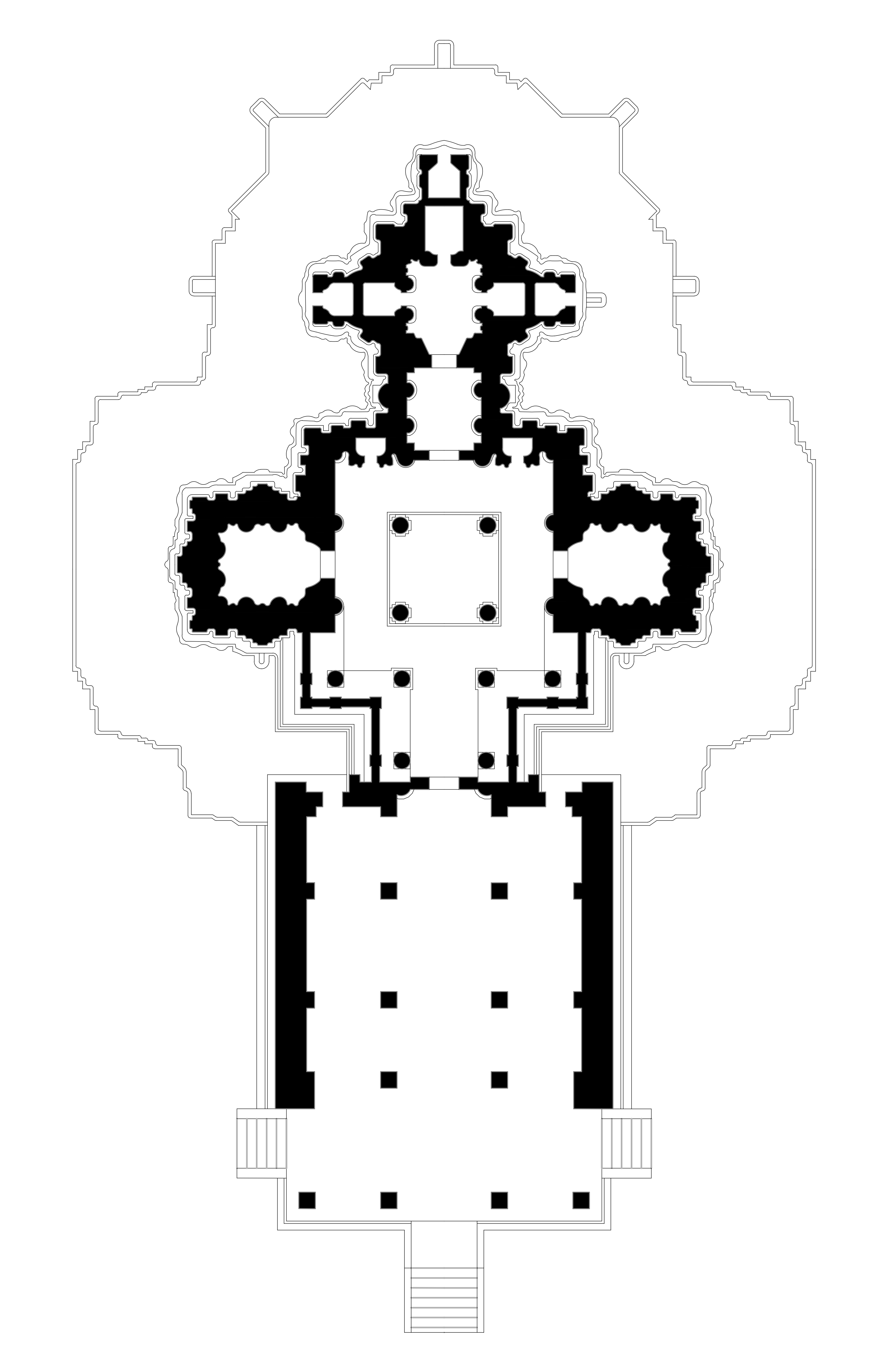
Floor plan of Lakshminarayana temple at Hosaholalu

The Vishnu temple illustrates a later stage Hoysala architecture with a square plan and four-storey Vesara vimana, one that strongly resembles the Harnahalli temples. It was built using soapstone (chloritic schist).

The temple is a trikuta vimana (three shrined) temple where only the central shrine has a tower (superstructure or shikhara) on top. The two lateral shrines merge into the ranga-mandapa towards the east. The main shrine is for Narayana, the southern shrine is dedicated to Venugopala, and the northern one to Lakshmi Narasimha.

The temple is built on a jagati (platform) with decorative elephants at corners. This elevates the temple by 4.5 feet (1.4 m). It extends well beyond the temple on all sides, thus providing an integrated pradakshinapatha (circumambulation passage).

The lateral shrines are square in construction with five projections and no special features. The central shrine is well decorated and its tower has a sukanasi (called "nose") which is actually a lower tower over the vestibule that connects the shrine (cella containing the image of the deity) to the hall (mantapa). The sukanasi looks like an extension of the main tower over the central shrine.

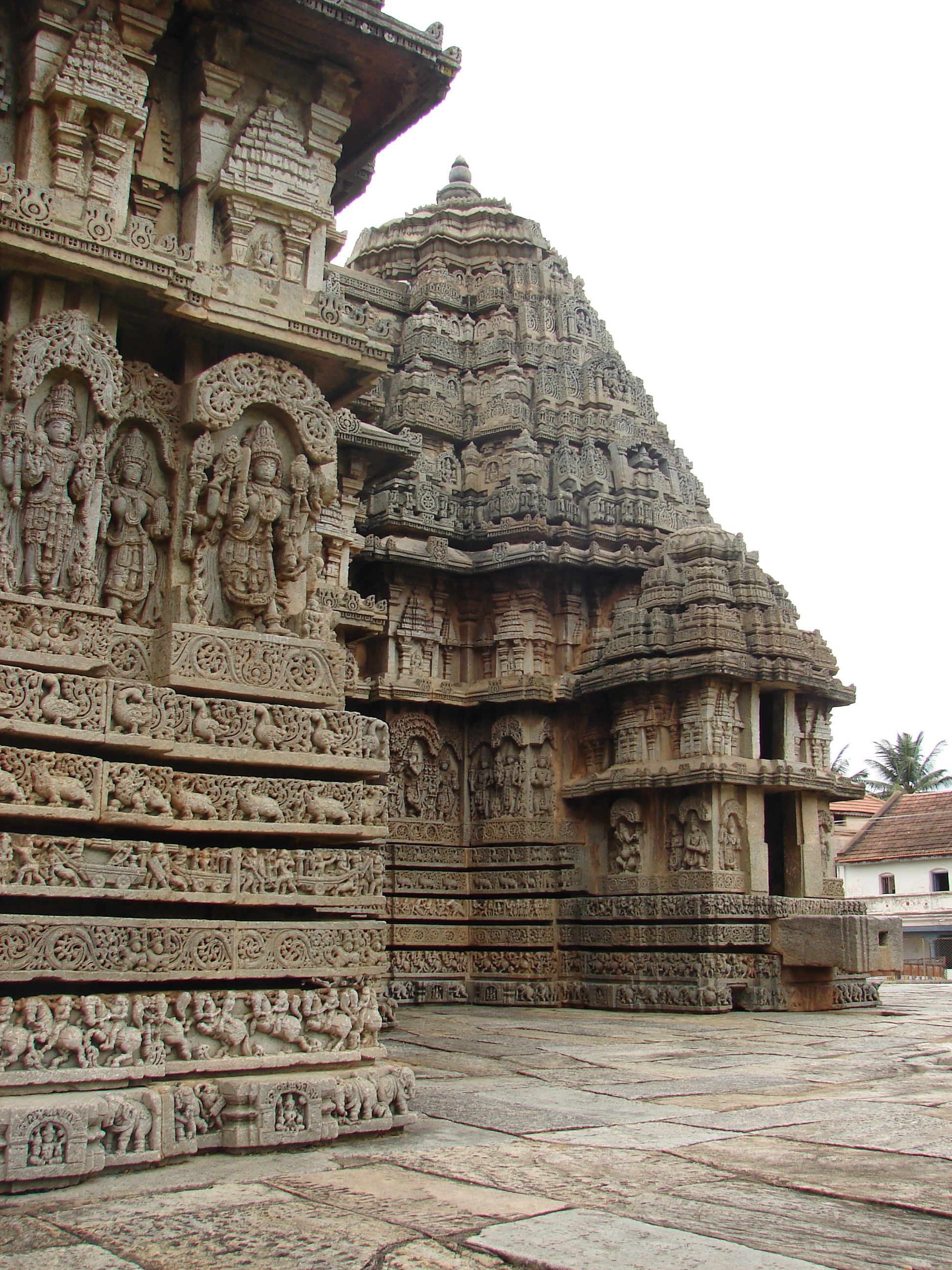
Vimana (cella) with tower and exquisite relief at Lakshminarayana temple in Hosaholalu

According to art critic Gerard Foekema, the temple as a whole exhibits the "new style" and belongs to the 2nd phase of Hoysala building activity (13th century), with two sets of eaves, and six moldings at the base of the outer wall. The first eave is located where the superstructure meets the temple outer wall and the second eave runs around the temple and about a metre below the first eave. In between the two eaves are decorative miniature towers on pilasters (called aedicule), with sculptured wall images of Hindu deities and their attendants below the second eave.

This temple depicts a hundred and twenty panels of artwork, which are largely related to the Vaishnavism tradition of Hinduism. Twenty four sculptures of Vishnu show his four arms holding his four icons – a conch, a discus, a lotus and a mace – in all possible permutations. The temple also includes panels from Shaivism and Shaktism, such as one of Mahisasuramardini stamping on the buffalo-demon. Below the panel of deities is the base of the wall consisting of six decorative rectangular moldings of equal width which run all around the temple.

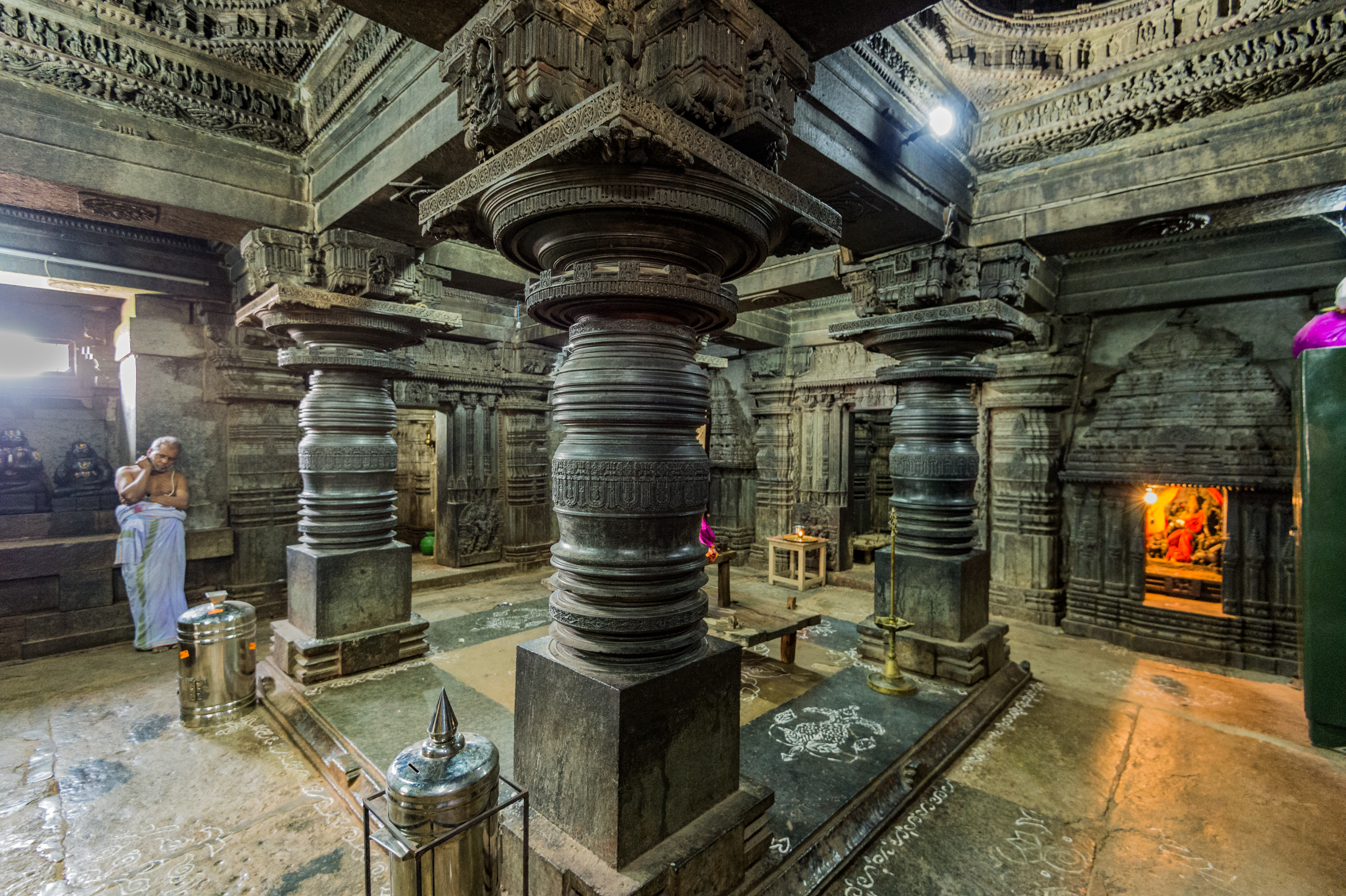
The polished pillars and jewelry-like decoration on the internal walls of the mandapa.

The six horizontal mouldings of the adhistana include intricately sculptured friezes. Seen from top to bottom; the first frieze depicts birds (hamsa), the second depicts the mythical makara, the third frieze has depictions of Ramayana, Mahabharata and Bhagavata Purana legends narrated in the clockwise direction (direction of devotee circumambulation). The fourth frieze has leafy scrolls, the fifth and sixth friezes have a procession of horses and elephants respectively. In the frieze that depicts the epics, the Ramayana starts from the western corner of the southern shrine, while the Mahabharata starts from the northern side of the central shrine vividly illustrating the demise of many heroes of the famous war between Pandavas and Kauravas.

The interior of the temple consists of a closed hall (mantapa) of modest size with four polished lathe turned pillars supporting the roof. The four central pillars divide the hall into nine equal "bays" (compartments) and nine decorated ceilings. The sanctum of the three shrines contain the images of Venugopala, Narayana in the middle and Lakshminarasimha; all forms of Vishnu.

== Gallery ==
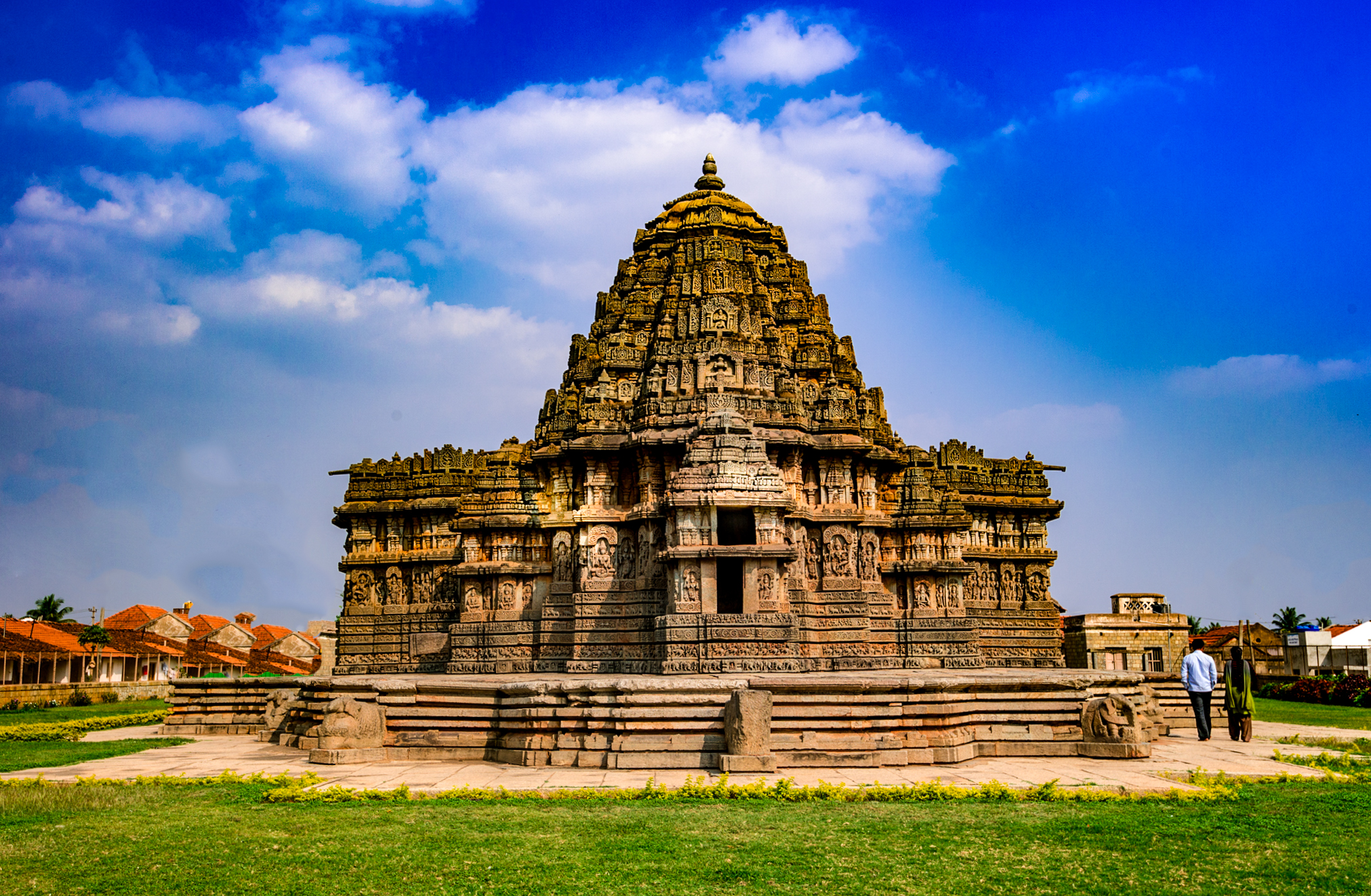
Lakshminarayana temple at Hosaholalu

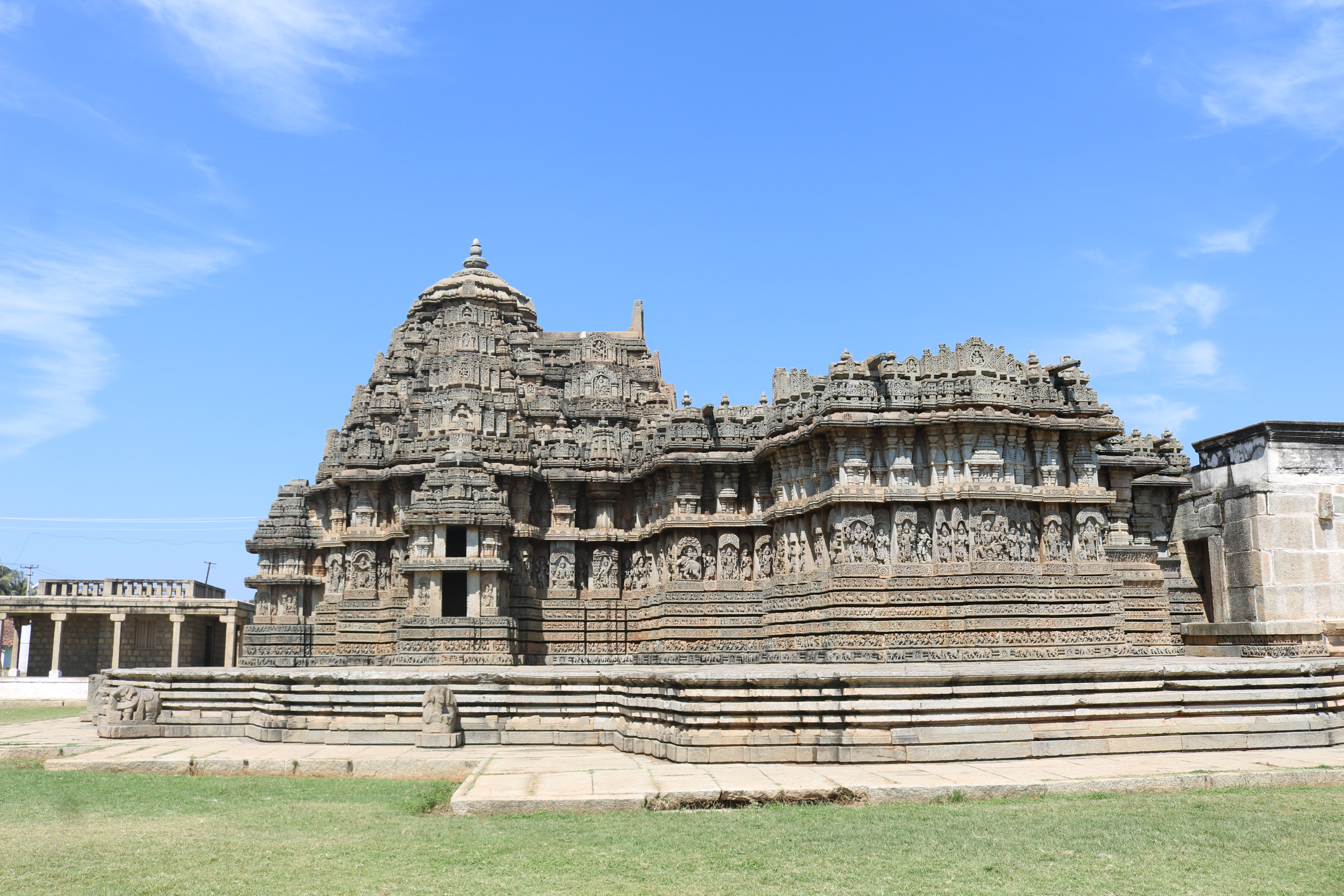
The jagati ("platform")

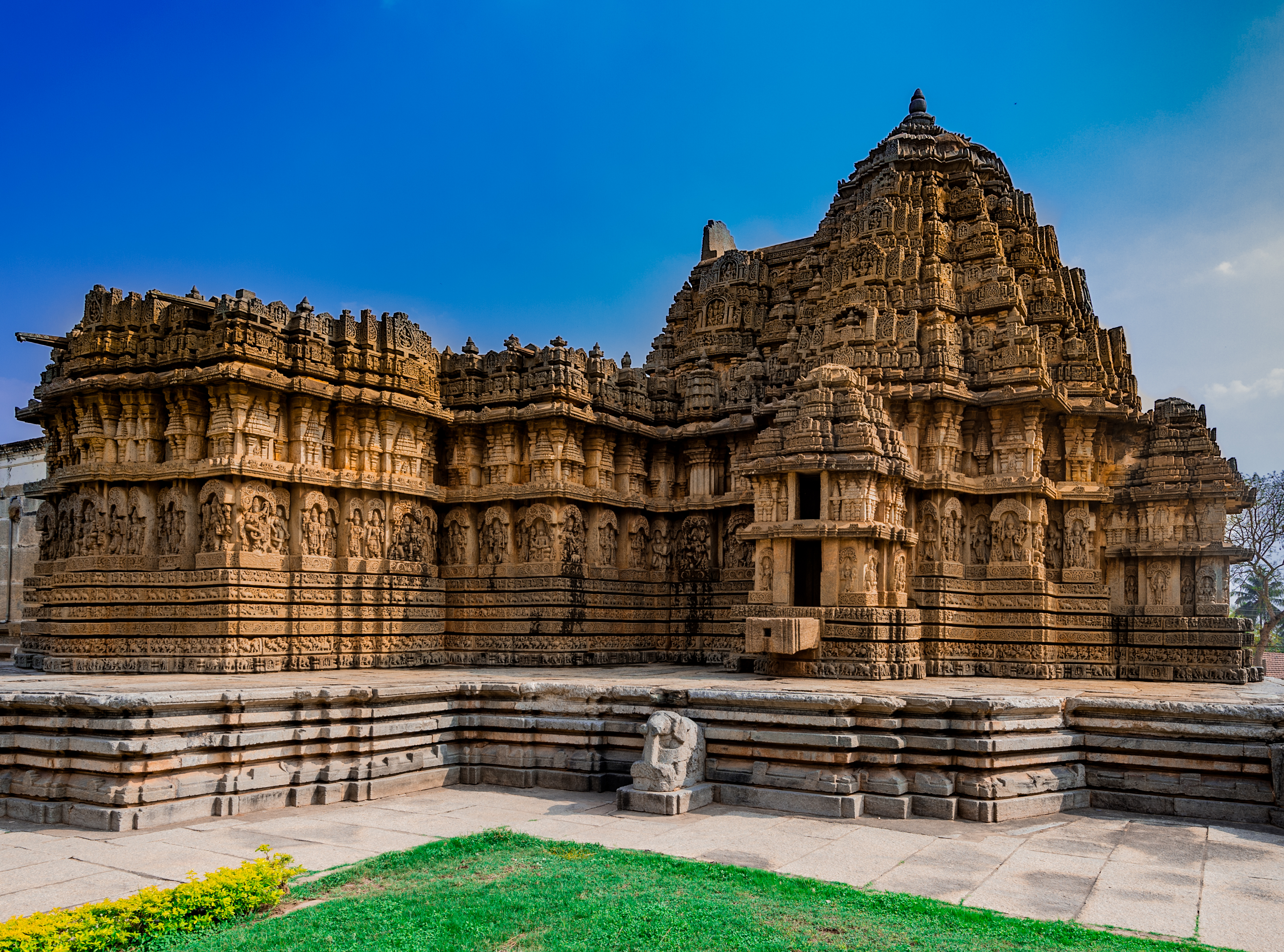
North Side View - ornate relief work on vimana exterior

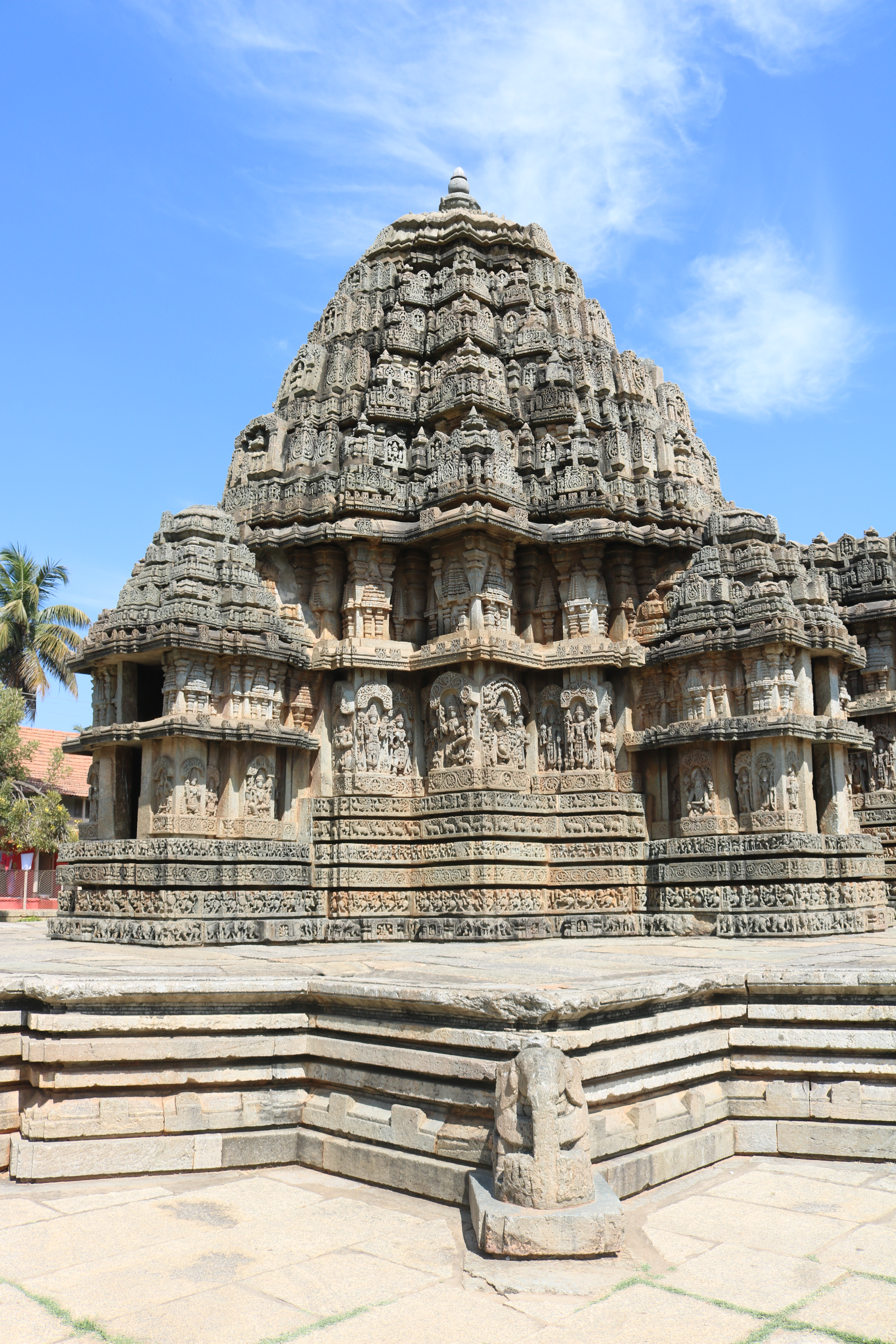
The Shrine and superstructure over it

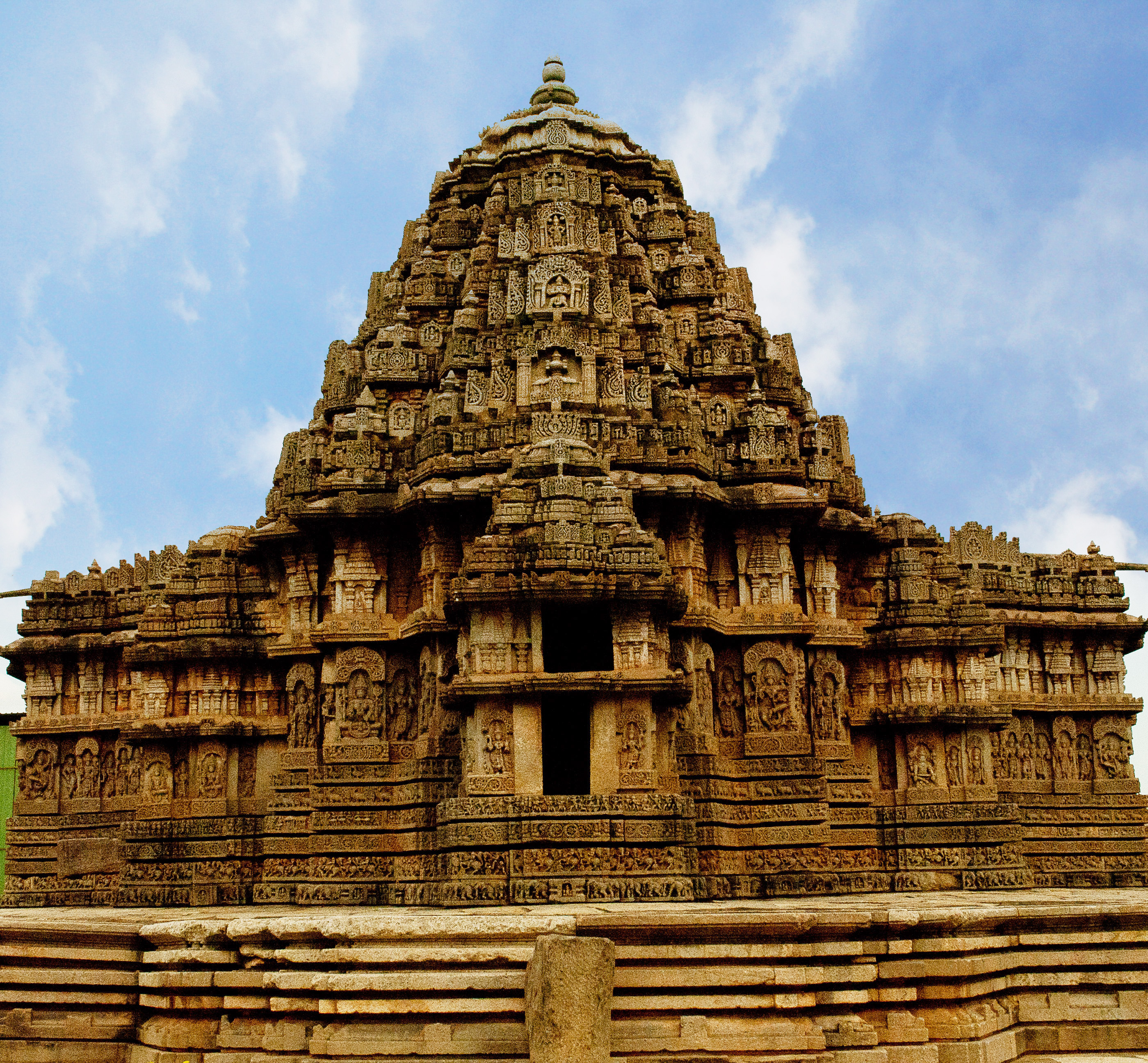
Rear view

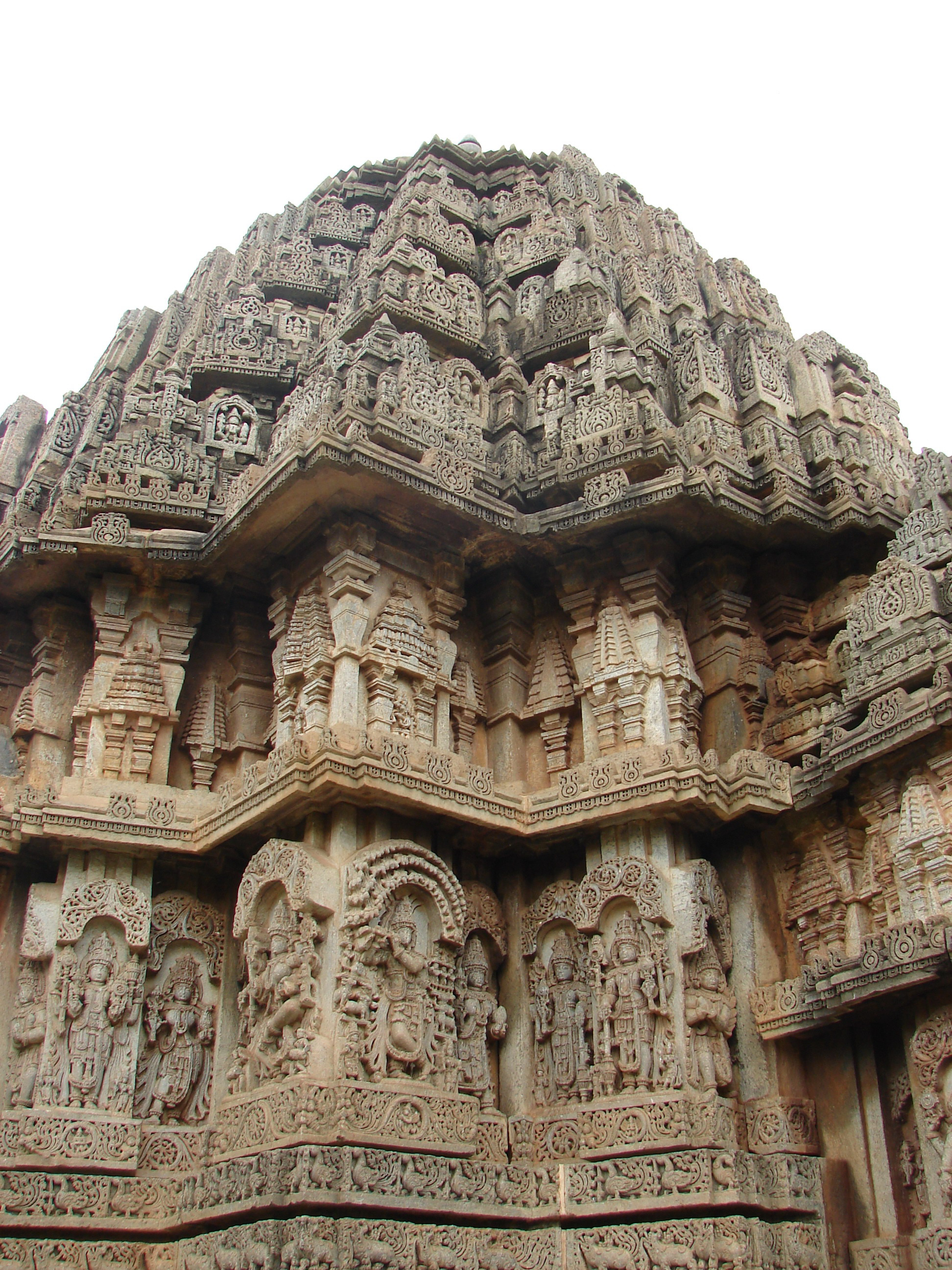
Star pointed vimana

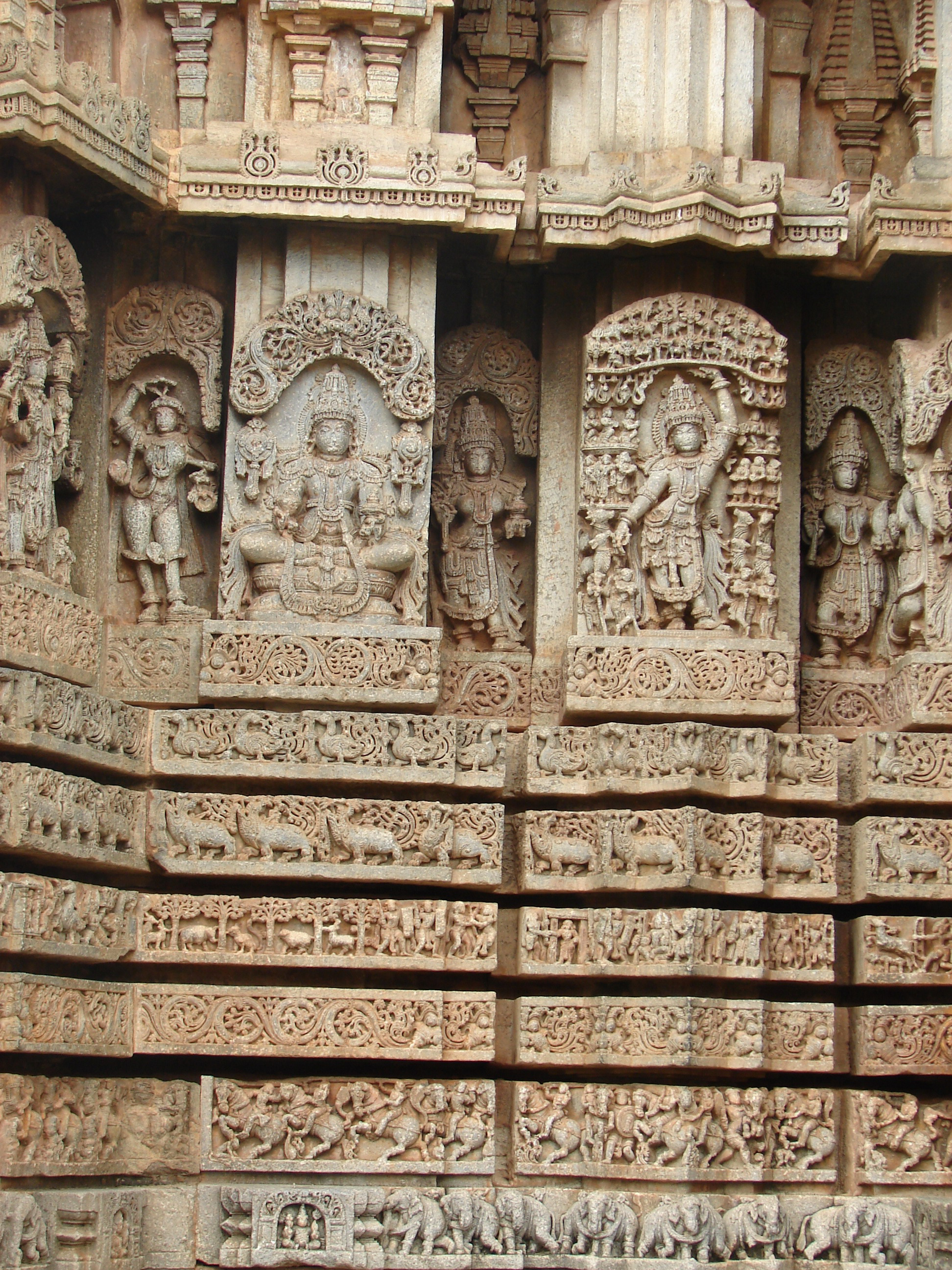
Close up of bas-relief

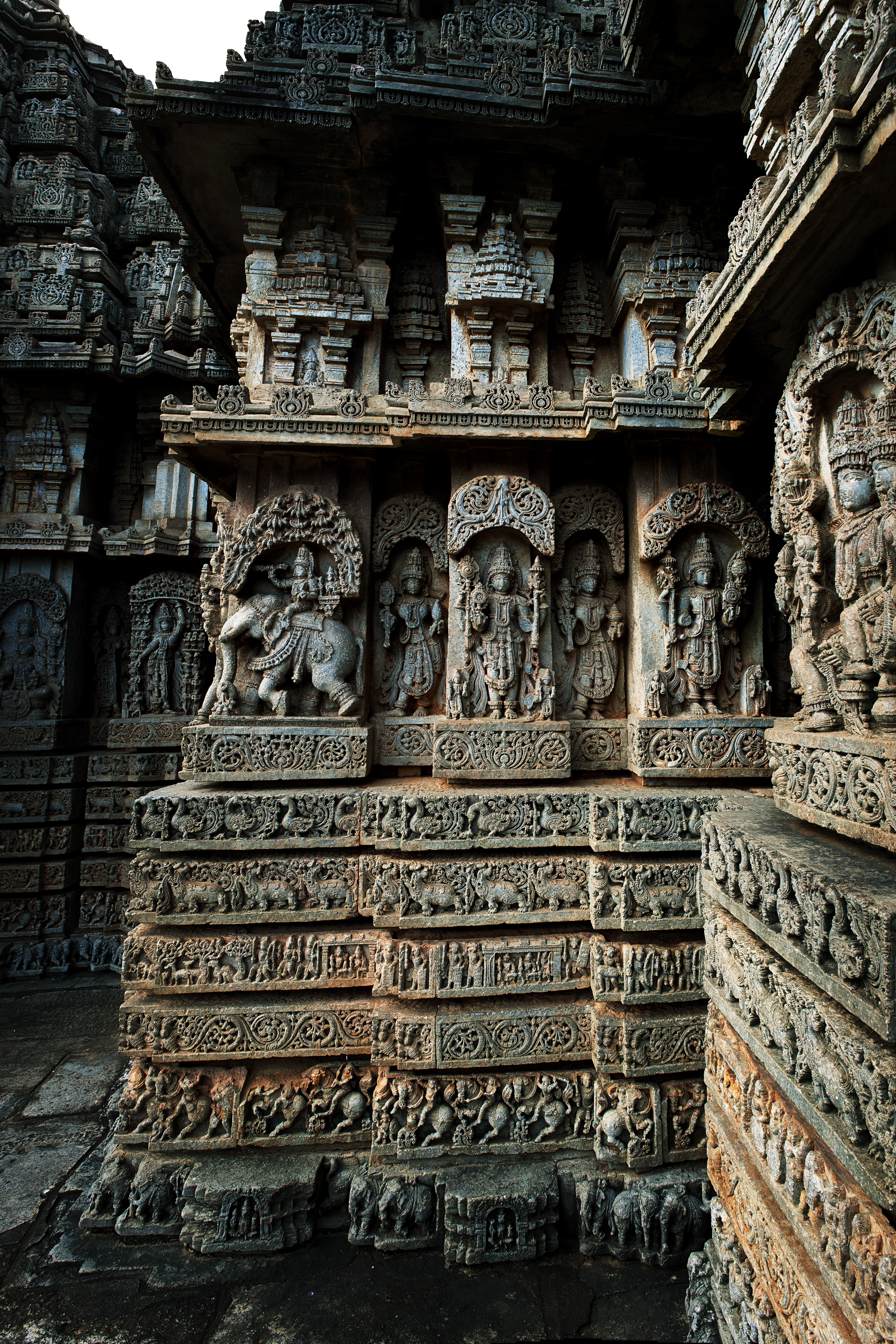
Wall relief

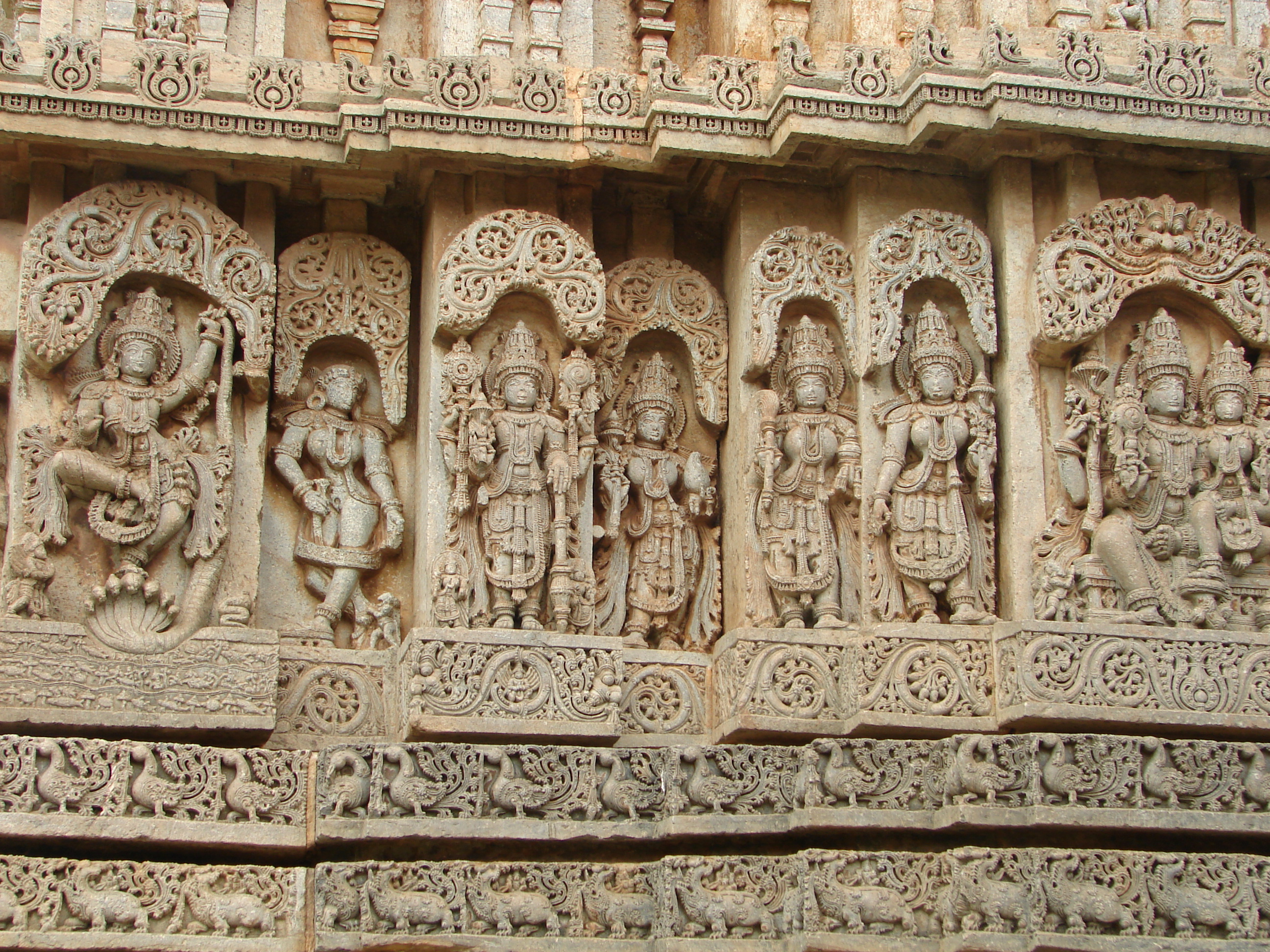
Wall panel relief

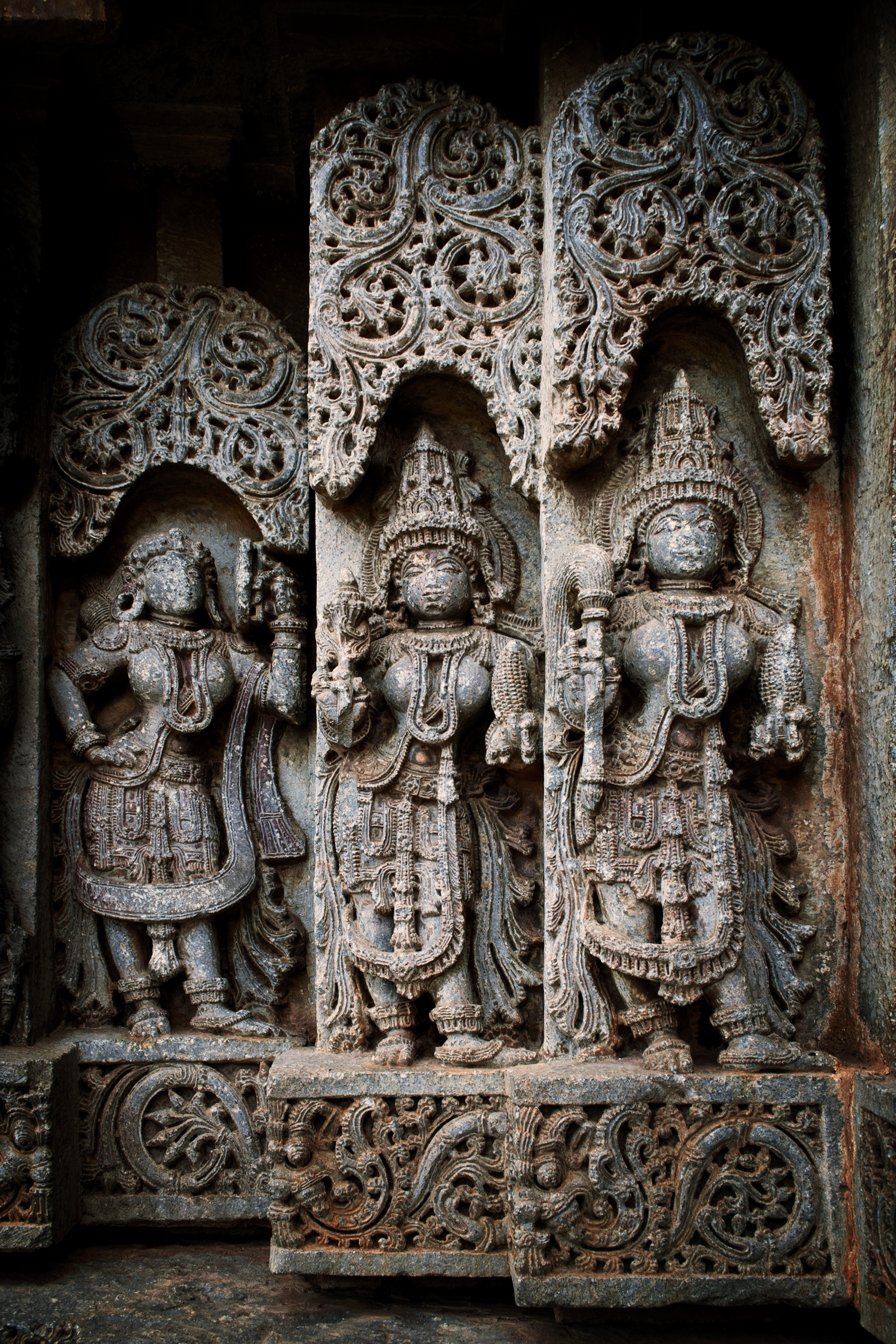
Wall relief

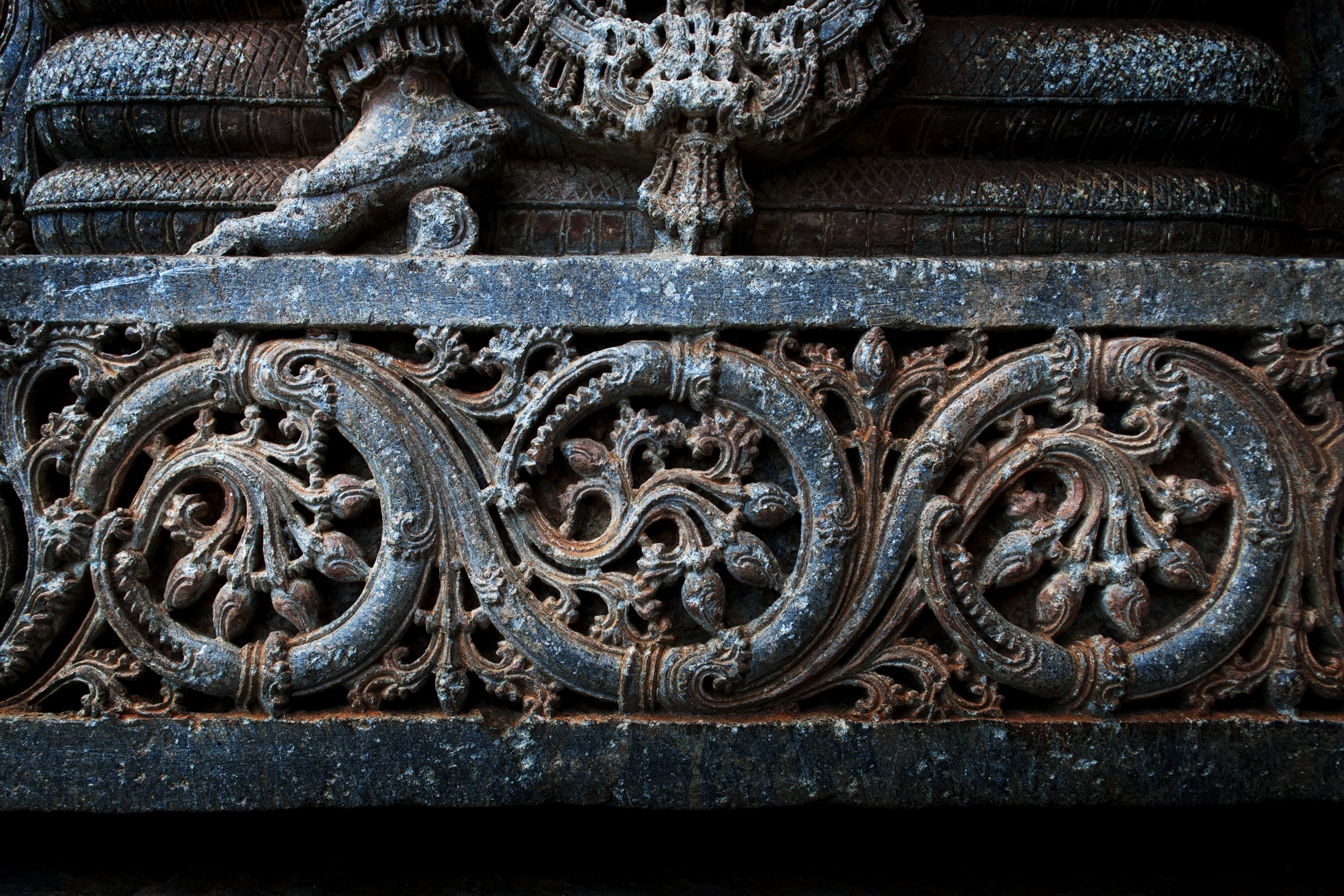
Swirls and flourishes on molding frieze

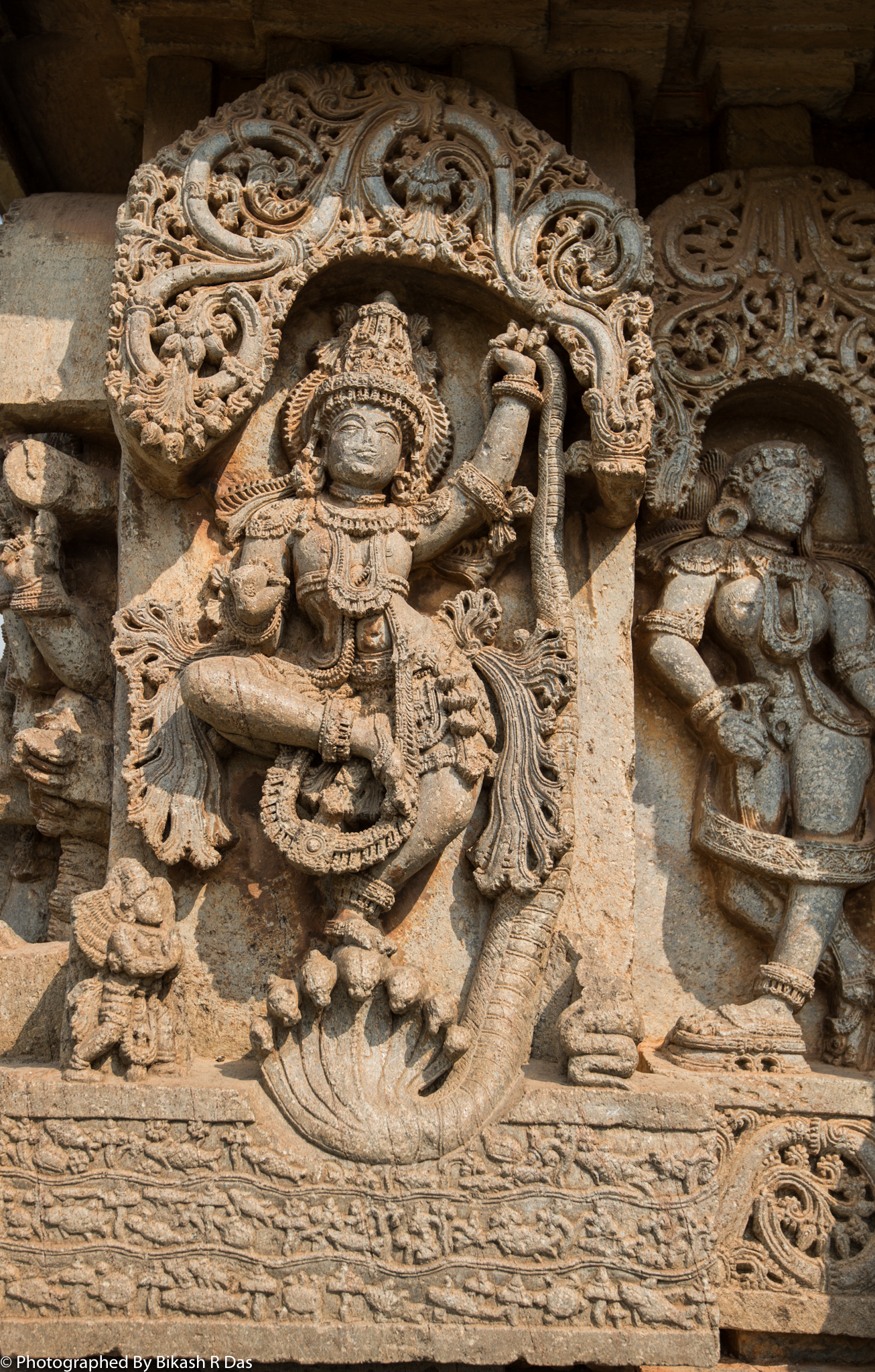
Krishna dancing on Naga

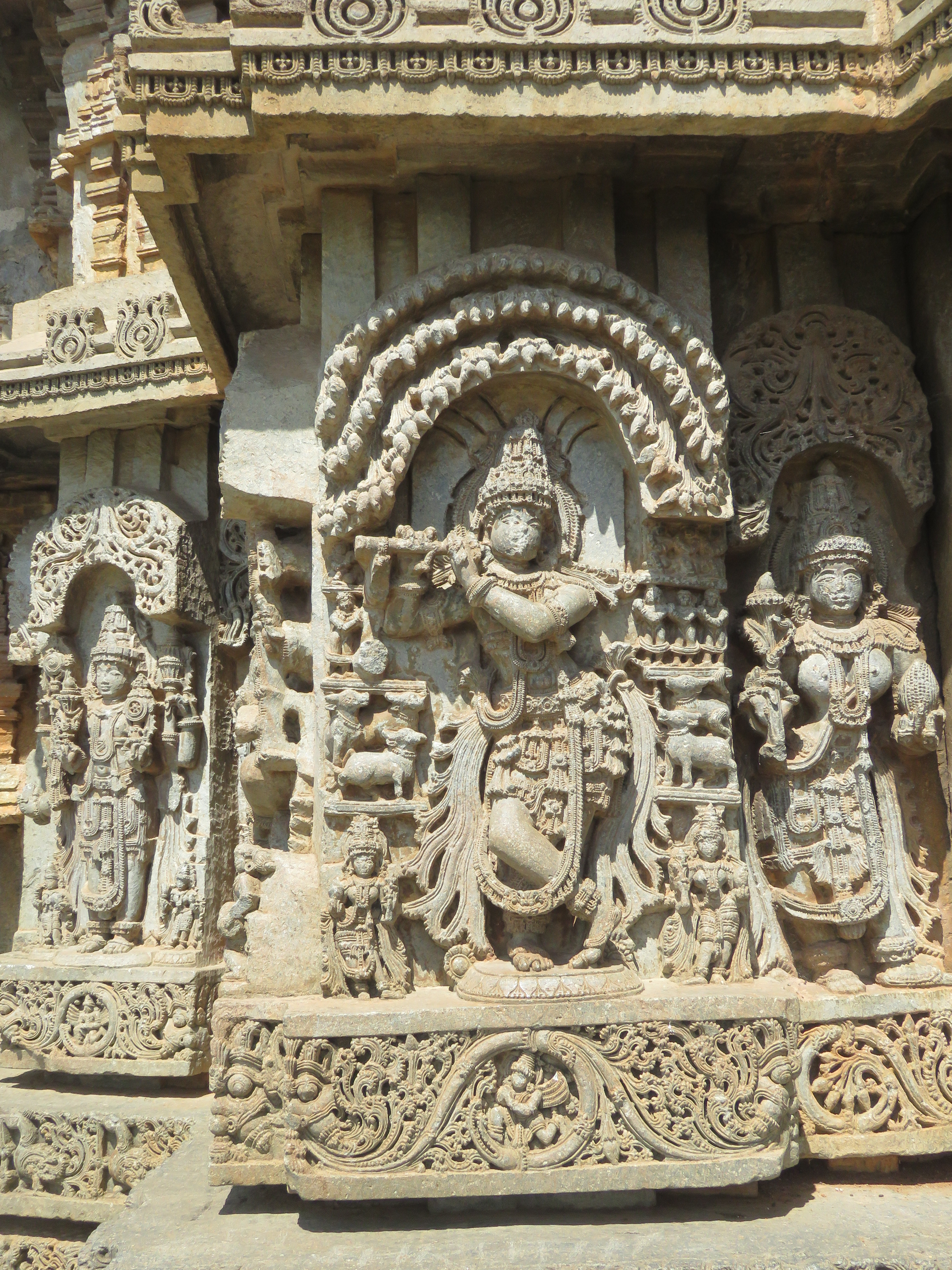
Krishna with flute

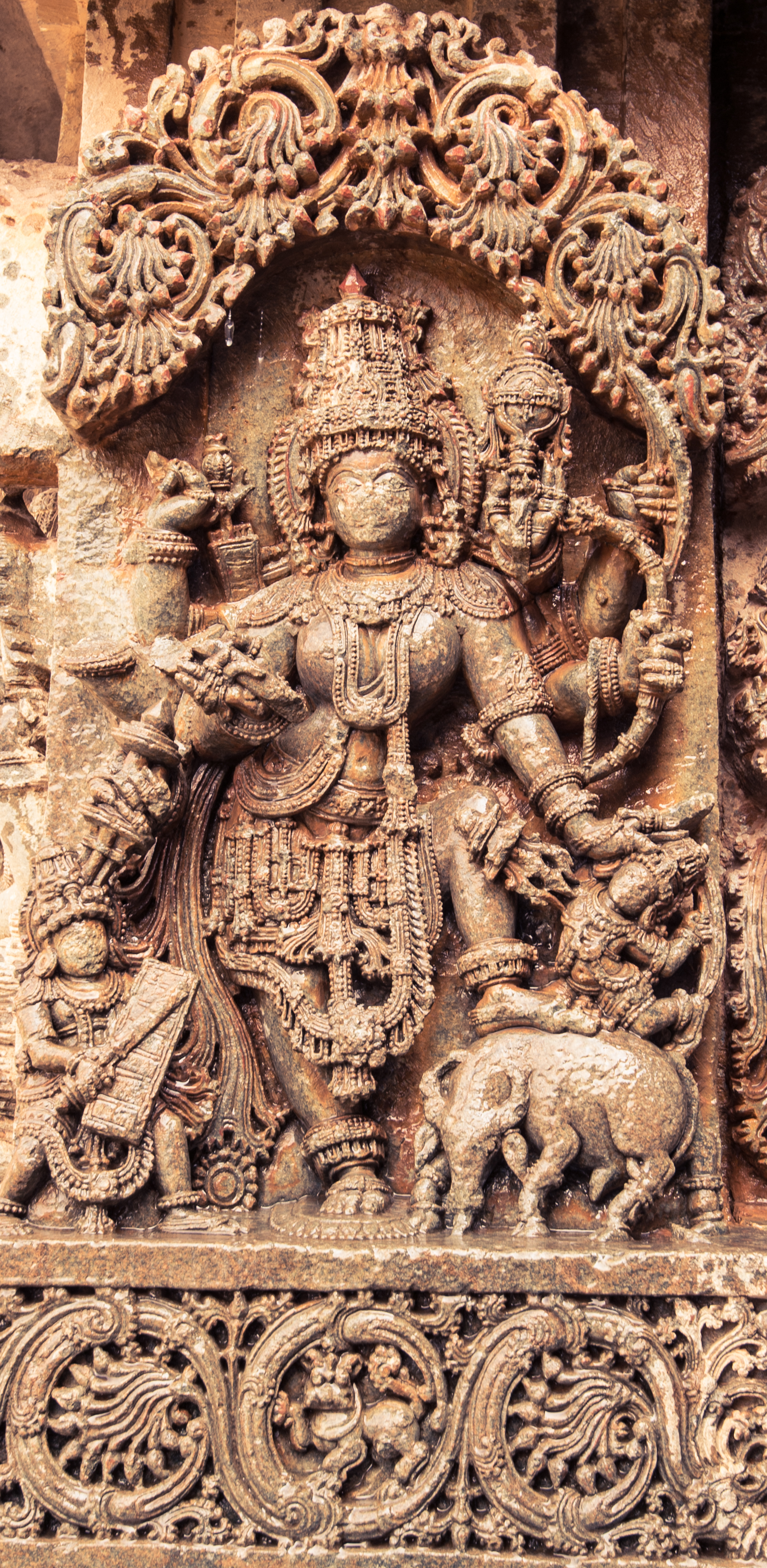
Goddess Durga, Mahisasuramardini

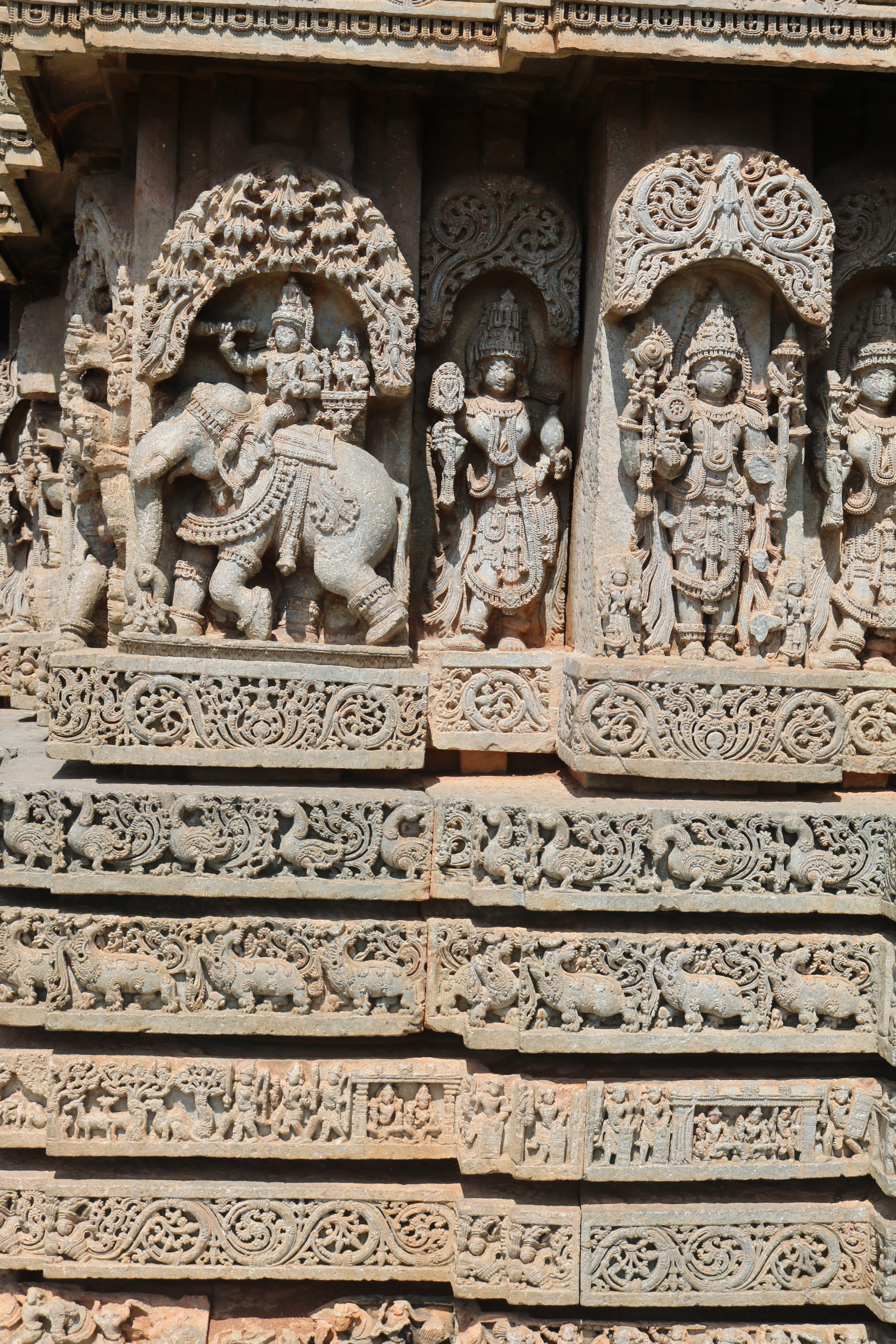
Vedic deity Indra

== See also ==
- Hosaholalu
