= Gummanahalli =

- village
- Interactive map of Gummanahalli
- Country: India
- State: Karnataka
- District: Mandya
- Talukas: Pandavapura

Government
  - Body: Gram panchayat

Population (2001)
  - Total: 5,668

Languages
  - Official: Kannada
- Time zone: UTC+5:30 (IST)
- ISO 3166 code: IN-KA
- Vehicle registration: KA
- Website: karnataka.gov.in

Gummanahalli is a village in the southern state of Karnataka, India. It is located in the Pandavapura taluk of Mandya district in Karnataka.

== Demographics ==
As of 2001 India census, Gummanahalli had a population of 5668 with 2837 males and 2831 females.

== See also ==
- Mandya
- Krishnarajpet
- Pandavapura
- Chinakurali
