= Laxmi Narayan Temple =

- Location in Orissa

Religion
- Affiliation: Hinduism
- Deity: Laxmi Narayana

Location
- Location: Bhubaneswar
- State: Orissa
- Country: India
- Interactive map of Laxmi Narayan Temple
- Coordinates: 20°15′53″N 85°51′40″E

Architecture
- Type: kalingan Kalinga Architecture
- Elevation: 17 m (56 ft)

Laxmi Narayan Temple is located in the Kapileswar temple precinct. The enshrined deity is Laxmi- Narayana seated in padmasana over a lotus pedestal. Narayana has four arms holding conch in his upper right hand, a lotus in upper left hand and lower left hand is holding a mace. Laxmi is seating on his left lap. Both the images are crowned with Kirita mukuta. Laxmi is holding a lotus. The temple has a vimana in pidha order. On plan the temple measure 1.46 m in length and on its width it is merged with the kitchen walls. The total height of the temple is 3.24 m (bada 1.34 m, gandi 1.15 m, and mastaka 0.75 m). The cella measure 0.90 square m. There is a Garuda image over a pillar in front of the temple. The doorjamb measure 1.15 m in height x 0.50 m in width. This temple is closely attached with the pathway of the kitchen.

== See also ==
- List of Hindu temples in India § Orissa
