= Hosaholalu =

Town in Mandya district, Karnataka, India

Coordinates: 12.642840°N 76.478228°E

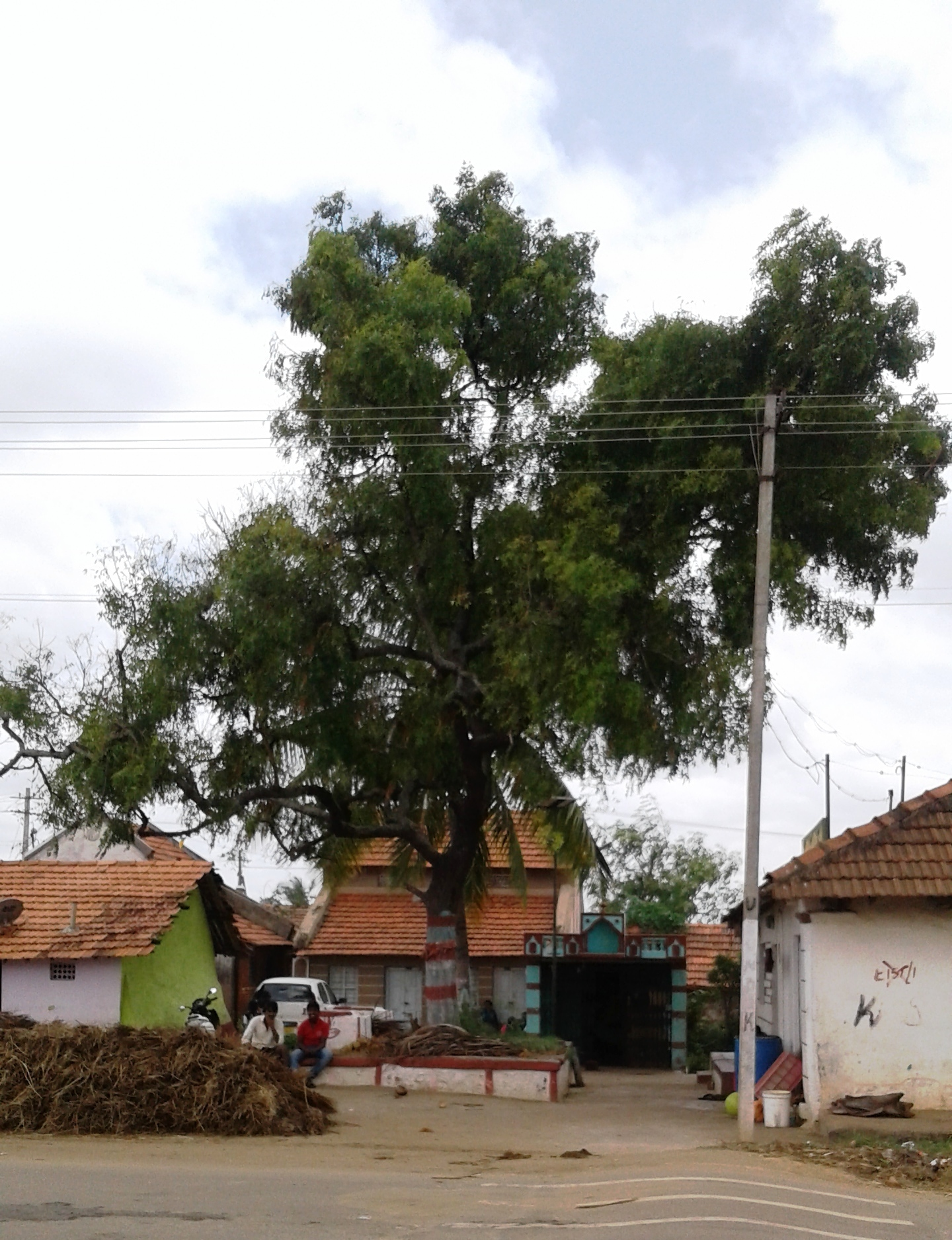
Hosaholalu Village

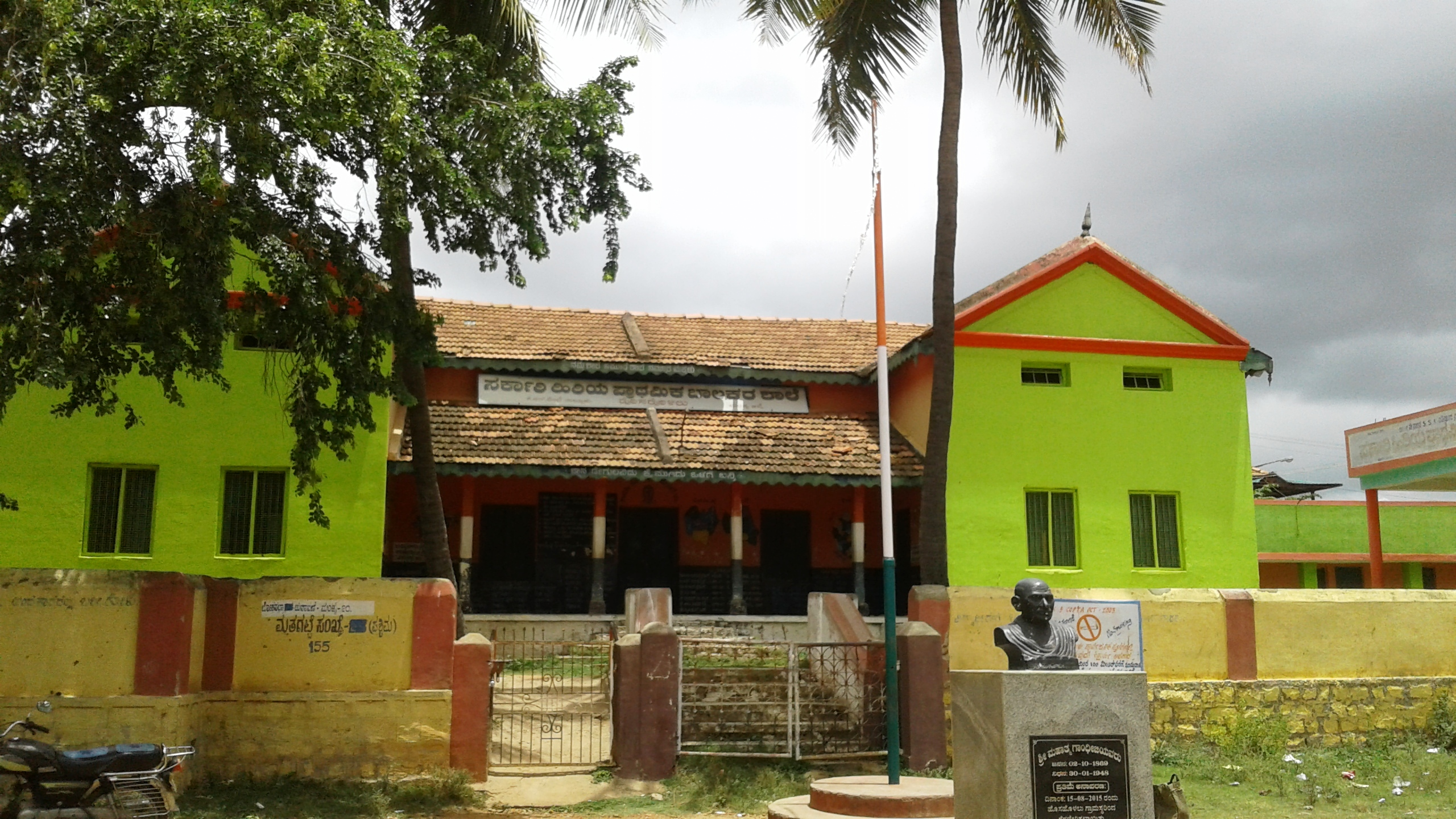
Hosaholalu school

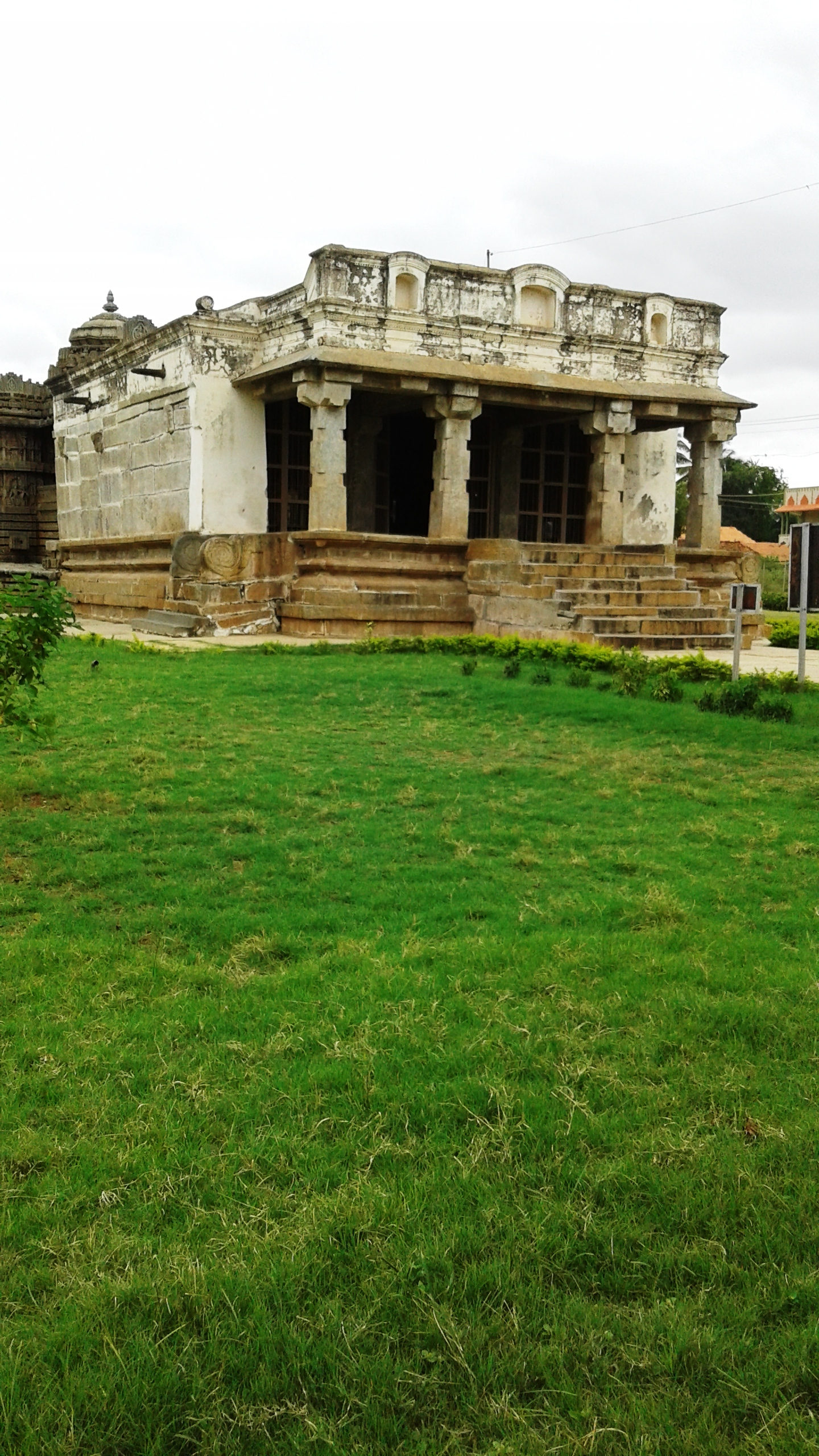
Hosaholalu Temple

Hosaholalu is a small town near Krishnarajapet in Mandya district of Karnataka state, India.

== Location ==
Hosaholalu is located two km west of Krishnarajapet town on the Bherya road.

== Lakshmi Narayana Temple ==
The Lakshminarayana Temple is located in Hosaholalu. It was built by King Vira Someshwara of the Hoysala Empire in 1250 CE. The dating of the temple is based on the style of the sculptures and architecture that compares closely with the contemporary Hoysala monuments at Javagal, Nuggehalli and Somanathapura. The town of Hosaholalu is about 60 kilometres (37 mi) from Hassan and 45 kilometres (28 mi) from the heritage city of Mysore, the cultural capital of Karnataka state.

The temple is a splendid example of a trikuta vimana (three shrined) temple though only the central shrine exhibits a tower (superstructure or Shikhara) on top. The lateral shrines are square in construction with five projections and no special features. The central shrine is well decorated and its tower has a sukanasi (called "nose") which is actually a lower tower over the vestibule that connects the shrine (cella containing the image of the deity) to the hall (mantapa). The sukanasi looks like an extension of the main tower over the central shrine. The material used for the temple construction is chloritic schist, more commonly known as Soapstone. The temple is built on a jagati (platform), a Hoysala innovation that elevates the temple by about a metre.

According to art critic Gerard Foekema, the temple as a whole exhibits the "new style" and belongs to the 2nd phase of Hoysala building activity (13th century), with two sets of eaves, and six moldings at the base of the outer wall. The first eave is located where the superstructure meets the temple outer wall and the second eave runs around the temple and about a metre below the first eave. In between the two eaves are decorative miniature towers on pilasters (called Aedicule), with sculptured wall images of Hindu deities and their attendants below the second eave. Being a Vaishnava temple (a Hindu sect), most of the images represent some form of Hindu god Vishnu, his consort and his attendants. There are a hundred and twenty such images. In all there are twenty four sculptures of Vishnu standing upright holding in his four arms the four attributes, a conch, a wheel, a lotus and a mace in all possible permutations. Below the panel of deities is the base of the wall consisting of six decorative rectangular moldings of equal width which run all around the temple.

The six horizontal mouldings are intricately sculptured and are called friezes. Seen from top to bottom; the first frieze depicts birds (hansa), the second depicts aquatic monsters (makara), the third frieze has depictions of Hindu epics and other mythological and puranic stories narrated in the clockwise direction (direction of devotee circumambulation), the fourth frieze has leafy scrolls, the fifth and sixth friezes have a procession of horses and elephants respectively. In the frieze that depicts the epics, the Ramayana starts from the western corner of the southern shrine and the Mahabharata starts from the northern side of the central shrine vividly illustrating the demise of many heroes of the famous war between Pandavas and Kauravas.

The interior of the temple consists of a closed hall (mantapa) of modest size with four polished lathe turned pillars supporting the roof. The four central pillars divide the hall into nine equal "bays" (compartments) and nine decorated ceilings. The sanctum of the three shrines contain the images of Venugopala, Narayana in the middle and Lakshminarasimha; all forms (Avatar) of Vishnu.
