= Rambhatla Lakshminarayana Sastry =

- Born: 9 December 1908; Gudivada Agraharam, Srikakulam district, India
- Died: 19 November 1995 (aged 86), Visakhapatnam
- Education: M.A., B.Ed, POL
- Alma mater: Maharajah Sanskrit College, Vizianagaram, Banaras Hindu University
- Occupations: Author, Linguist, Playwright, Translator, Speaker, Teacher
- Writing career
- Pen name: Rambhatla Lakshminarayana
- Notable works: Kalidasa Translation, Mahabharata Translation, Indian Mythology Translation

Rambhatla Lakshminarayana Sastry(b: 9 December 1908 - d: 19 November 1995) was an eminent Indian teacher, author, playwright, translator, commentator and speaker in Telugu & Sanskrit languages. Sastry's life and notable works have been documented and covered in Telugu University under Luminaries of 20th Century.

== Childhood and education ==
Sastry was born at Gudivada Agraharam in Palakonda division of Srikakulam district. He lost his father at the age of 13 years. After schooling, Sastry studied Telugu and Sanskrit languages formally. He later joined in Maharajah Government Sanskrit College, Vizianagaram and obtained PoL and M.A. degrees from Banaras Hindu University.

== Teaching career ==
He has worked as a Telugu pundit in junior colleges in Parvathipuram and Salur for a few years. He then moved to Visakhapatnam and joined as a Telugu lecturer in Mrs. A.V.N. College. Throughout the course of his teaching career Sastry has mentored hundreds of students who later went onto become scholars in the field of literature & arts. He has been credited in the doctoral thesis of Dr. S V Joga Rao who won the Telugu Sahitya Akademi award of Government of India in 1989. He has been inducted into the teaching faculty of Telugu department in Andhra University.

== Author, Translator, Commentator ==
Sastry translated some ancient Sanskrit works and Satakams such as Nindya Nirhanam, Vikramorvasiyam, Sri Ramatatwa Rasayanam, Soundarya Lahari, Vedantha Panchadasi Saaram, Kasi Satakam and Ramachandra Satakam in chaste prose and poetry in Telugu language. He has translated the Panchadasa Mantra (Tantric version of Gayatri Mantra) entitled Varivasya Rahasyamu along the Karra Srinivasa Rao. Even while he was a student at the Sanskrit College, Sastry accomplished the hard task of translating ancient Sanskrit grandhas, written commentary on many ancient literary works and satakams such as Nindya Nirhanam, Vikramorvaseyam, Sri Ramatatwa Rasayanam, Soundaryalahari, Vedantha Panchadasi Saaram, Kasi and Ramachandra Satakams to classically chaste prose and poetry in Telugu.

== Spiritual Discourses ==
Sastry gave hundreds of scholarly & spiritual discourses on works of Kalidasa and Sankaracharya besides Valmiki Ramayanam and Vyasa Bhagavatham in his lifetime at Visakhapatnam for more than 3 decades between 1969 till his last days in 1995. He hosted the popular Sookti Muktavali on All India Radio in Visakhapatnam. The hundreds of scholarly discourses on works of Kalidasa, Sankaracharya besides Valmiki Ramayanam and Vyasa Bhagavatham in his lifetime still ring the air all over the country. His Shashthipurti was grandly celebrated in 1968 by the elite of Visakhapatnam.

== Honorary Titles ==
Called ‘Abhinava Bhatta Baana’ by teacher Tata Subrahmanya Sastry while he was a student at the Sanskrit College. He was conferred many titles by literary organizations during his career like Panditaratna, Daivagya Siromani to name a few. Sastry is the founding member of the Dravida Welfare society which donated land to the construction of Kalyanamandapams in Visakhapatnam. His bust has been erected in his honor at Sri Lalita Kalyanamanapam in Visakhapatnam.

== Death ==
Sastry died on 19 November 1995 in Visakhapatnam. His birth centenary was celebrated at Sri Sadgurubrahma Ramadoota Mandiram in Madhuranagar, Visakhapatnam. Ganti Narasimha Murty organised the function in the temple premises. The birth centenary of Rambhatla Lakshminarayana Sastry was celebrated in Visakhapatnam in the year 2008. The management committee of Sri Sadgurubrahma Ramadoota Mandiram in Madhuranagar headed by Ganti Narasimha murty organised the function in the temple premises where Rambhatla delivered scores of discourses on religion and spiritualism. Scholars G. Akkubhatla Sarma, Maddulapalli Dattatreya Sastry, Bhaskara Sarma and Vedula Kasivisweswara Rao besides Appalla Someswara Sarma spoke. Sanskrit scholar Saripalli Sita was conferred the title ‘Sastravisarada’ on the occasion. Proposing a vote of thanks, Ganti Narasimham sought public help for bringing in print the three unpublished works of Sastry and also for instituting a memorial in his name.

== Media Coverage ==
Sastry was recognized as one of the 133 stalwarts from Visakhapatnam in the 2004 book "Visakha Manyulu". Sastry was also covered in the Indian national daily "The Hindu" in 2008 commemorating his centenary. Pottisriramulu Telugu University published his life and work in the " Luminaries of 20th Century".
