= Krishnaraja Pete =

Krishnarajpete
- Town
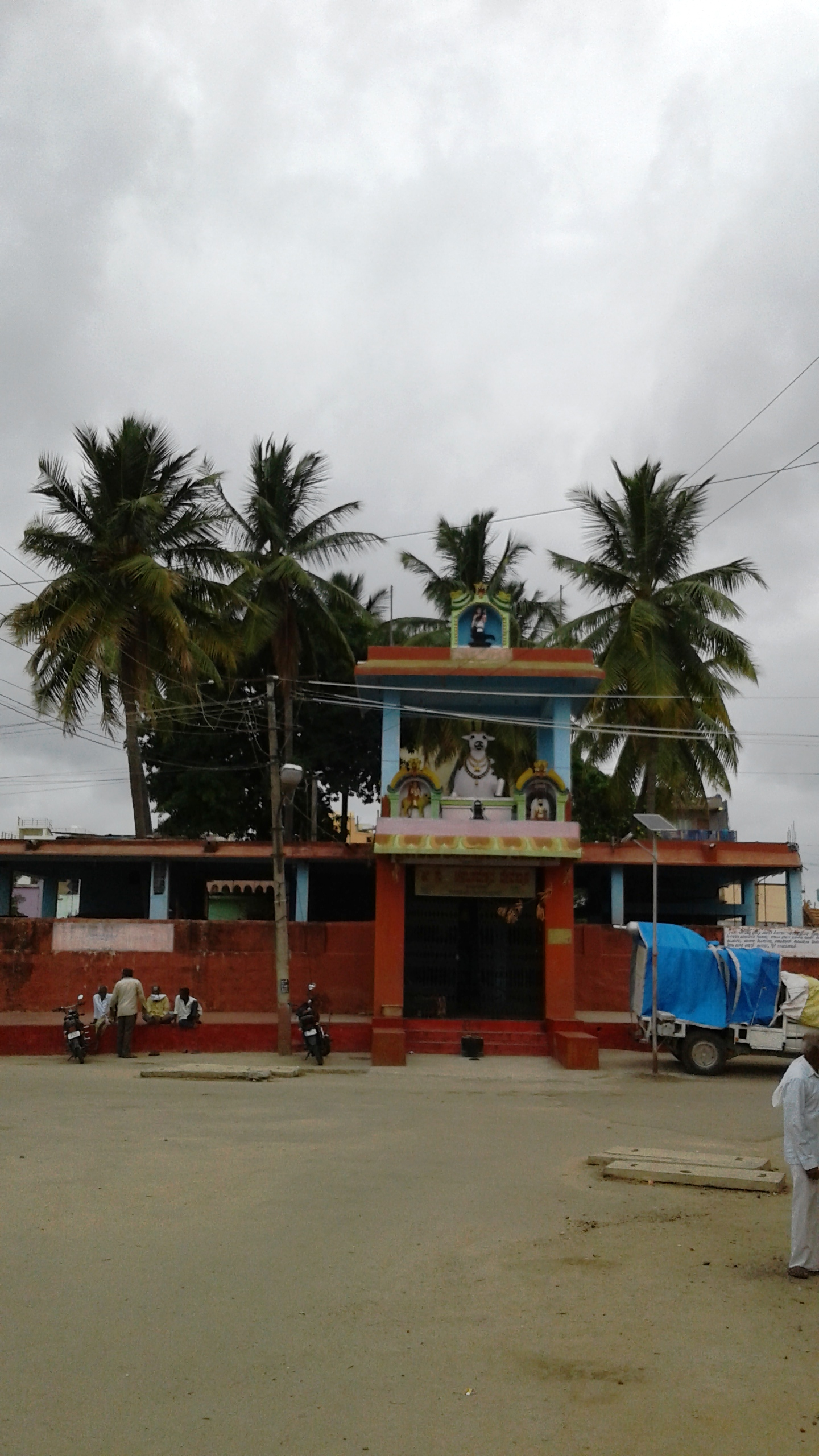
- Basavanagudi Temple in K.R.Pet
- Interactive map of Krishnarajpete
- Coordinates: 12.66°N 76.49°E
- Country: India
- State: Karnataka
- District: Mandya

Government
  - Body: Town Municipal Council

Area
  - Town: 4.26 km^{2} (1.64 sq mi)
  - Rural: 897.55 km^{2} (346.55 sq mi)
- Elevation: 790 m (2,590 ft)

Population (2011)
  - Town: 25,946
  - Density: 6,090/km^{2} (15,800/sq mi)
  - Rural: 234,533

Languages
  - Official: Kannada
- Time zone: UTC+5:30 (IST)
- PIN: 571 426
- Vehicle registration: KA-54, KA-11
- Website: www.krishnarajapetetown.mrc.gov.in

Krishnarajapete, colloquially known as K.R. Pete, is a municipality and taluk in Mandya District in the Indian state of Karnataka.

== Geography ==
Krishnarajpet is located at 12.66°N 76.49°E. It has an average elevation of 790 metres (2591 feet).

== Demographics ==
As of 2001 India census, Krishnarajpet had a population of 22,473. Males constitute 51% of the population and females 49%. Krishnarajpet has an average literacy rate of 70%, higher than the national average of 59.5%: male literacy is 77%, and female literacy is 63%. In Krishnarajpet, 12% of the population is under 6 years of age.

== Abandoned ancient temples ==
K.R. Pete and its surroundings has many ancient temples of architectural importance, built during the Hoysala reign.

One such small temple is the Hoysaleswara Temple at Thenginaghatta village. The temple is surrounded by wild bushes and banana plantations. Sadly neglected, ancient sculptures are strewn about amidst debris. The epigraph reveals the name of the temple as ‘Hoysaleswara Temple’ and being completed on 7 August 1133 AD, during the reign of the Hoysala king Narasimha. Further the inscription acknowledges Hadacala Kavanna, Hadavala Kancha, Kaleya Nayaka, Chikkate and Heggade Munjayya who had contributed towards the construction of the temple and a tank. Further it records the gifts of land made to sculptor of temple Bammoja, son of Haloja of Kikkeri.

== Gallery ==
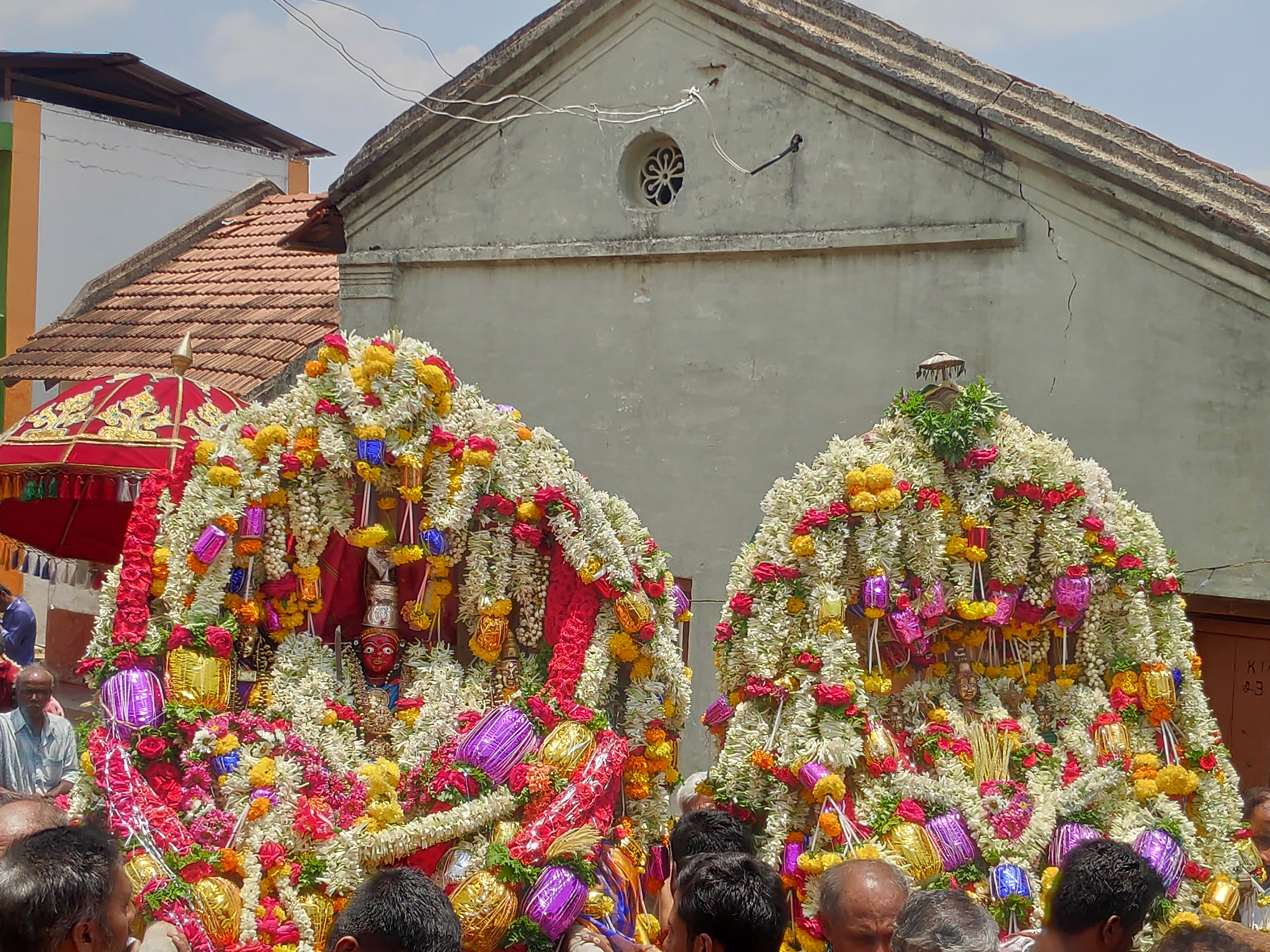

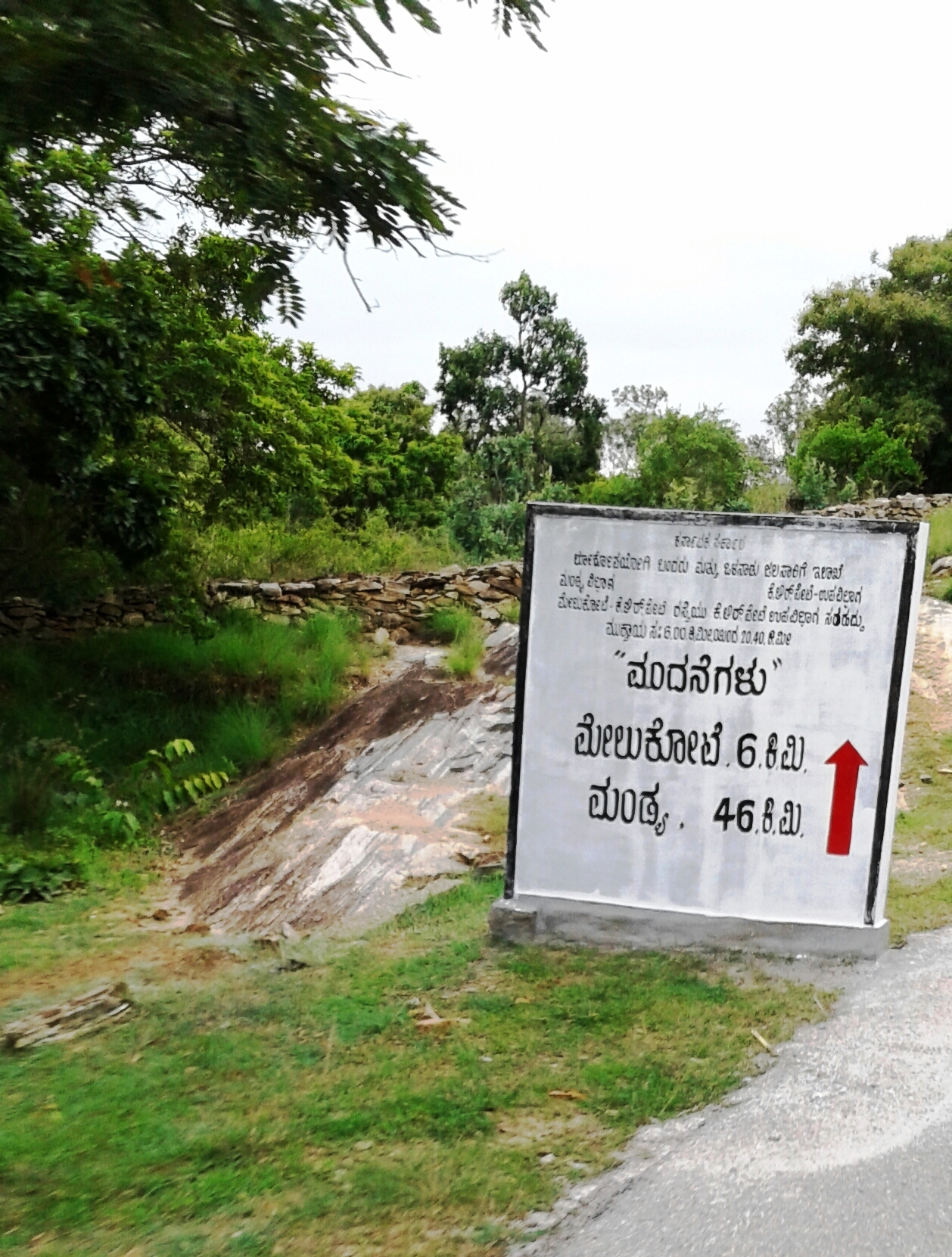
Melukote Road

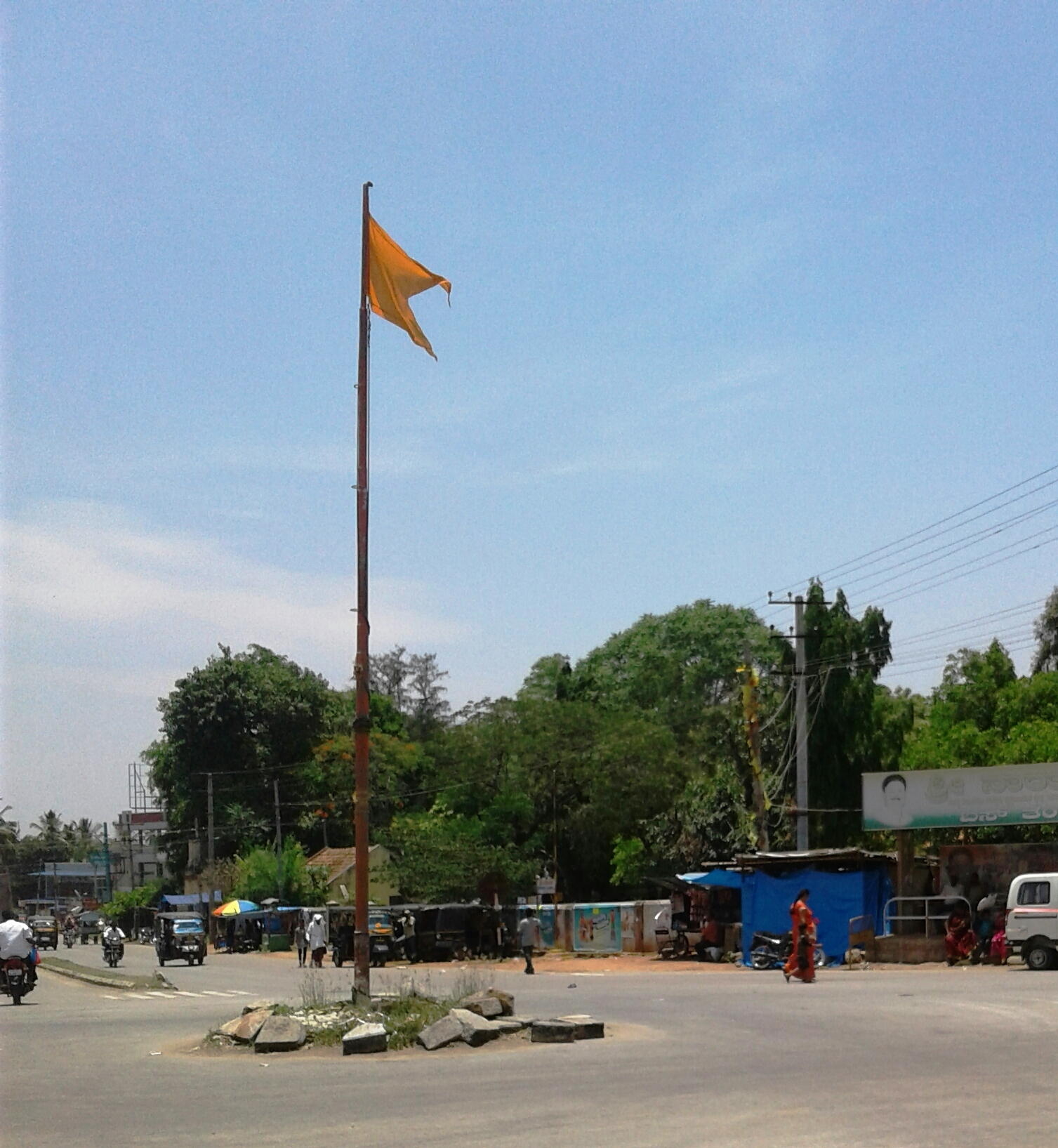
Krishnarajapet Taluk Junction

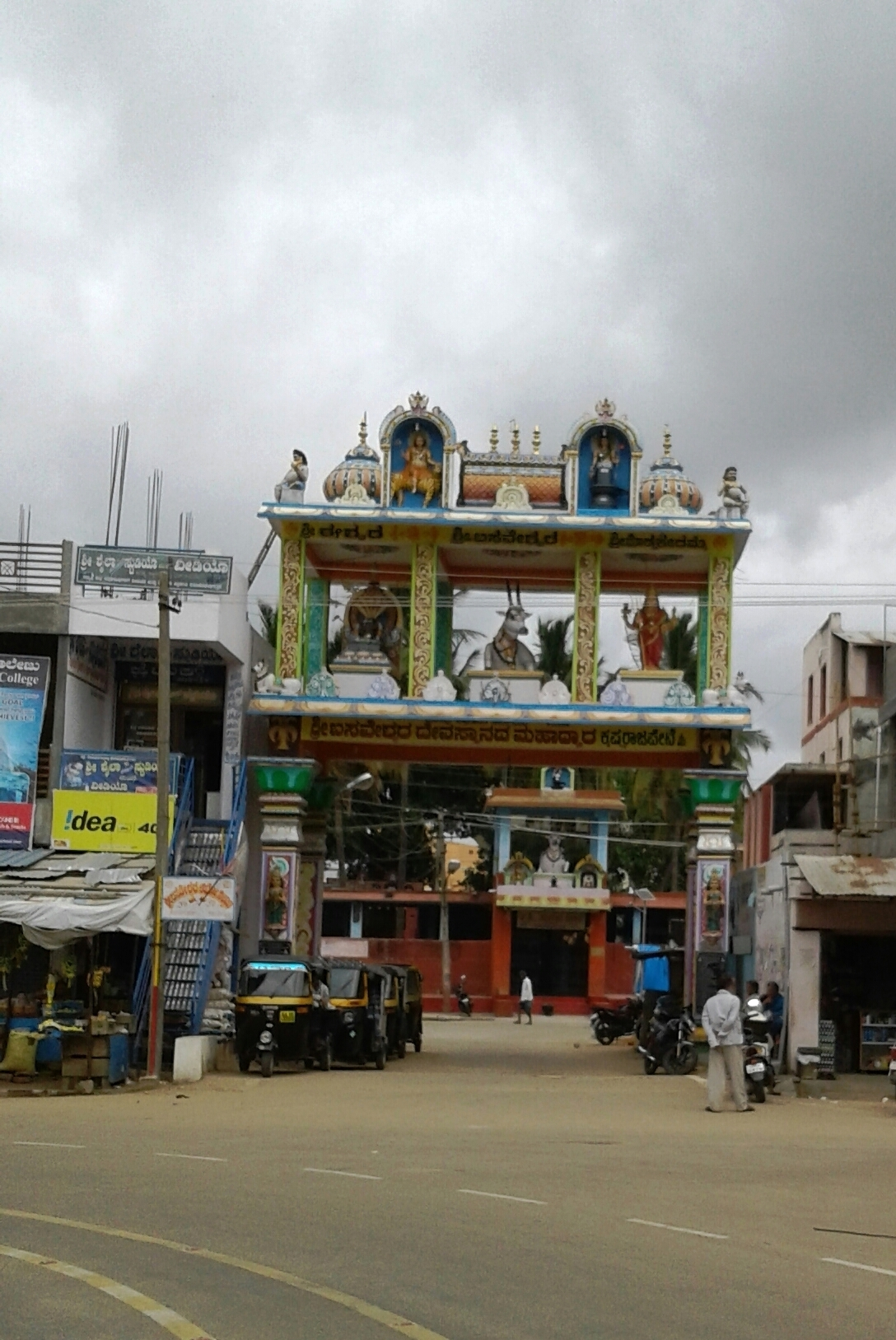
Basaveshwara

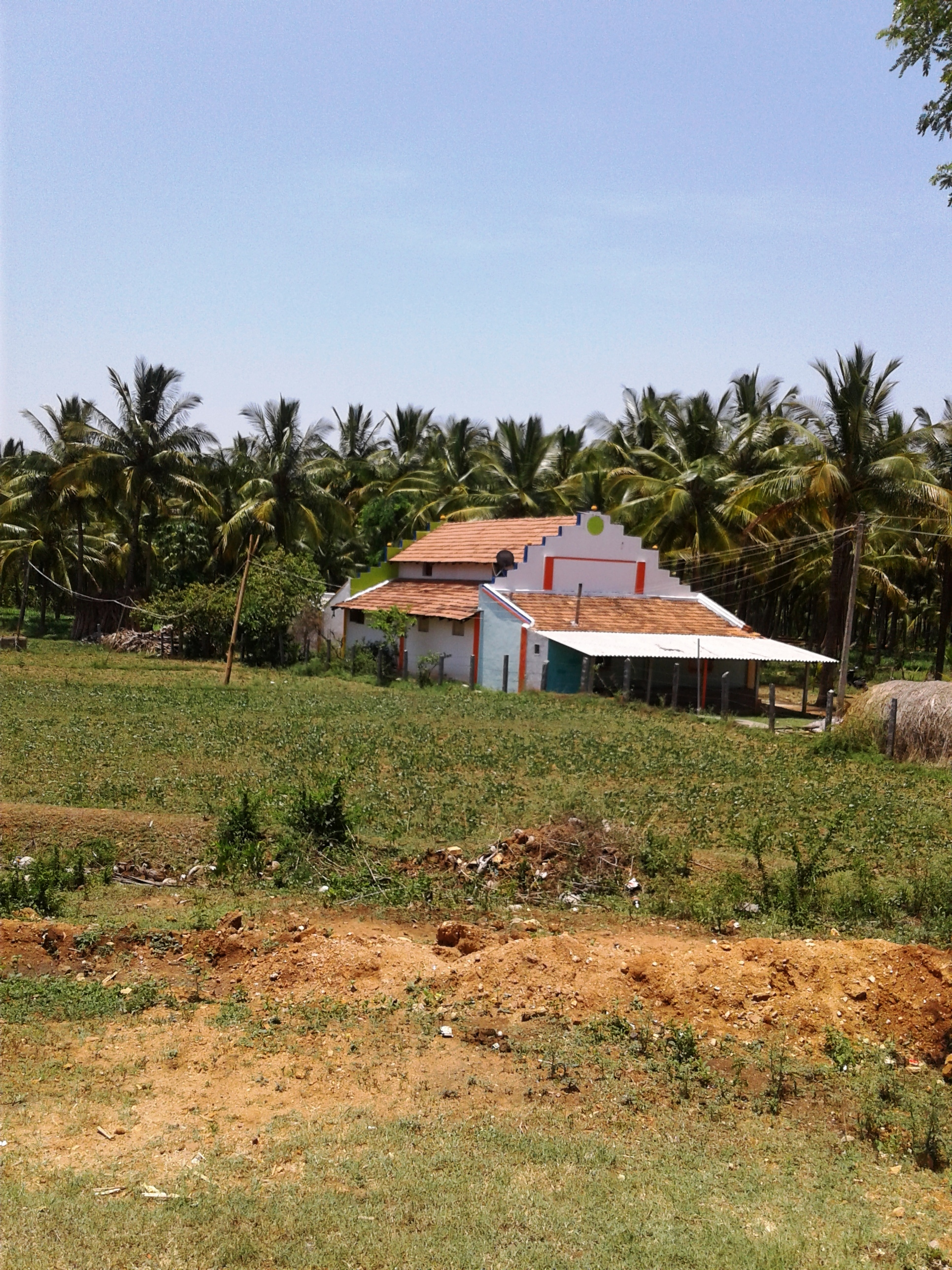
Kommanahalli

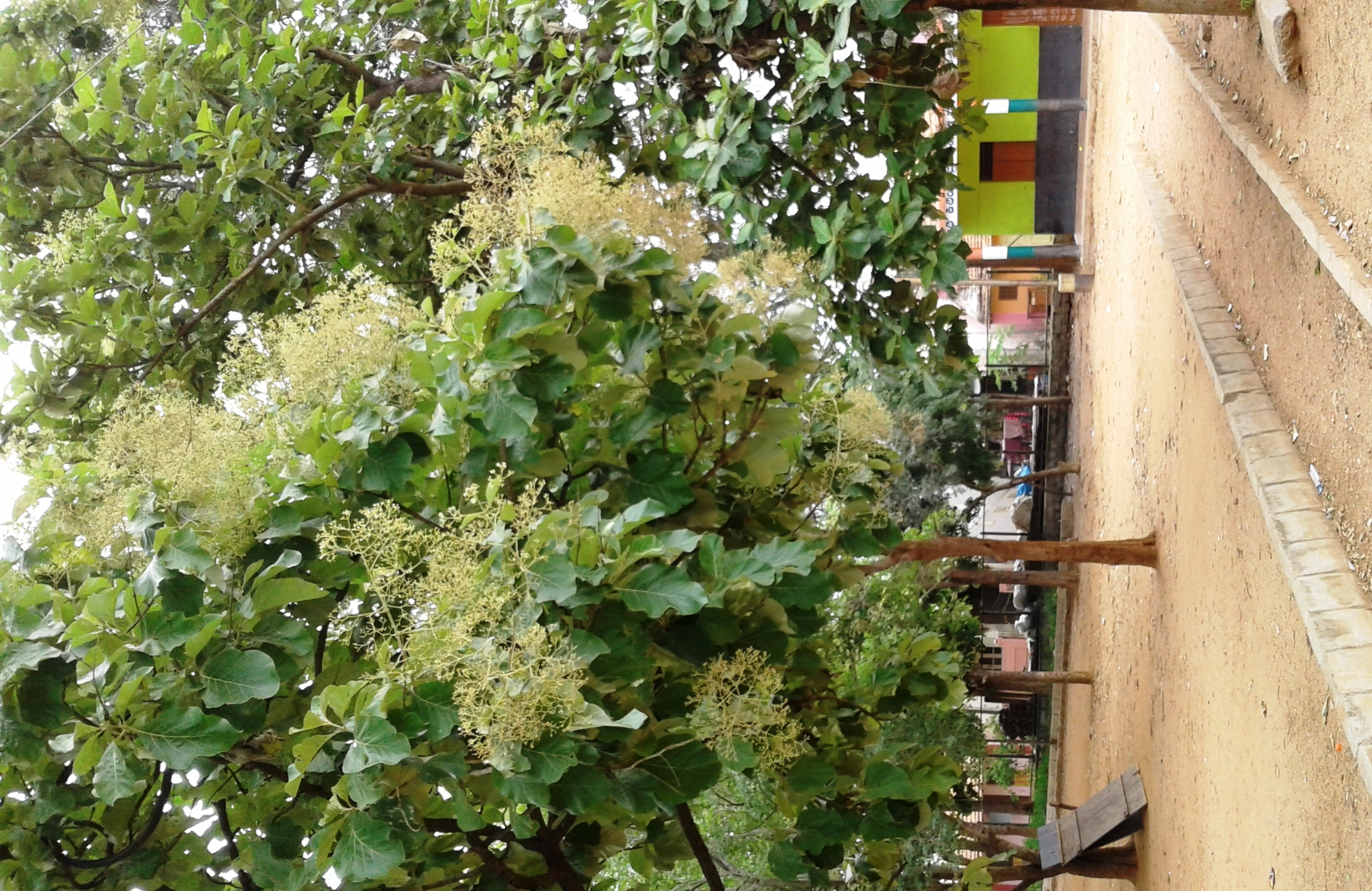
Ganapathy Park

== See also ==
- Gummanahalli
- Pandavapura
- Chinakurali
- Kikkeri
- Hosaholalu
