= Shrirangapattana railway station =

Railway station in Karnataka, India

Shrirangapattana
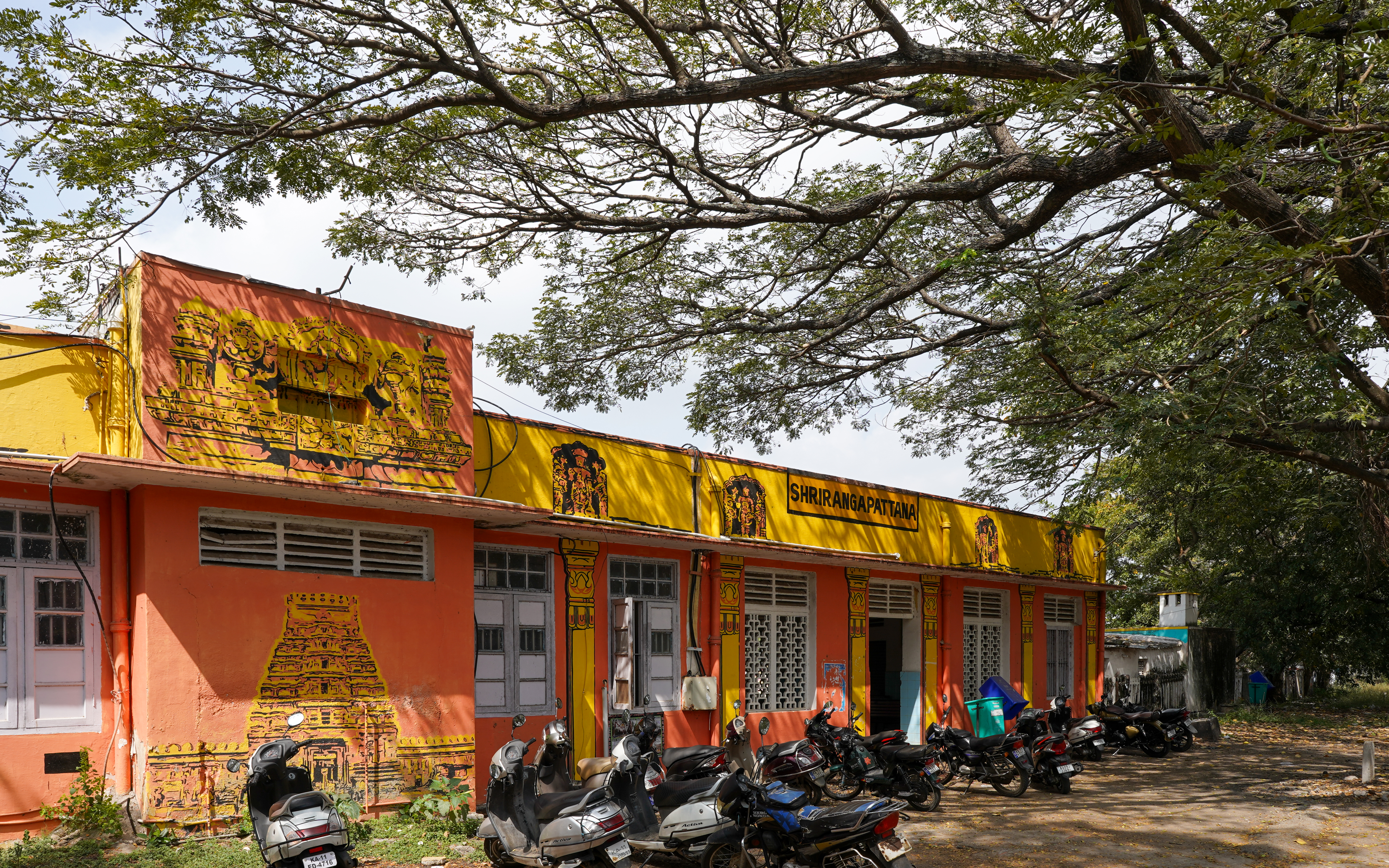
- Front view of station

General information
- Location: Shrirangapattana, Mandya district, Karnataka; India
- Coordinates: 12.4248°N 76.6782°E
- Elevation: 690 metres (2,260 ft)
- System: Indian Railways station
- Owner: Indian Railways
- Operator: South Western Railway zone
- Line: Mysore–Bangalore railway line
- Platforms: 2
- Tracks: 2
- Connections: Auto stand

Construction
- Structure type: Standard (on-ground station)
- Parking: Yes
- Cycle facilities: Yes

Other information
- Status: Functioning
- Station code: S
- Zone(s): South Western Railway zone
- Division(s): Bangalore
Route map
Location

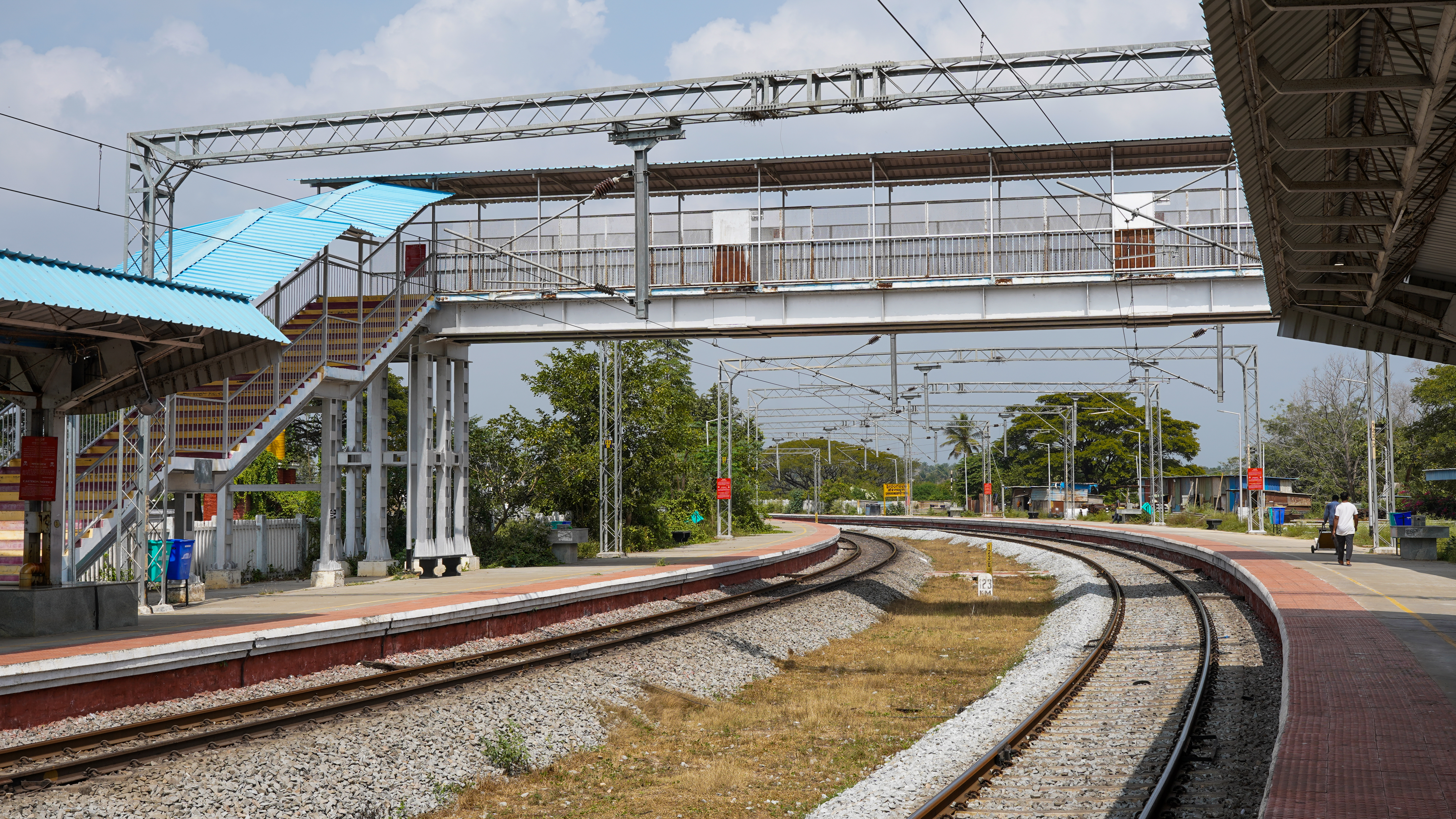
Platforms 1 (right) and 2 (left)

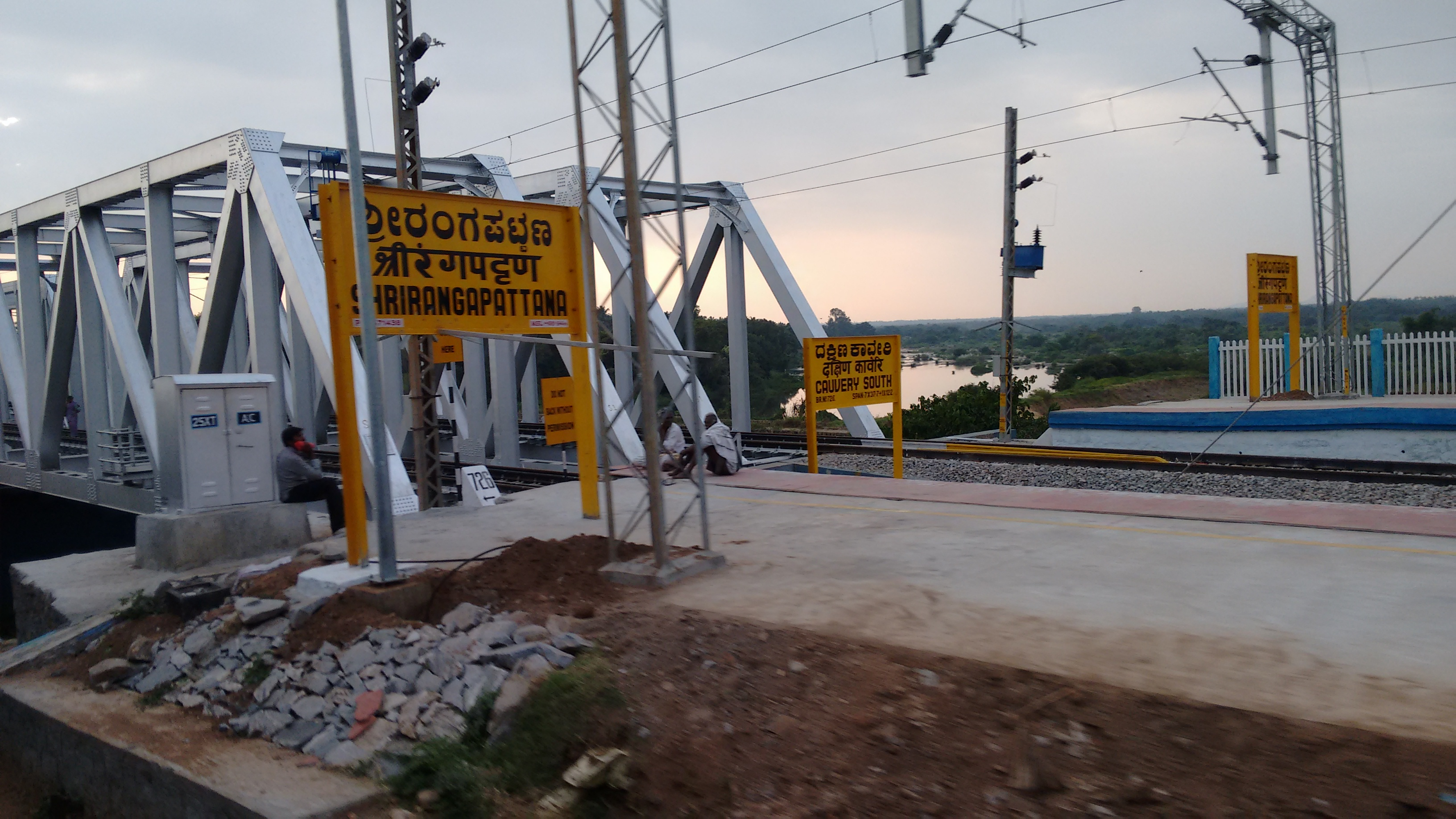
Shrirangapattana railway station platform South end

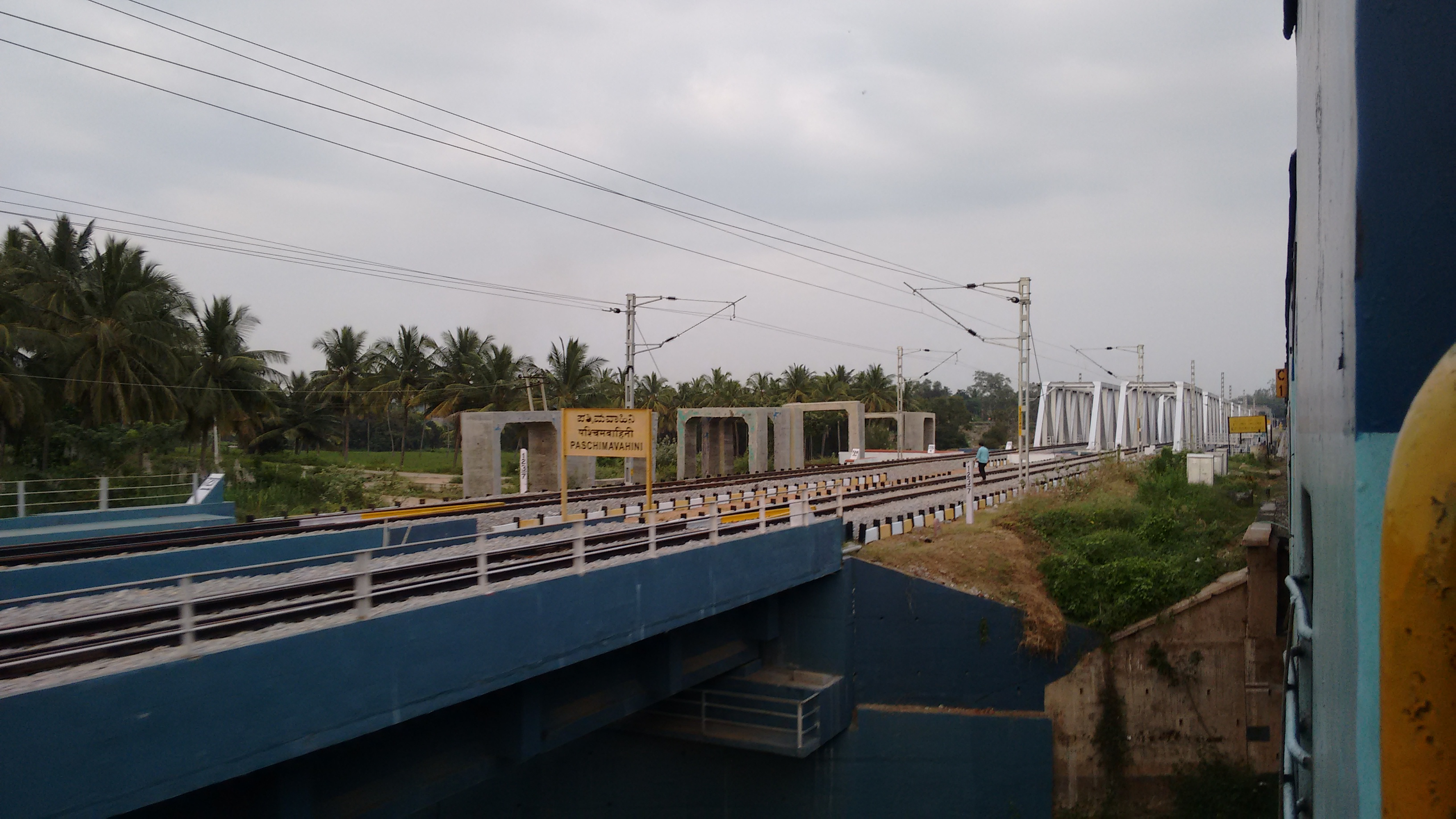
Paschimavahini Shrirangapattana railway Bridge

Shrirangapattana railway station (station code: S, also Srirangapatna) is a railway station on the Mysore–Bangalore railway line in Mandya district in the state of Karnataka in south India.

== Mysore railway division ==
Mysore railway division is one of the three railway divisions under South Western Railway zone of Indian Railways. This railway division was formed on 5 November 1951 and its headquarters is located at Mysore in the state of Karnataka in India.

Bangalore railway division and Hubli railway division are the other railway divisions under SWR Zone headquartered at Hubli. The South Western Railway is one of the seventeen Indian Railways zones in India. It is headquartered at Hubballi and comprises three divisions namely Hubli, Mysore, and Bangalore.

== See also ==
- Naganahalli
- Pandavapura
- Chandagiri Koppal
- Byadarahalli
- Yeliyur
- Mandya
- Mysore–Bangalore railway line
