= Jakkanahalli =

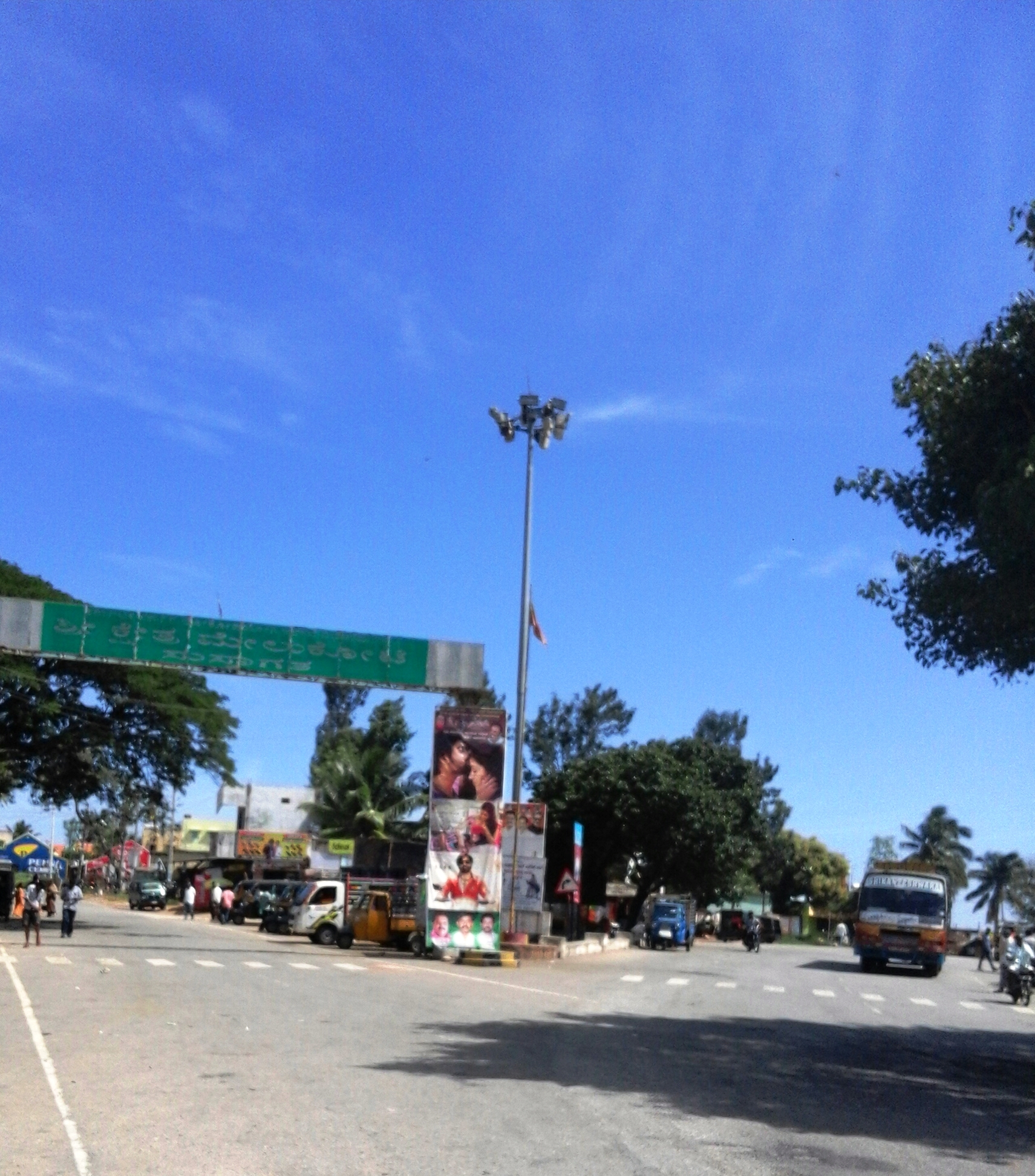
- Jakkanahalli Cross
- Interactive map of Jakkanahalli
- Coordinates: 12.66111°N 76.68320°E
- Country: India
- State: Karnataka
- District: Mandya
- Time zone: UTC+5:25 (IST)
- PIN: 571434
- Telephone code: 08262
- Vehicle registration: KA

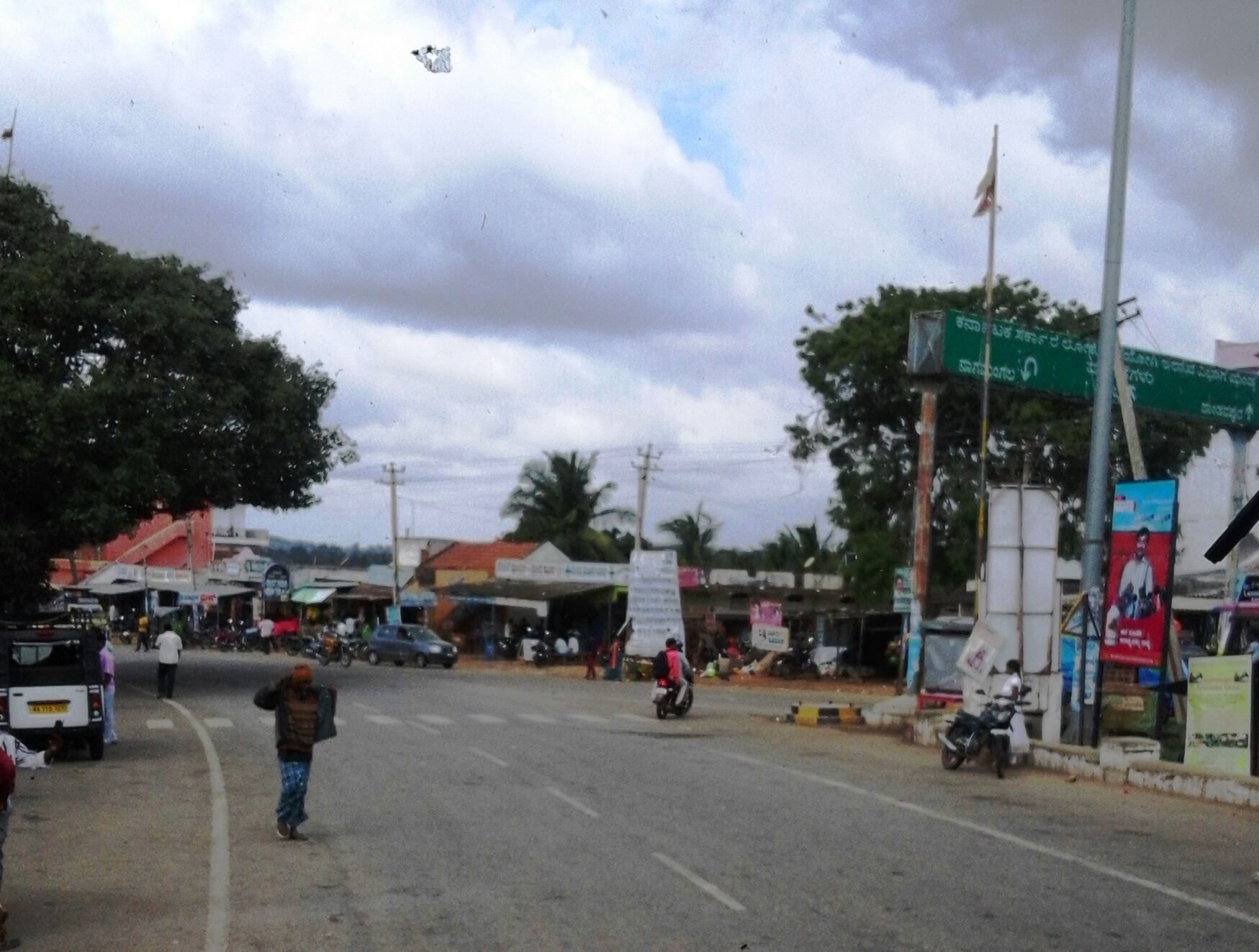
Jakkanahalli junction

Jakkanahalli is a small village in Mandya district of Karnataka state, India.

== Location ==
Jakkanahalli is located between Nagamangala and Pandavapura near to Melukote.

== Post office ==
There is a post office in Jakkanahalli and the pin code is 571431.

== Distance ==
Jakkanahalli is about 32 km from the district headquarters of Mandya and 20 km from the nearest town of Pandavapura. It is 122 km from Bangalore, the state capital. Jakkanahalli Pin code is 571807 and postal head office is Kirangoor .

== Villages and suburbs ==
- Chinya - 6 km
- G.Malligere - 8 km
- Halebeedu - 8 km
- Muthegere - 13 km
- Haralahalli - 13 km

== Railway Station ==
The nearest railway station is pandavapura at a distance of 18 km.

== Education ==
Vijaya College, Pandavapura. Kitturu Rani Channamma School, Halebeedu. B.Capital School, Manikana Hally. Morarji HP School, Pandavapura. Vidyanikethana Highschool, Y.H.Koppalu.

== See also ==
- Yeliyur
