= Naganahalli =

Village in Karnataka, India

Coordinates: 12.379055°N 76.651478°E

Naganahalli is a small village in Mysuru district of Karnataka state, India.

== Location ==
Naganahalli is located near Metgully township outside the ringroad near Mysore city. The village is on Mysore-Bangalore highway.

== Post office ==
There is a post office in the village and the postal code is 570003.

== Transportation ==
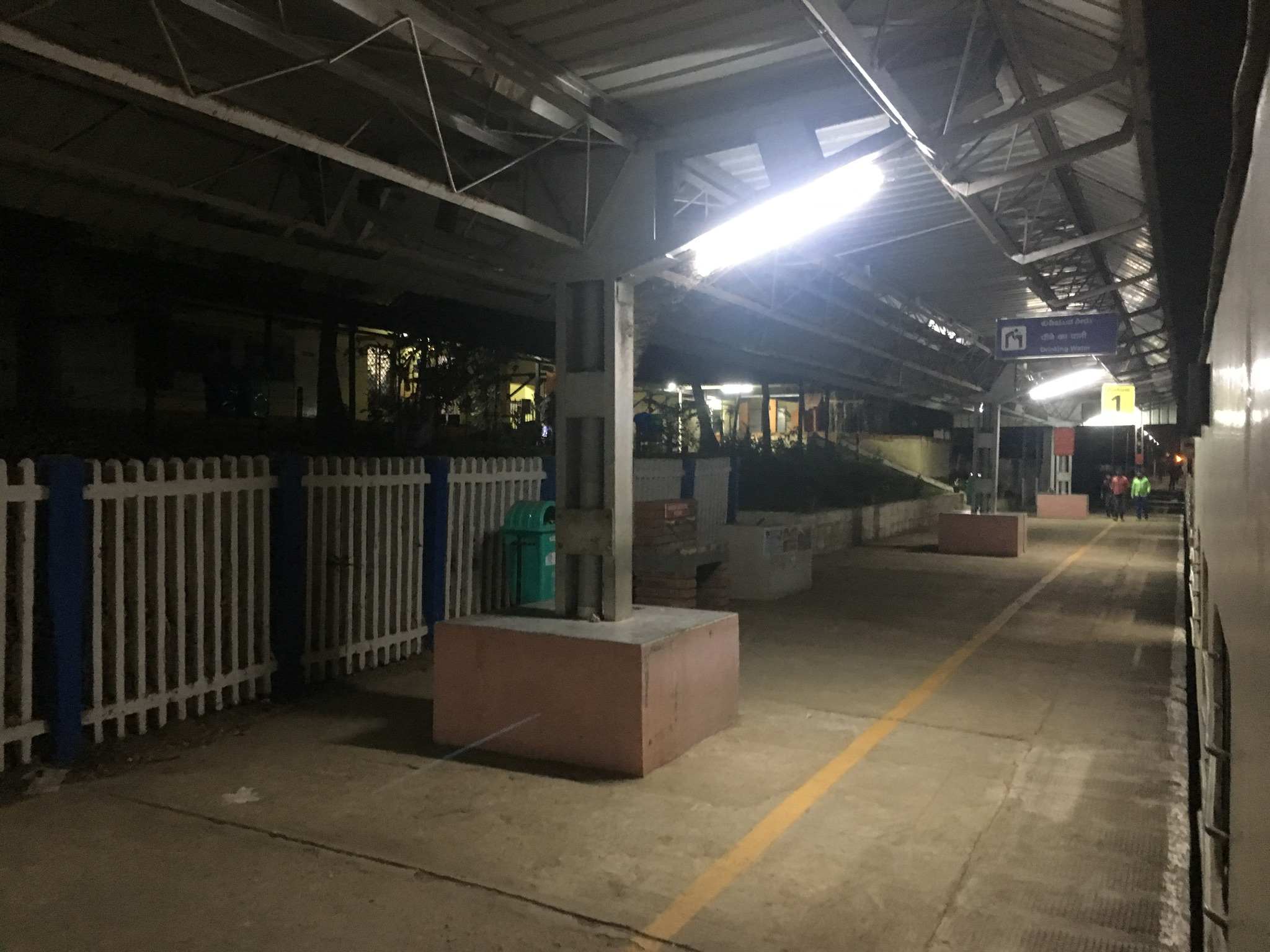
Naganahalli railway station

There is a railway station in Naganahalli which comes under Mysore - Bangalore line. Only a few slow trains stop here.

== Watershed project ==
Naganahalli Watershed project is a program of the provincial government to irrigate 370 hectares of land in Naganahalli area. Prevention of soil erosion and check dams, culverts, farm ponds and bunds are some of the initiatives of this project.

== See also ==
- Shrirangapattana
- Pandavapura
- Chandagiri Koppal
- Byadarahalli
- Yeliyur
- Mandya
- Mysore–Bangalore railway line
