= Station code =

Brief abbreviation identifying a train station

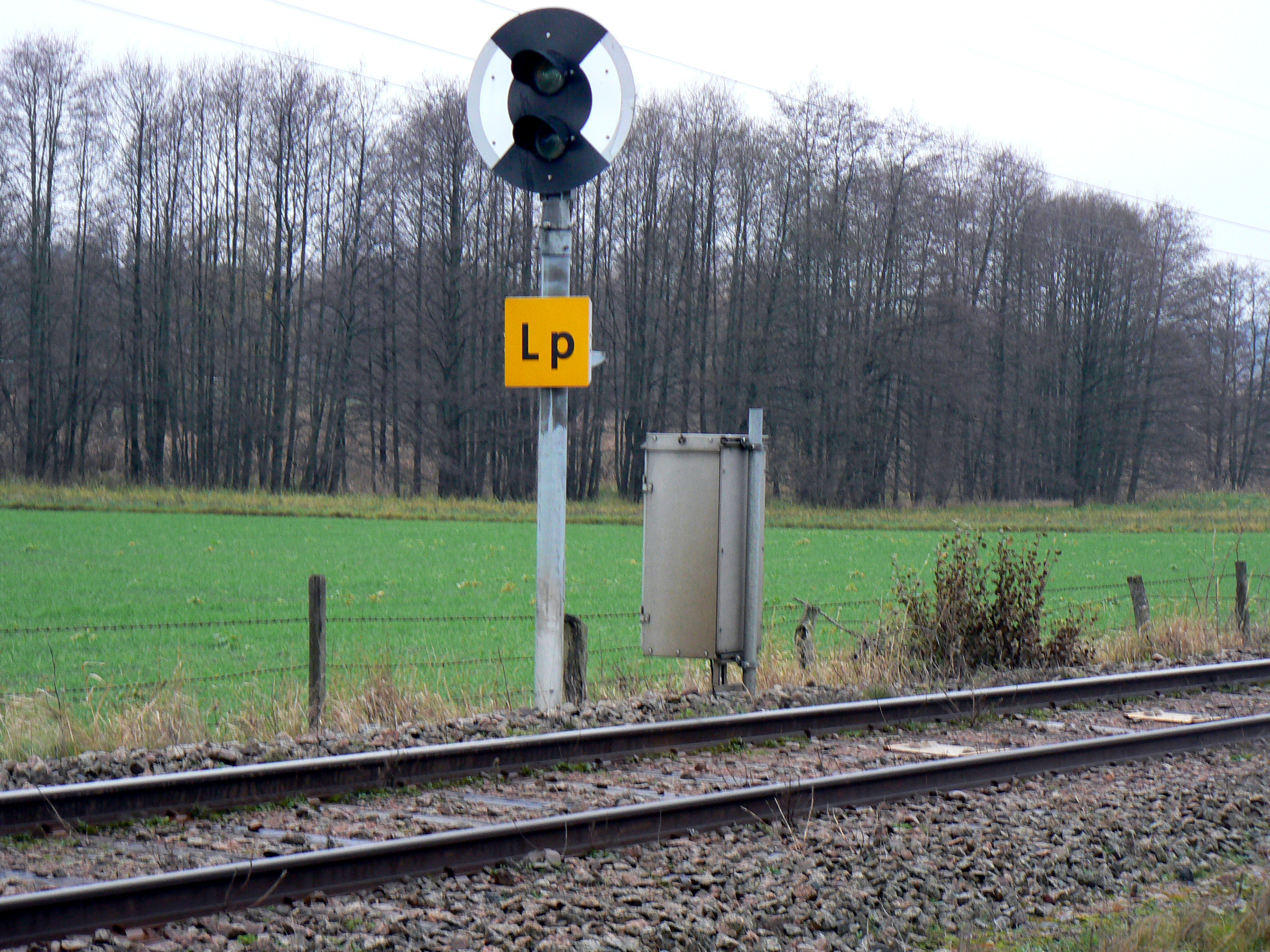
Station code Lp for Linköping Central Station in Sweden

A station code is a brief, standardised abbreviation, or alphanumeric code, used by railways to uniquely identify a railway station (within a country or region). Codes are mostly used internally but can be seen on railway traffic signs and on some timetables.

In most countries, station codes are purely alphabetic, usually comprising a few capital letters for ease of identification, in some countries one capital and one or some lowercase letters.

== Americas ==
=== United States ===
Amtrak encodes a few stations in Canada which it serves.

== Asia ==
=== Hong Kong ===
A three-letter code system is in use in the MTR to identify stations. For example, Whampoa station of the MTR has the code WHA.

=== India ===
Indian Railways uses one- to four-letter codes. Most stations of the Indian Railways are assigned three letter codes, for example, the station code for Mumbai Central station is MMCT and for Guwahati is GHY.

One-letter station codes of the Indian Railways

- G: Gondia Junction railway station
- J: Jalna railway station
- R: Raipur Junction railway station
- S: Shrirangapattana railway station
- Y: Yeliyur railway station
- Unallocated one-letter station codes of the Indian Railways include A, B, C, D, E, F, I, H, K, L, M, N, P, Q, T, U, V, W, X and Z.

=== Japan ===
In Japan, alphabetic station codes are not used. Japanese railways use station numbering, a sign system which assigns station codes consisting of a few letters and numbers to train stations.

Examples of station numbers
M-05	Shin-nakano station on the Tokyo Metro Marunouchi Line
OM-16	Mizonokuchi station on the Tokyu Ōimachi Line
JY19	Harajuku station on the Yamanote Line

=== South Korea ===
In South Korea, station codes are purely numeric, to reduce the problem of language and writing system barriers. For example, Seoul Metropolitan Subway's Singeumho station has the code of 538.

== Europe ==
=== Denmark and Sweden ===
In Sweden and Denmark, railway stations are assigned a capital letter followed by a sequence of lowercase letters that represent the station's name. For example, Stockholm commuter rail's Stockholm City railway station has the station code Sci. In Sweden the code is in a few cases a single capital letter, such as M for Malmö Central Station. A special case in Sweden since the 19th century is older stations in Stockholm, where the first capital letter says which station it is, and after that "st", for example Cst for Stockholm Central Station and Sst for Stockholm South Station, because it was considered easier to recognise in telegraphy.

=== Germany ===
Deutsche Bahn in Germany uses an alphabetic station code system called the DS 100 code, for example, Luckenwalde station in Brandenburg has the station code BLD.

=== Norway ===
Stations normally have a code of three capital letters, sometimes two letters. They are called "stedskoder" (location codes). Examples: OSL=Oslo Central Station, GAR=Oslo Airport Station, TND=Trondheim Central Station and BO=Bodø Station.

=== UK ===
Three-letter alpha codes (formerly called CRS codes - Computer Reservation System) are issued by National Rail which is responsible for railways in Great Britain. Station codes are not used by Northern Ireland Railways for stations in Northern Ireland.

In England, Scotland and Wales of the UK, railway stations are assigned three-letter codes and are issued by National Rail and are called the Computer Reservation System (CRS).

== See also ==
- Station numbering
