= MGR Chennai Central–Mysuru Junction Vande Bharat Express =

Vande Bharat Express train route in India

MGR Chennai Central - Mysuru Junction Vande Bharat Express

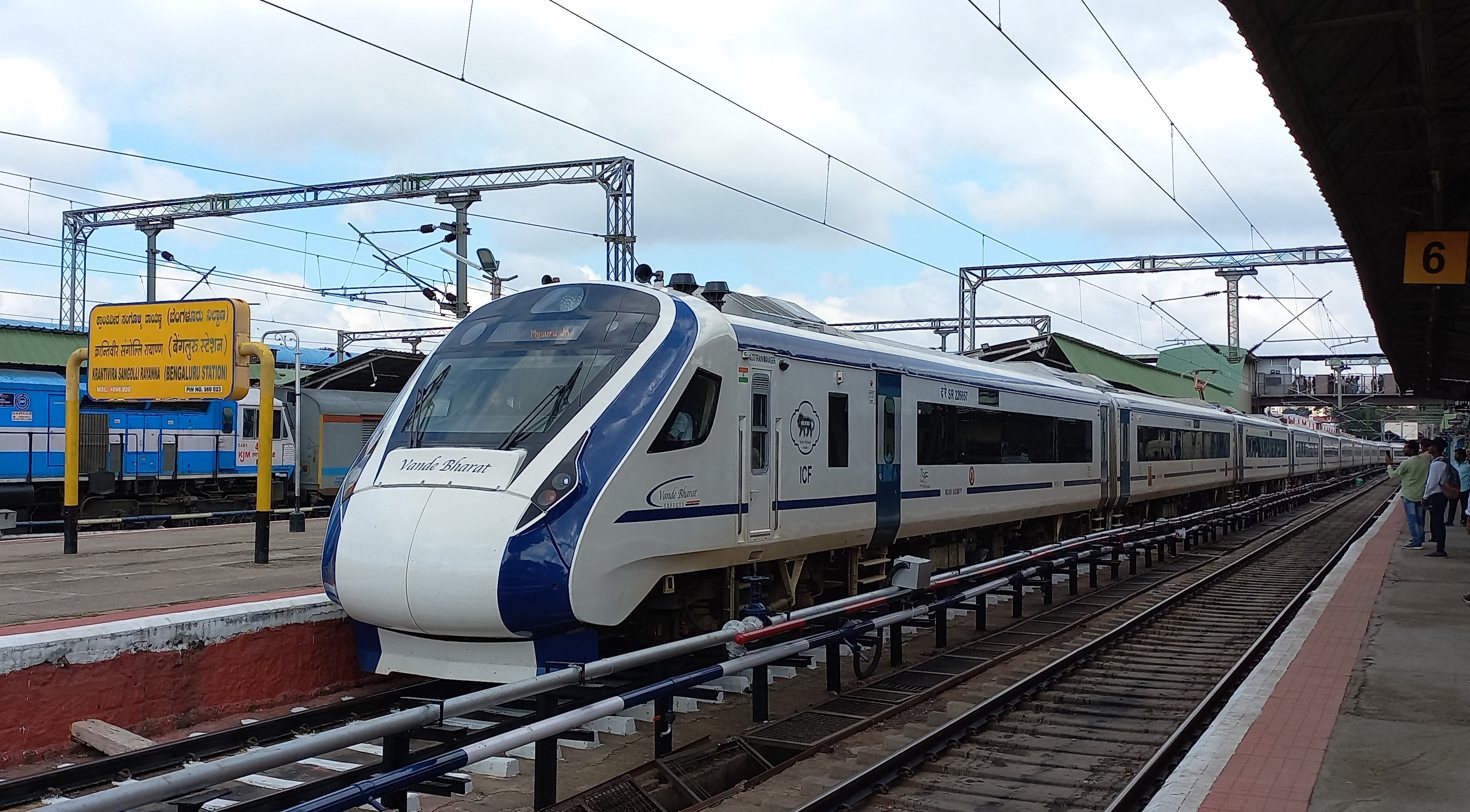
- 5th Vande Bharat Express departing from KSR Bengaluru City Jn railway station

Overview
- Service type: Vande Bharat Express
- Locale: Tamil Nadu and Karnataka
- First service: 11 November 2022 (Inaugural run); 12 November 2022; 4 years ago (Commercial run)
- Current operator: Southern Railway (SR)

Route
- Termini: MGR Chennai Central (MAS); Mysore Junction (MYS)
- Stops: 2
- Distance travelled: 497 km (309 mi)
- Average journey time: 06 hrs 30 mins
- Service frequency: Six days a week (Note: Except Wednesdays)
- Train number: 20607 / 20608
- Lines used: MGR Chennai Central–KSR Bengaluru Line; KSR Bengaluru–Mysore Line

On-board services
- Classes: AC Chair Car, AC Executive Chair Car
- Seating arrangements: Airline style; Rotatable seats
- Sleeping arrangements: No
- Catering facilities: On-board catering
- Observation facilities: Large windows in all coaches
- Entertainment facilities: On-board WiFi; Infotainment System; Electric outlets; Reading light; Seat Pockets; Bottle Holder; Tray Table
- Baggage facilities: Overhead racks
- Other facilities: Kavach

Technical
- Rolling stock: Vande Bharat 2.0
- Track gauge: Indian gauge 1,676 mm (5 ft 6 in) broad gauge
- Electrification: 25 kV 50 Hz AC Overhead line
- Operating speed: 79 km/h (49 mph) (Avg.)
- Average length: 384 metres (1,260 ft) (16 coaches)
- Track owner: Indian Railways
- Rake maintenance: Basin Bridge Junction (BBQ)

The 20607/20608 MGR Chennai Central - Mysuru Vande Bharat Express is India's 5th Vande Bharat Express train, connecting the states of Tamil Nadu and Karnataka.

== Overview ==
This train is operated by Indian Railways, connecting MGR Chennai Central, Katpadi Jn, KSR Bengaluru City Jn and Mysuru Jn. It is currently operated with train numbers 20607/20608 on 6 days a week basis.

== Rakes ==
It is the third 2nd Generation Vande Bharat Express train and was designed and manufactured by the Integral Coach Factory (ICF) under the leadership of Sudhanshu Mani at Perambur, Chennai under the Make in India initiative.

== Service ==
The 20607/20608 MGR Chennai Ctrl - Mysuru Jn Vande Bharat Express operates six days a week except Wednesdays, covering a distance of 497 km (309 mi) in a travel time of 6 hours with an average speed of 76 km/h (47 mph). The service has 2 intermediate stops. The Maximum Permissible Speed is 130 km/h (81 mph).

== Gallery ==
Some of the pictures of this express train shown below:-

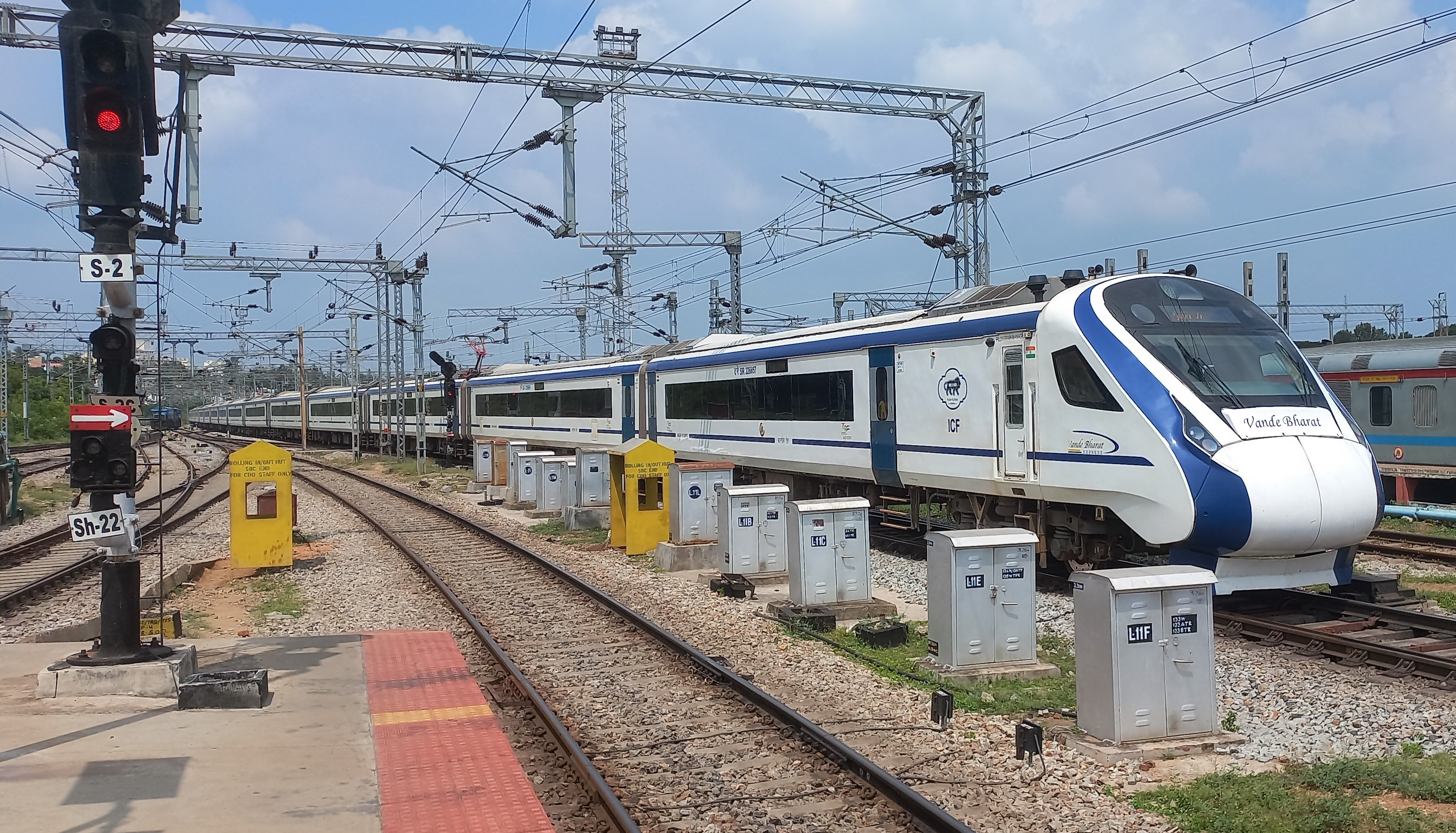
This Vande Bharat Express train arriving at Mysuru Junction railway station

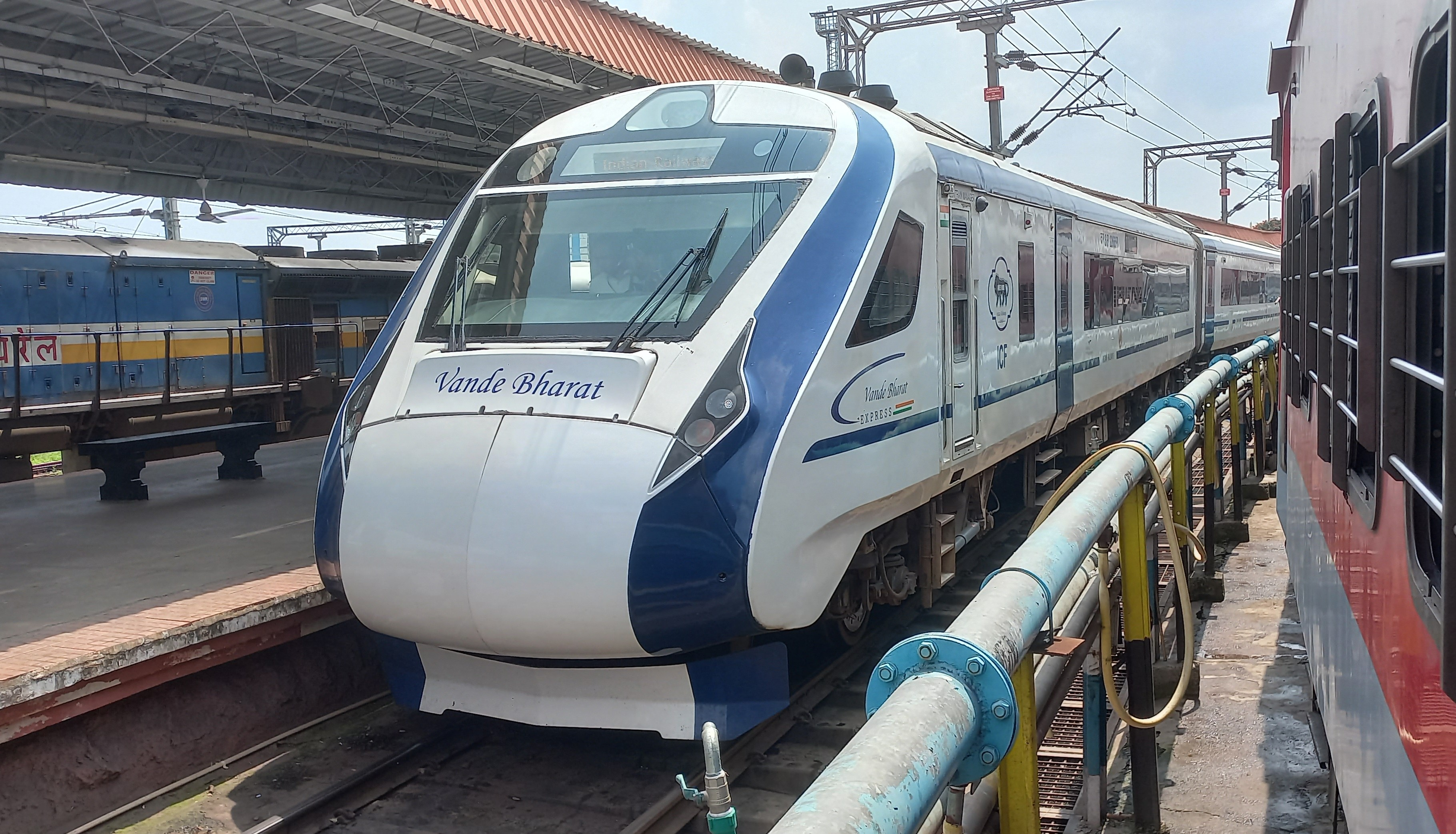
This Vande Bharat Express train on standby at Mysuru Junction railway station

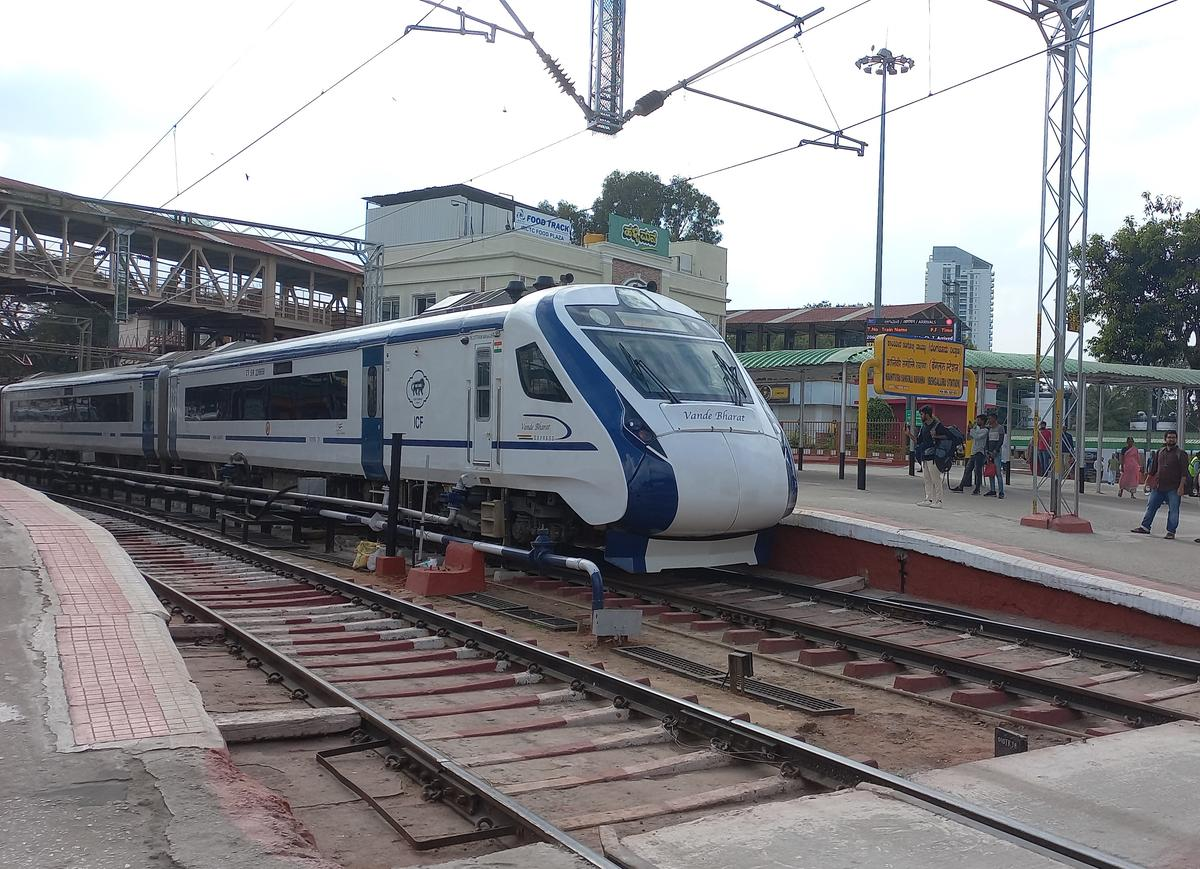
This Vande Bharat Express train departing from KSR Bengaluru City Jn and heading towards Chennai Central

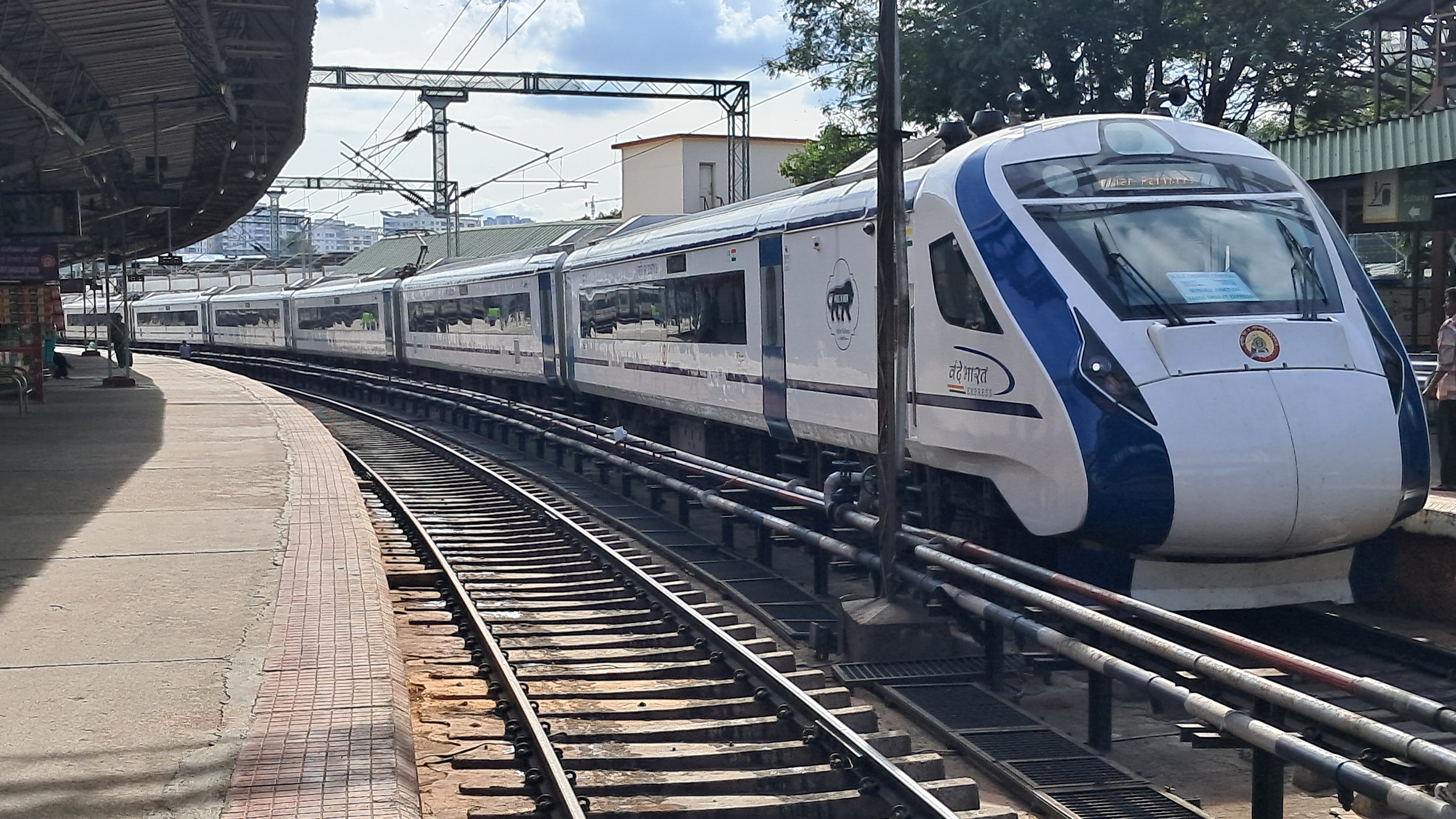
This Vande Bharat Express train on standby at KSR Bengaluru City Jn railway station

== Incidents ==
Nearly a week after the flagging of the 5th Vande Bharat Express train, the express train had met with a cattle incident. This happened during the month of November between Katpadi - Chennai section where the calf died and due to this, it suffered a dent in the front part of the locomotive. No casualties were reported during that incident.

== See also ==
- Mysuru Junction–MGR Chennai Central Vande Bharat Express
- Vande Bharat Express
- Tejas Express
- Gatimaan Express
- Chennai Central railway station
- Mysuru Junction railway station
