= Yeliyur =

Village in Mandya, Karnataka, India

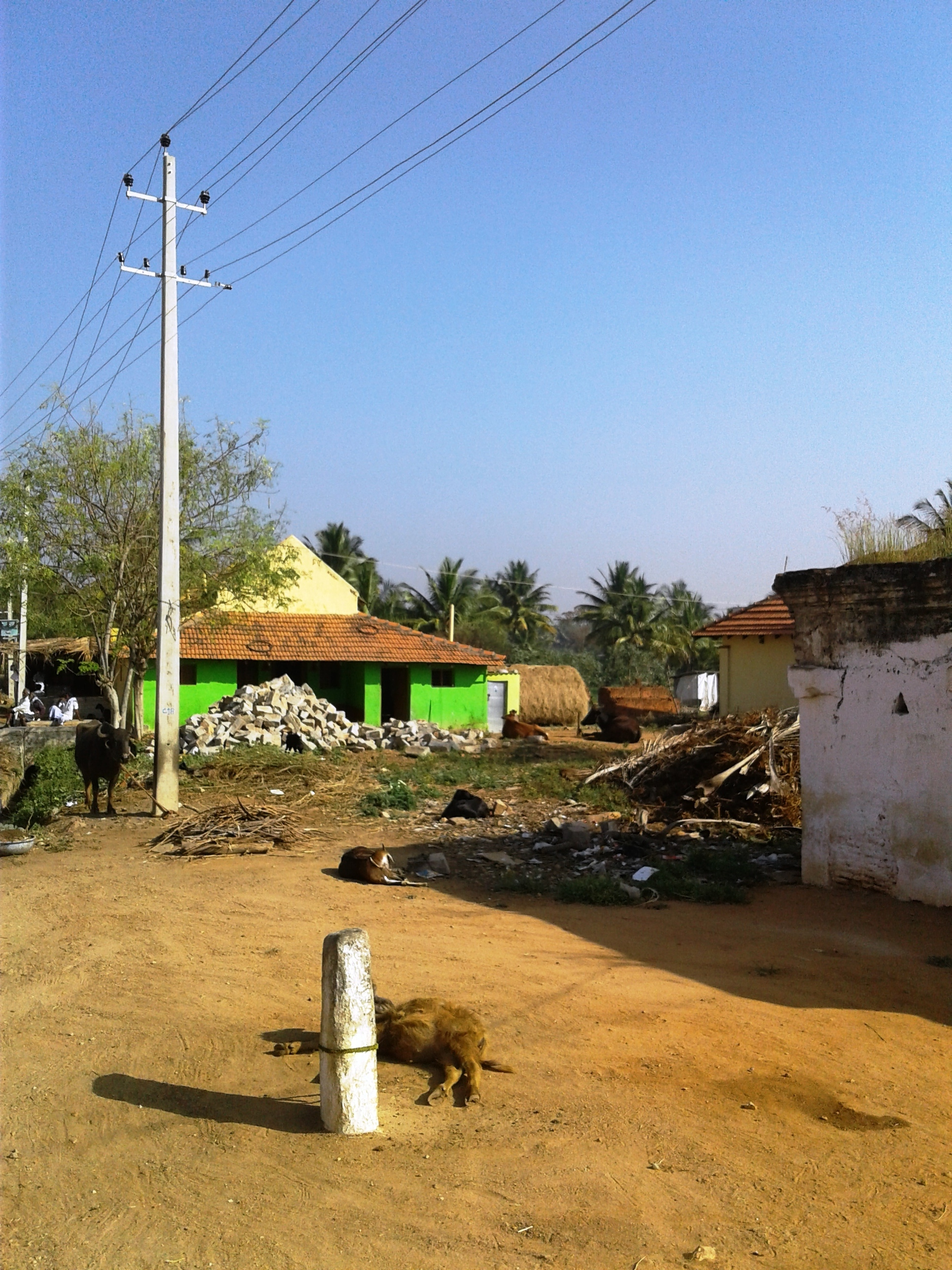
Chottahalli, Yeliyur

Yeliyur is a village in Mandya district, Karnataka state, India. It lies 10 kilometres (6.2 mi) from the city of Mandya.

== Transportation ==
Yeliyur has a passenger railway station on the Mysore–Bangalore railway line.

== Economy ==
The economy is chiefly agrarian. Cultivation is dependent upon irrigation from canals fed by the Cauvery river. Syndicate bank has opened a branch here.

There is a post office and the postal code is 571402.

== See also ==
- Jakkanahalli
- Chinya
- Naganahalli
- Pandavapura
- Byadarahalli
