= Mysuru Junction–MGR Chennai Central Vande Bharat Express =

Mini Vande Bharat Express train route in India

Mysuru - MGR Chennai Central Vande Bharat Express
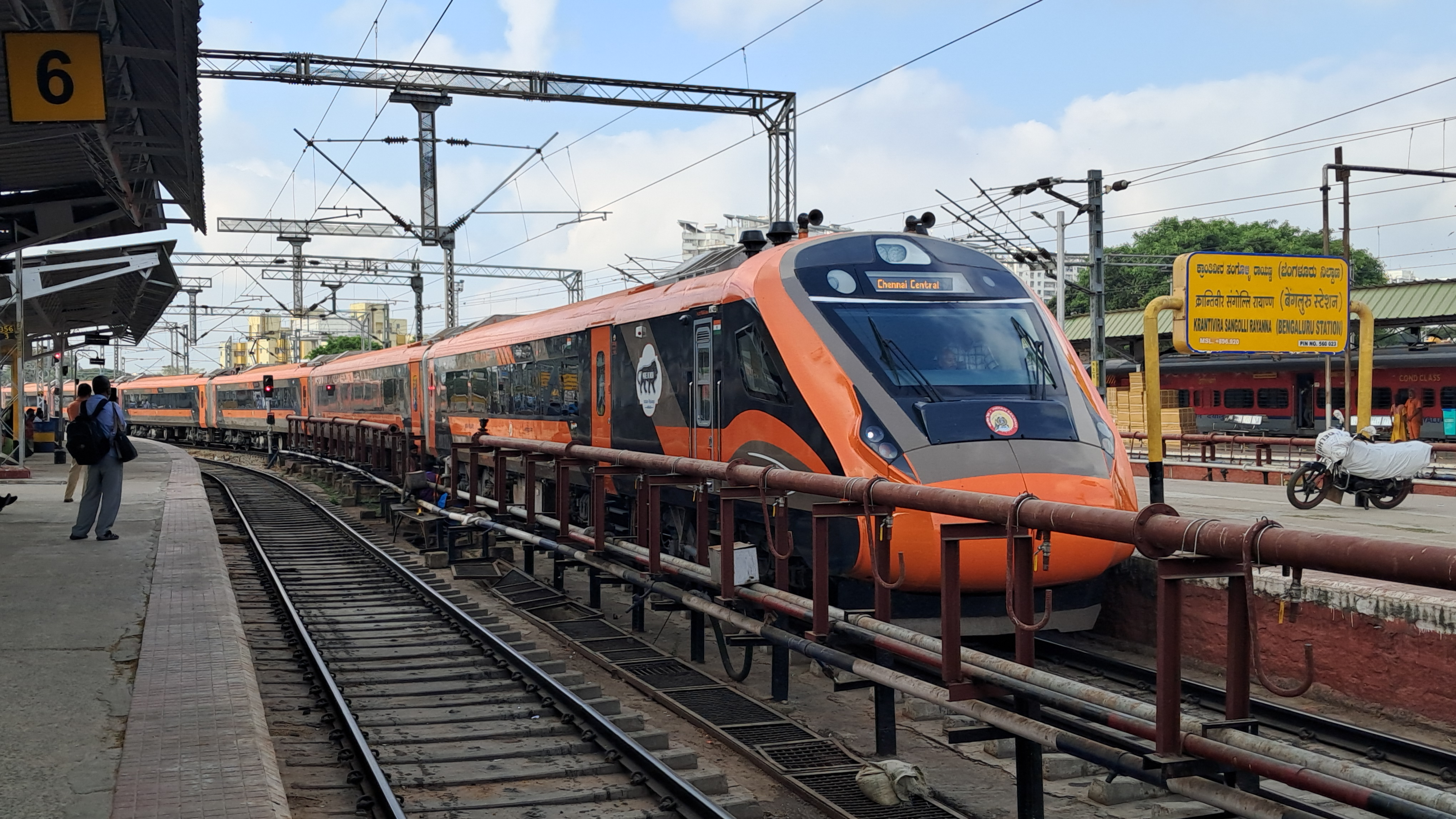
- This 46th Mini Vande Bharat Express train arriving at KSR Bengaluru

Overview
- Service type: Vande Bharat Express
- Locale: Karnataka and Tamil Nadu
- First service: 12 March 2024 (Inaugural); 14 March 2024; 2 years ago (Commercial)
- Current operator: South Western Railways (SWR)

Route
- Termini: Mysuru Junction (MYS); MGR Chennai Central (MAS)
- Stops: 4
- Distance travelled: 497 km (309 mi)
- Average journey time: 06 hrs 25 mins
- Service frequency: Six days a week (Note: Except Thursdays)
- Train number: 20663 / 20664
- Lines used: Mysuru–KSR Bengaluru line; KSR Bengaluru - MGR Chennai Central line

On-board services
- Classes: AC Chair Car, AC Executive Chair Car
- Seating arrangements: Airline style; Rotatable seats
- Sleeping arrangements: No
- Catering facilities: On board Catering
- Observation facilities: Large windows in all coaches
- Entertainment facilities: On-board WiFi; Infotainment System; Electric outlets; Reading light; Seat Pockets; Bottle Holder; Tray Table
- Baggage facilities: Overhead racks
- Other facilities: Kavach

Technical
- Rolling stock: Mini Vande Bharat 2.0
- Track gauge: Indian gauge 1,676 mm (5 ft 6 in) broad gauge
- Electrification: 25 kV 50 Hz AC Overhead line
- Operating speed: 77 km/h (48 mph) (Avg.)
- Average length: 192 metres (630 ft) (08 coaches)
- Track owner: Indian Railways
- Rake maintenance: Mysuru Junction (MYS)

The 20663/20664 Mysuru - MGR Chennai Central Vande Bharat Express is India's 46th Vande Bharat Express train, connecting the cultural capital city of Mysuru in Karnataka with the coastal capital city Chennai in Tamil Nadu. This express train was inaugurated by Prime Minister Narendra Modi via video conferencing from Ahmedabad on March 12, 2024.

== Overview ==
This train is operating by Indian Railways, connecting Mysuru Junction and MGR Chennai Central. It is currently operated with train numbers 20663/20664 on 6 days a week basis.

As per latest updates from South Western Railways, this express train W.E.F. 30 July 2024 will operate on Wednesdays instead of Thursdays due to the maintenance schedule changes.

== Rakes ==
It is the forty-fourth 2nd Generation and twenty-ninth Mini Vande Bharat 2.0 Express train which was designed and manufactured by the Integral Coach Factory at Perambur, Chennai under the Make in India Initiative.

== Service ==
The 20663/20664 Mysuru Jn - MGR Chennai Ctrl Vande Bharat Express operates six days a week except Thursdays, covering a distance of 497 km (309 mi) in a travel time of 6 hours with an average speed of 76 km/h (47 mph). The service has 4 intermediate stops. The Maximum Permissible Speed is 130 km/h (81 mph).

== Gallery ==
A couple of pictures on this particular express train shown below:-

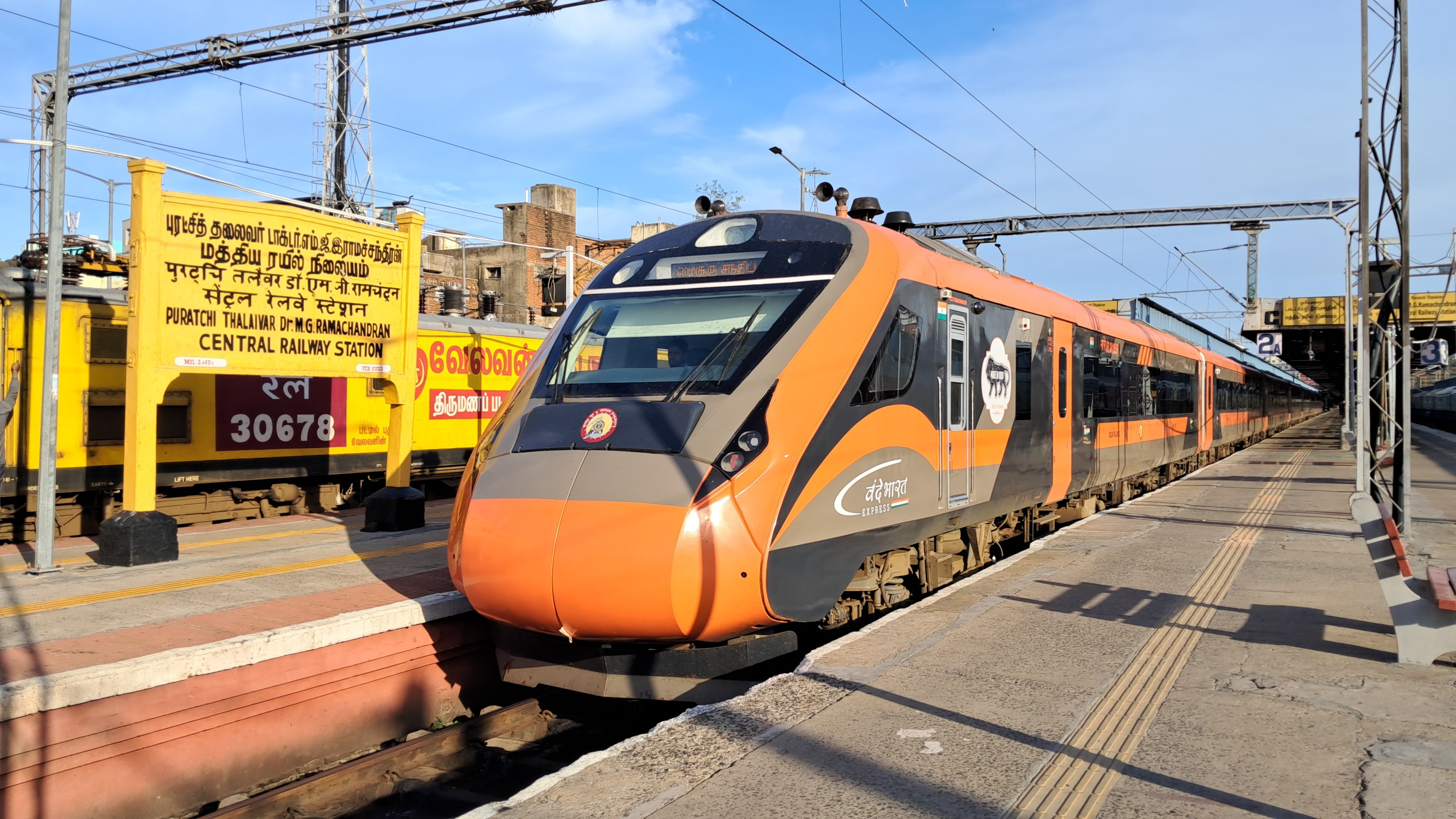
This Mini Vande Bharat Express train departing from MGR Chennai Central

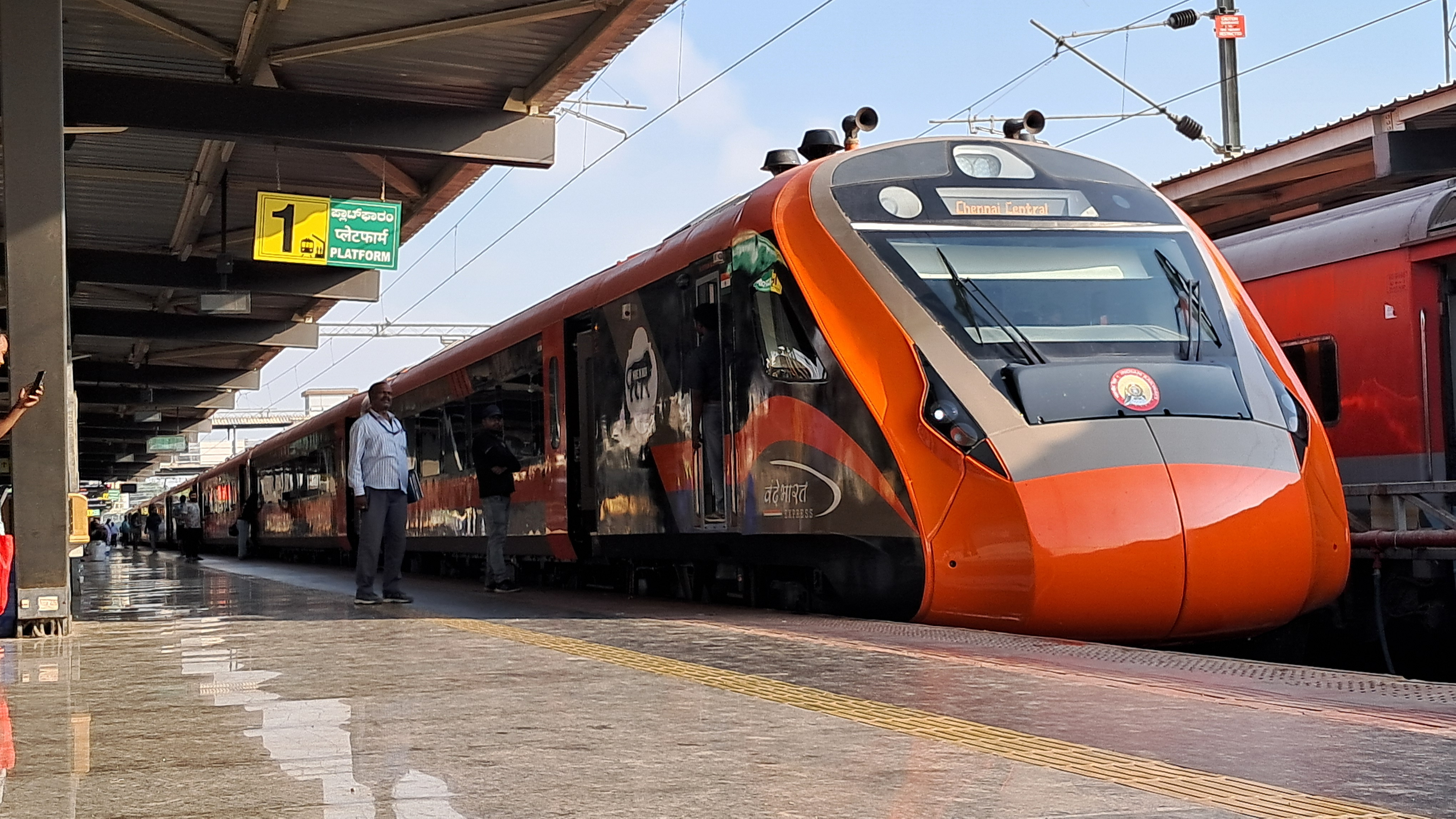
This Mini Vande Bharat Express formerly on standby at SMVT Bengaluru

== See also ==
- MGR Chennai Central–Mysuru Vande Bharat Express
- Vande Bharat Express
- Tejas Express
- Gatimaan Express
- Mysore Junction railway station
- Chennai Central railway station
