= Byadarahalli =

Village in Karnataka, India

Coordinates: 12.501924°N 76.751958°E

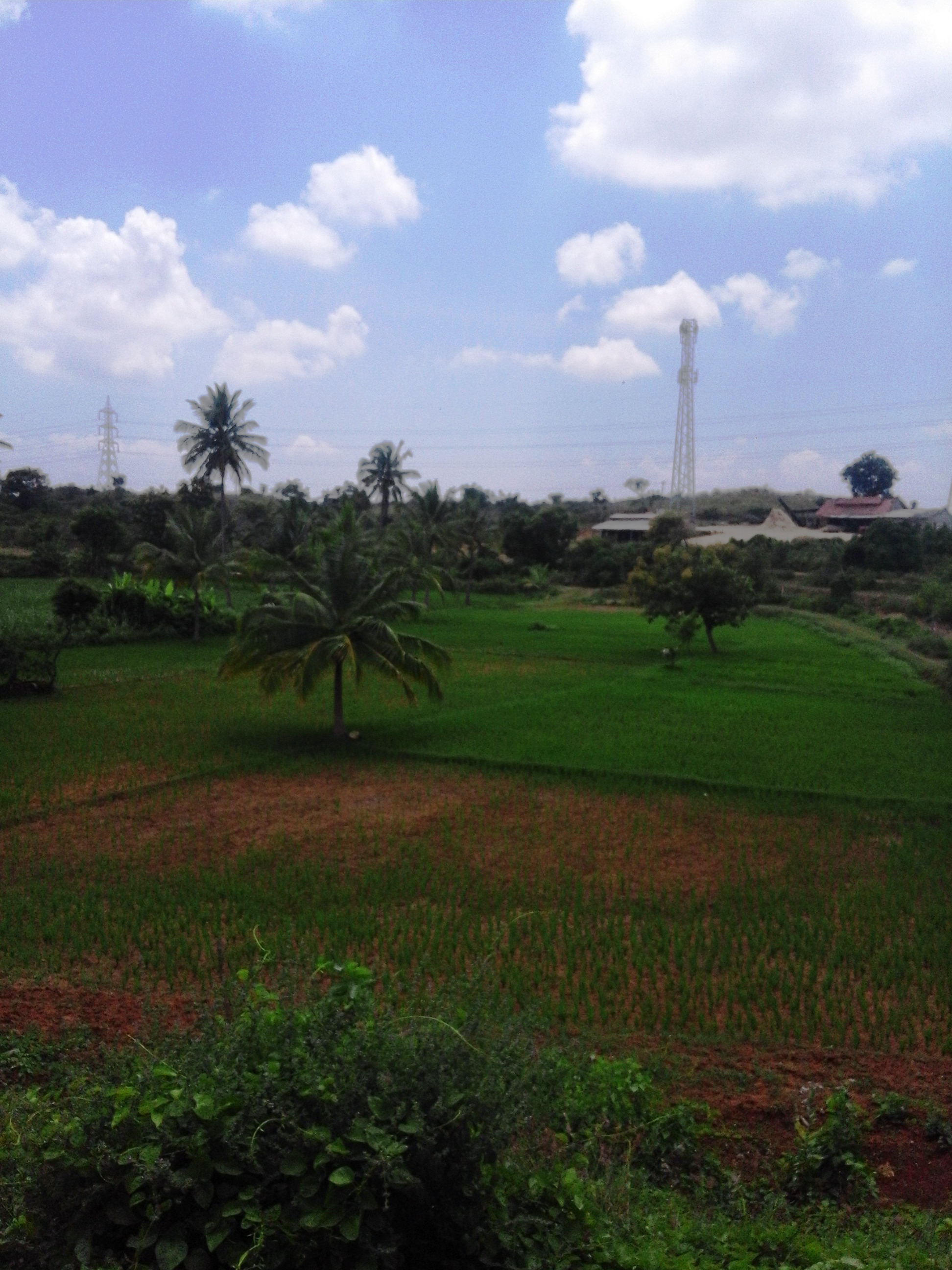
View from the Byadarahalli Railway Station

Byadarahalli is a village in the Mandya district of Karnataka, India.

== Location ==
Byadarahalli is located between Mysore and Bangalore.

== Access ==
Byadarahalli has a railway station where only slow trains stop. Buses are available from Mandya.

== Post office ==
There is a post office in the village with the pincode being 571434.

== See also ==
- Mandya
- Naganahalli
- Pandavapura
- Shrirangapattana
- Yeliyur
