= Chinya =

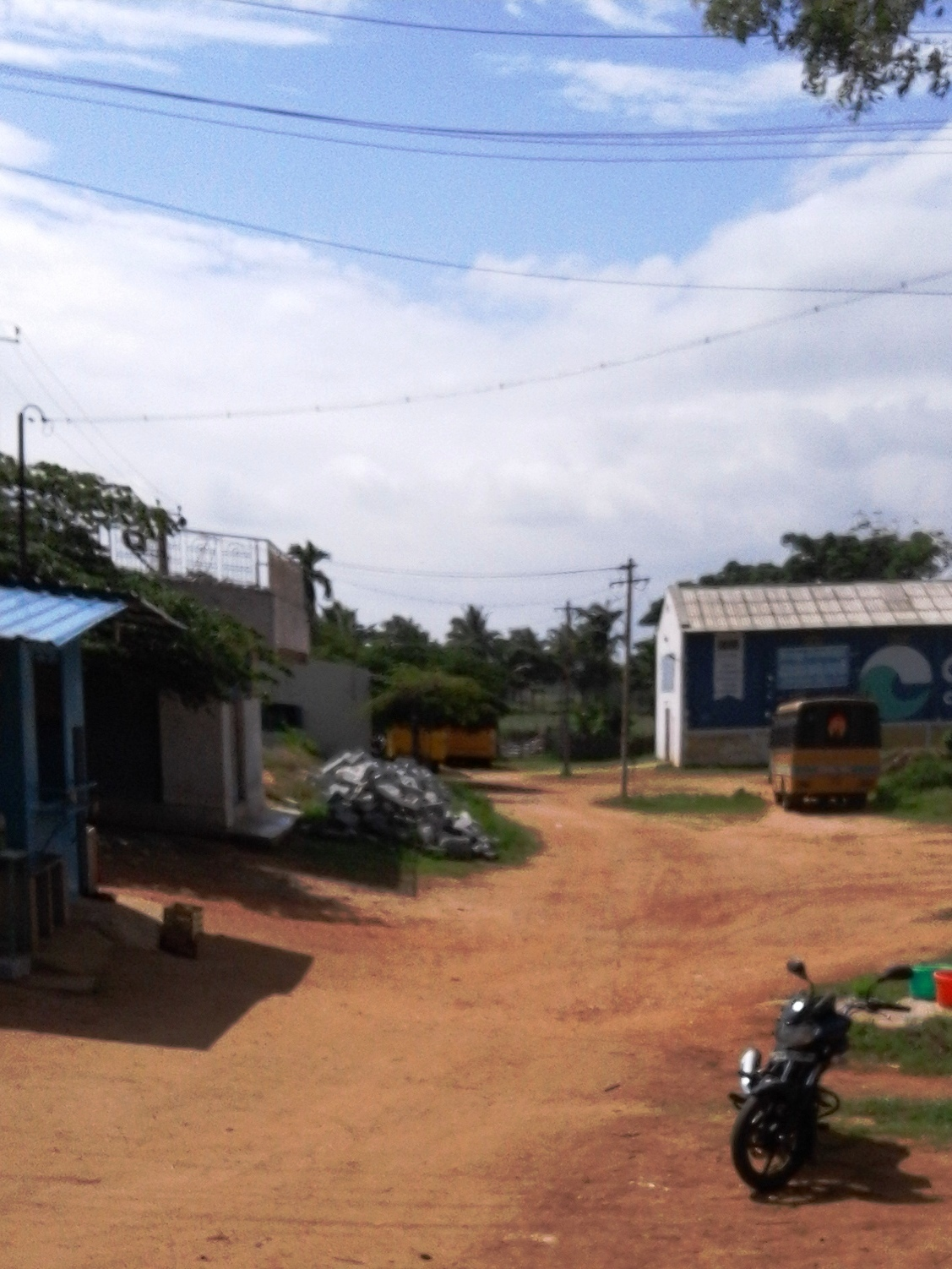
- Chinya Village
- Interactive map of Chinya
- Coordinates: 12.71275°N 76.70305°E
- Country: India
- State: Karnataka
- District: Mandya
- Time zone: UTC+5:30 (IST)
- PIN: 571434
- Telephone code: 08236
- Vehicle registration: KA

Chinya is a small village in Mandya district of Karnataka state, India.

== Location ==
Chinya is located between Nagamangala and Pandavapura. It is very near to Melukote town.

== Post Office ==
There is a post office in Chinya and the pin code is 571434.

== Economy ==
Chinya is a village of agrarian economy. Vijaya Bank has a branch here.
