= Mysore–Bangalore line =

Railway line in India

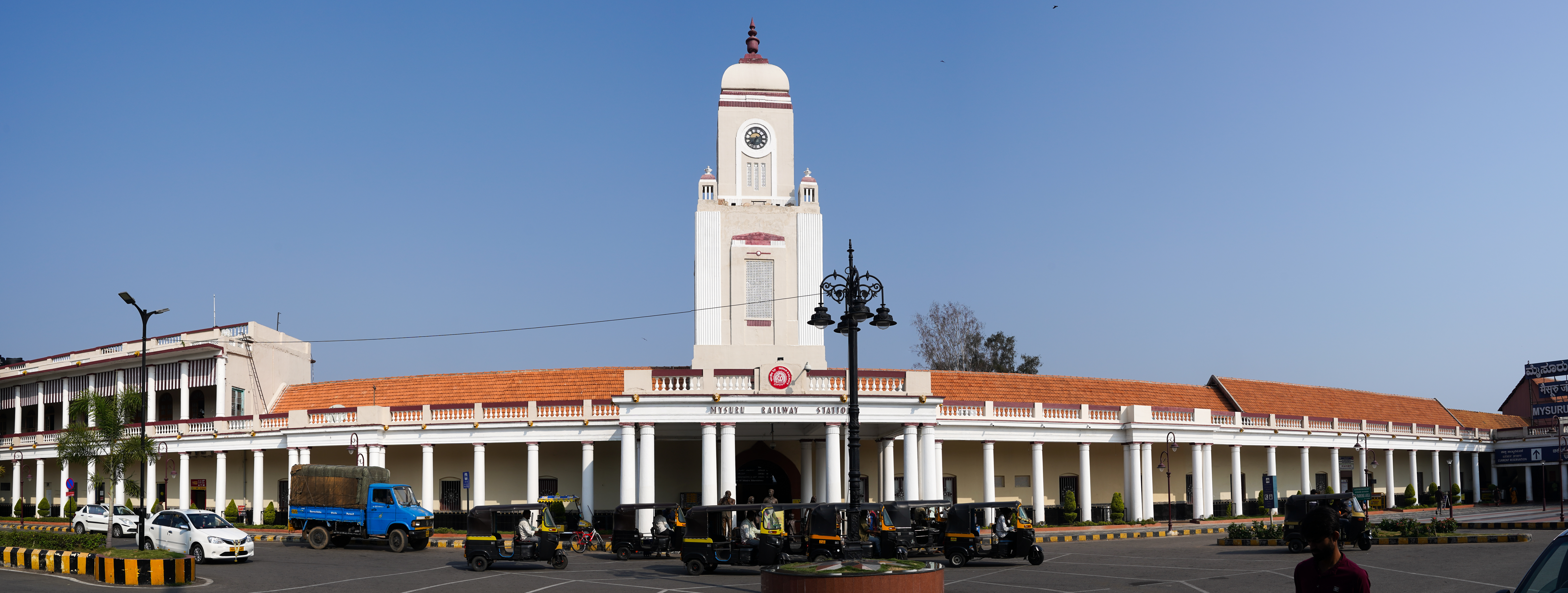
- Mysore Junction

Overview
- Status: Operational
- Owner: Indian Railways
- Locale: Karnataka
- Termini: Mysore Junction (MYS); Bangalore City (SBC)
- Stations: 24
- Website: www.swr.indianrailways.gov.in

Service
- Services: 1
- Route number: 74
- Operator: South Western Railway zone
- Depot: Krishnarajapuram
- Rolling stock: WDM-2; WDM-3A; WDP-4D; WDP-4; WDG-3A; WDG-4; WDM-3D; WAP-7; WAP-4; WAG-7; WAP-1

History
- Opened: 25 February 1882; 144 years ago

Technical
- Line length: 138.25 kilometres (85.90 mi)
- Number of tracks: 2
- Track gauge: 1,676 mm (5 ft 6 in)
- Old gauge: 1,000 mm (3 ft 3 3/8 in)
- Loading gauge: 4,725 mm × 3,660 mm (15 ft 6.0 in × 12 ft 0.1 in) (BG)
- Electrification: Completed in December 2017
- Operating speed: 110 km/h (68 mph)

Mysore–Bangalore line (officially Mysuru–Bengaluru line) is a fully electrified double line from Mysore Junction to Bangalore City.

== Background ==
The line extends from Mysore Junction to Bangalore City falling mostly under Bangalore railway division and a few stretches under Mysore railway division within the limits of South Western Railway zone at Bangalore City.

== Construction ==
Since the rail network in British India was entirely private affairs. The erstwhile Kingdom of Mysore established Mysore State Railway for improving rail connectivity, right after the commissioning of Madras Royapuram–Bangalore City railway line in 1879. Though managing Mysore State Railway was an expensive affair, Chamarajendra Wadiyar X decided to lay a new rail from Bangalore to Mysore in 1870, and shelved the project soon. Again he dusted the project and initiated the construction in 1877–1878. The 56 kilometres (35 mi) stretch between Bangalore–Channapatna was completed on 1 February 1881, the 37 kilometres (23 mi) Channapatna–Mandya stretch on 20 March 1881 and the final 45 kilometres (28 mi) Mandya–Mysore stretch was completed and the entire stretch thrown open to traffic on 25 February 1882. The line currently has a maximum operating speed of 100 km/h (62 mph). Talks are going on to increase the speed from 100 km/h (62 mph) to 130 km/h (81 mph) in order to facilitate semi high speed trains like Vande Bharat express which will reduce the time taken between the 2 cities to less than 100 minutes, but with high amount of gradients and high degree curve the construction of new railway line is a possibility.

The project to convert the Bangalore–Mysore metre gauge to broad gauge is approved in 1979–80.

== Development ==
Sanctioned in 2009–2010, the railways took up the state's demand for doubling as well electrification at an estimated cost of ₹505 crore (US$52 million) which was later revised to ₹526.31 crore (US$55 million) and finally escalated to ₹874.75 crore (US$91 million). Land acquisition of about 160 acres (65 ha), especially 25 acres (10 ha) near Mandya alone have been done as part of double line and improving stations between Ramanagaram and Mysore Junction.

The electrification of the line had been completed and was inaugurated by Prime Minister Narendra Modi on 20 February 2018.
