= Narasimha =

Man-lion and the fourth avatar of Hindu god Vishnu

- Protection, Destruction, Yoga and Kala (Time); The Destruction of Evil and Fear
- Member of Dashavatara
- A sculpture of Yoga-Narsimha, South India, late Chola period
- Devanagari: नरसिंह
- Sanskrit transliteration: Narasimha
- Affiliation: Vaishnavism; Avatar of Vishnu; Dashavatara; Lakshmi Narasimha; Nava Narasimha
- Abode: Vaikuntha
- Mantra: ugraṃ vīraṃ mahāviṣṇuṃ jvalantaṃ sarvatomukham nṛsiṃhaṃ bhīṣaṇaṃ bhadraṃ mṛtyumṛtyuṃ namāmyaham
- Weapon: Claws, Sudarshana Chakra (discus), Kaumodaki (mace)
- Festivals: Narasimha Jayanti, Holi
- Consort: Lakshmi

Dashavatara Sequence
- Predecessor: Varaha
- Successor: Vamana

Narasimha (Sanskrit: नरसिंह, lit. 'man-lion', IAST: Narasiṃha, or Sanskrit: नृसिंह, IAST: Nṛsiṃha), is a deity in Hinduism, revered as the fourth of the ten principal avatars (Dashavatara) of the god Vishnu. Depicted with a human torso and a lion's head and claws, Narasimha is venerated as a fierce protector who destroys evil and safeguards his devotees. He is most widely known for protecting his devotee Prahlada and for slaying the tyrannical demon king Hiranyakashipu.

According to Hindu texts, Hiranyakashipu, the elder brother of Hiranyaksha—who was killed earlier by Vishnu's Varaha avatar—received a boon from the creator god Brahma that made him nearly invulnerable. The conditions of the boon prevented his death by man or beast, indoors or outdoors, during day or night, on earth or in the sky, and not by any weapon. Empowered by this, Hiranyakashipu persecuted Vishnu’s devotees, including his own son Prahlada. To circumvent the boon, Vishnu incarnated as Narasimha—neither man nor animal—and killed Hiranyakashipu at twilight, on a palace threshold, placing him on his lap and tearing him apart with his claws.

Narasimha holds a central place in the Vishnu-centric Vaishnava theology, iconography, and devotional traditions, particularly within the Vaikhanasa, Sri Vaishnava and Sadh Vaishnava sects. He is portrayed in a range of forms, from fierce (ugra) to serene (saumya), and in certain Vaishnava interpretations, he is also worshipped as Yoga-Narasimha, the god of yoga, and as the god of destruction, who destroys the entire universe through Pralaya. Early representations have been found at archaeological sites in Uttar Pradesh and Andhra Pradesh, such as Mathura, and are dated between the 2nd and 4th centuries CE. Important pilgrimage sites dedicated to Narasimha include Ahobilam in Andhra Pradesh, where Nava Narasimha–nine forms of the deity–are venerated.

He is honored in various temples, scriptures, performance traditions, and festivals, including Holi. The annual festival Narasimha Jayanti, observed on the 14th day of the Hindu month of Vaishakha (April–May), commemorates the deity’s appearance to protect Prahlada and defeat Hiranyakashipu.

== Etymology ==
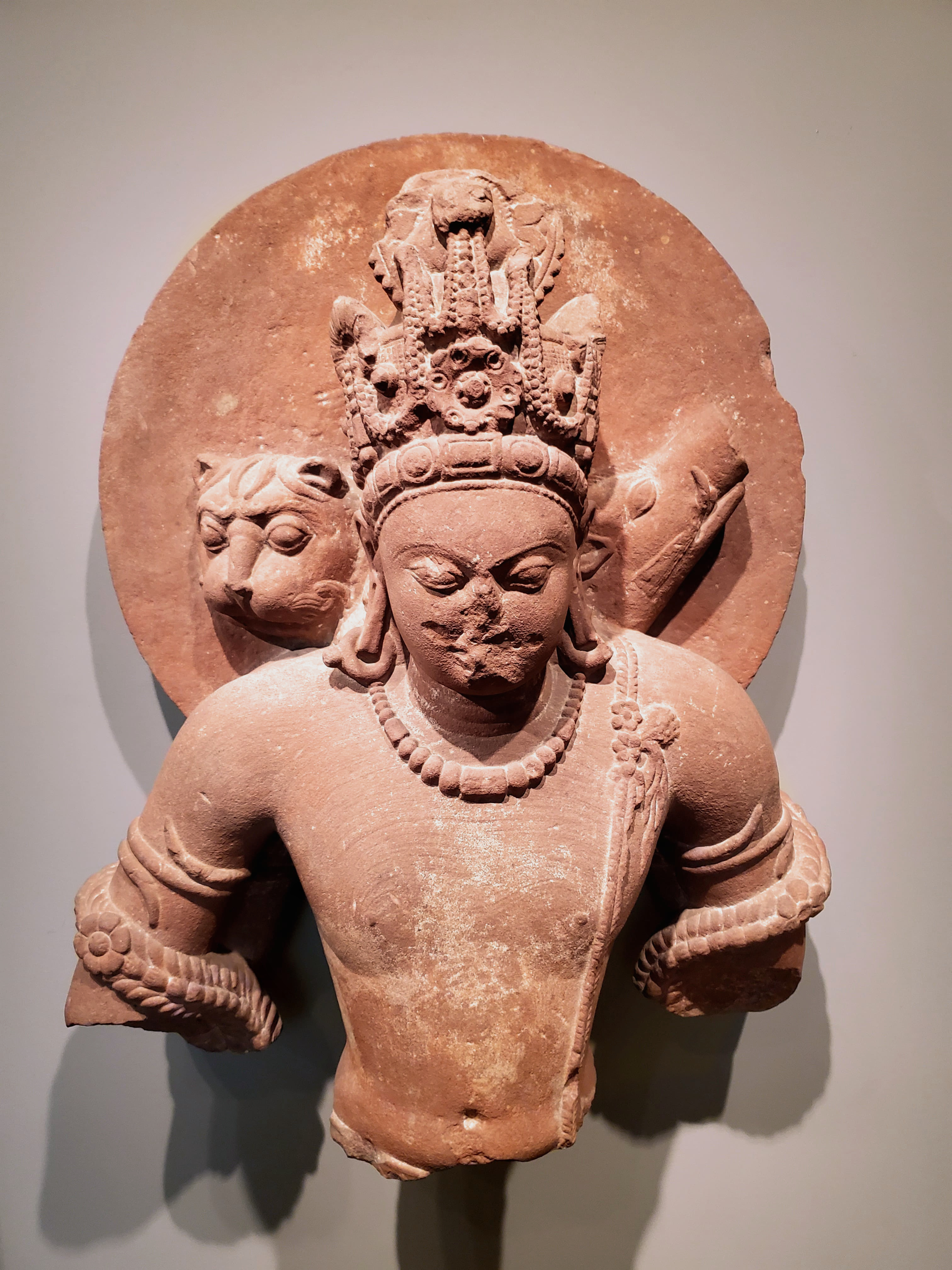
Vishnu and his avatars (Vaikuntha Chaturmurti): Depicting Vishnu as Krishna and Rama, Narasimha (lion), and Varaha (boar). Art of Mathura, mid-5th century CE. Boston Museum.

In Sanskrit, the word Narasimha consists of two words "nara" which means man, and "simha" which means lion, referring to the man-lion avatara of Vishnu.

His other names are Agnilochana (अग्निलोचन) – the one who has fiery eyes, Bhairavadambara (भैरवडम्बर) – the one who causes terror by roaring, Karala (कराल) – the one who has a wide mouth and projecting teeth, Hiranyakashipumardana (हिरण्यकषिपुमर्दान) – the one who killed Hiranyakashipu, Nakhastra (नखास्त्र) – the one for whom nails are his weapons, Simhavadana (सिंहवदन) – the one who has a lion face and Simha (सिंह) – the one who is a lion.

== Texts ==
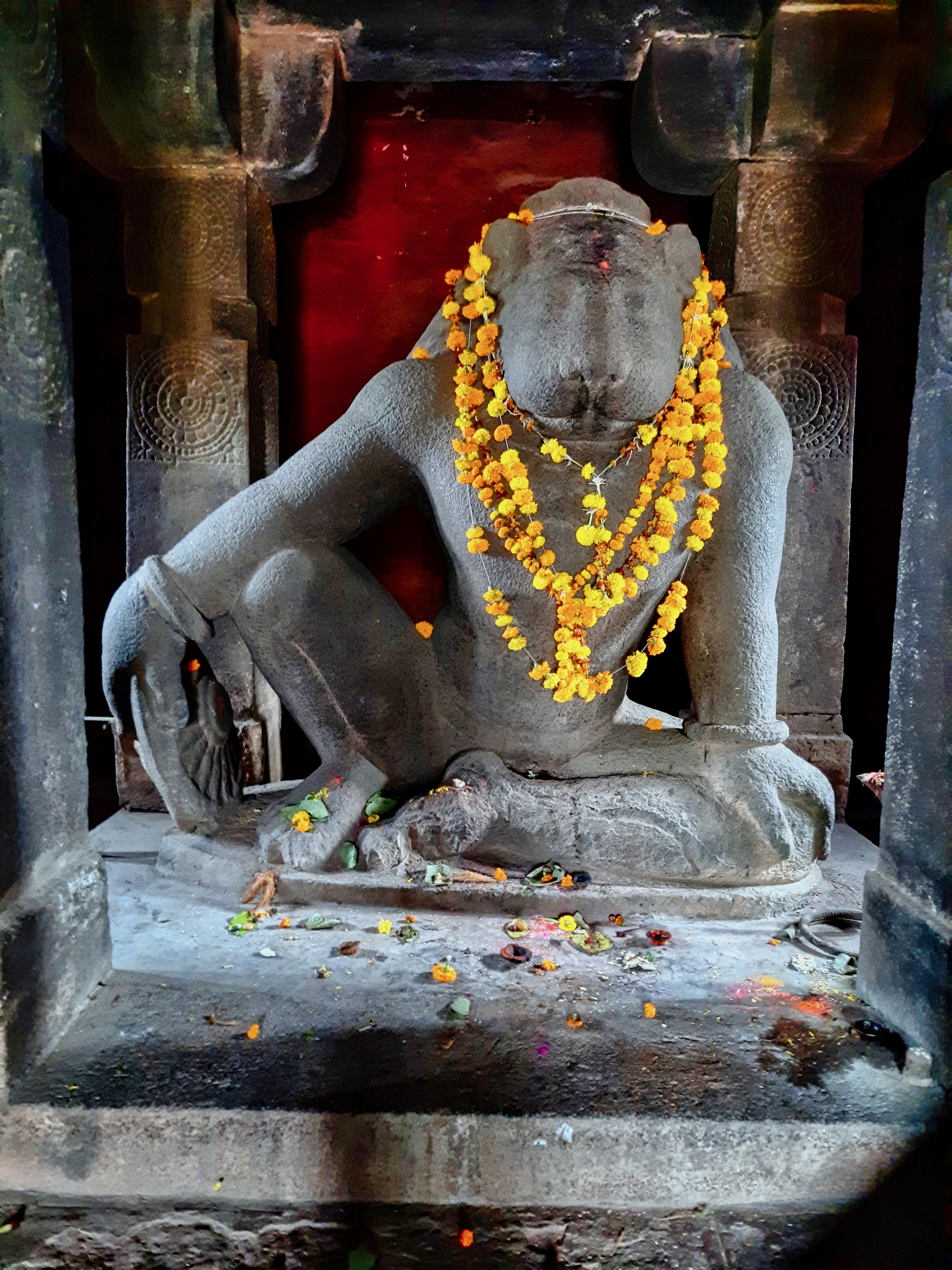
Narasimha, 5th century CE, Ramtek Kevala Narasimha temple.

=== Vedas ===
Verse 1.154.2 of the Rigveda (15th century BCE to the 10th century BCE) describes Vishnu as a fearful prowling beast. This verse depicts Vishnu as a powerful and terrifying Mrga, or animal, ruling over the earth with his three steps. Many interpret this as referring to a lion, and thus a precursor to the Narasimha story.

The full story of Indra killing Namuci is found in Shatapatha Brahmana (7th - 6th century BCE) of the Yajurveda in chapter 12.7.3. Other references to Narasimha are found in the Vedic texts Vajaseneyi Samhita 10.34, Pancavimsa Brahmana 12.6.8 and Taittiriya Brahmana 1.7.1.6.

==== The story of Indra killing Namuci ====
Narasimha has the same story as Indra killing Namuci in the Vedas. Indra is the dharmic king of heaven of the devas and devis who commands lightning, thunder, rain and rivers, while Namuci is a deceptive demon asura in competition for power. Namuci offers peace to Indra, which Indra accepts. He demands Indra to promise that he will neither try to kill him with his "palm of the hand nor with the fist", neither in day nor in night, neither with "anything that is dry" nor with "anything that is wet". Indra agrees.

After the deal is done, Namuci carries away all that nourishes the gods and goddesses: the Soma drink, the essence of food and the strength of Indra. The leader of the gods and goddesses finds himself conflicted and feels bound by his promise. Indra then meets Sarasvati (goddess of knowledge) and the Ashvins. They reply they will deal with Namuci, get it all back, if Indra agrees to share his powers, the essence of food and the Soma drink with them. Indra agrees. The gods and the goddess then come up with a creative plan. They pour out a foam of water with a thunderbolt, and Indra takes a thunderbolt in his hand and Indra kills Namuci in evening.

After Namuci is killed, the gods and goddesses get all the powers back, but discover that Namuci had drunk the Soma already. The good was thus now mixed with his evil of his blood, which they did not want to drink. So, they extract the good out from the evil. Thus, good returns to the gods and goddesses, the evil is destroyed.

According to Deborah Soifer, this story is the same as the story of Narasimha, it has the same plot, the same "neither-nor" constraints, and the same creative powers of the good kills and destroys the evil. Further, the Sanskrit words and phrasing such as "neither palm nor fist" and "neither day nor night" in the later Hindu texts is the same as in the Vedic texts. This suggests a link and continuity between the Vedic story of Indra killing Namuci and the story of Narasimha killing Hiranyakashipu in the Puranas. According to Walter Ruben, both stories along with several other stories in ancient and medieval texts reflect the Indian subcontinental tradition of killing and destroying despots and tyrants who abuse power.

=== Puranas ===
Vishnu as Narasimha is mentioned across 17 different Puranas. The Ramayana (7.24), Harivaṃśa (41 & 3.41-47), Vishnu Purana (1.16-20), Bhagavata Purana (Canto 7), Agni Purana (4.2-3), Brahmanda Purana (2.5.3-29), Vayu Purana (67.61-66), Brahma Purana (213.44-79), Vishnudharmottara Purana (1.54), Kurma Purana (1.15.18-72), Matsya Purana (161-163), Padma Purana (5.42), Shiva Purana (2.5.43 & 3.10-12), Linga Purana (1.95-96) and Skanda Purana (2.18.60-130) all mention Vishnu as Narasimha. In all these Puranas and scriptures, Narasimha is described as the god of destruction, who does destruction at the time of Pralaya and described as Kala. Narasimha is also described as having three eyes just like Shiva and does destruction with fire coming from his third eye.

=== Sangam literature ===
The Paripāṭal (Dated between 300 BCE to 300 CE) (Tamil: பரிபாடல், meaning the paripatal-metre anthology) is a classical Tamil poetic work and traditionally the fifth of the Eight Anthologies (Ettutokai) in Sangam literature. Kamil Zvelebil states that the hymns dedicated to Vishnu and Kartikeya have branded the Paripāṭal as a Sanskrit plagiat within the so-called Sangam texts.

Narasimha in Paripadal

O Lord with faultless red eyes! With
burning hatred in his mind and drying up the sandal paste on his chest, Hiranyakashipu, the evil king, fought with his son Prahlada for singing your praises, causing him great shock. Prahlada was not worried about Hiranyakashipu who deserved disrespect. You placed Prahlada’s away because of your love for him. You attacked and caught Hiranyakashipu with your great strength, catching his mountain-like chest as drums of deities roared like thunder. You disemboweled and killed Hiranyakashipu alive with your claws and wore Hiranyakashipu's organs as a garland and threw Hiranyakashipu's organs away, along with broken pieces of a pillar which you blasted and came out, as Narasimha.

Paripadal, poem 4, Verses 10 - 21

=== Other texts ===
Narasimha is also found in and is the focus of Narasimha Tapaniya Upanishad.

== Legends ==
=== Prahlada legend ===
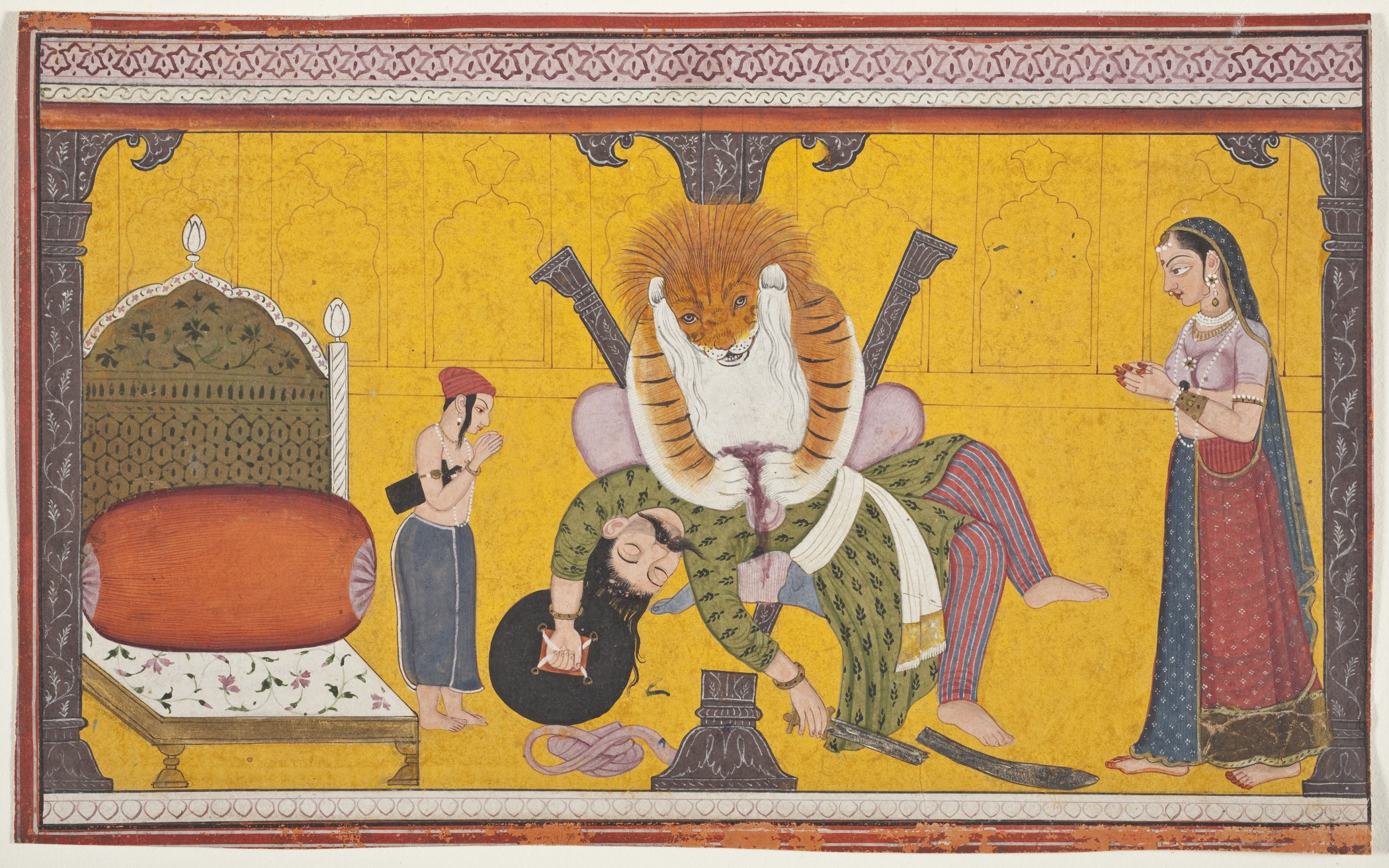
Narasimha disemboweling and killing Hiranyakashipu, manuscript folio from Bhagavata Purana, 1760 CE - 1770 CE.

The Bhagavata Purana says that Vishnu, in his previous avatara as Varaha, killed the evil demon Hiranyaksha. The elder brother of Hiranyaksha, demon king Hiranyakashipu, hated Vishnu and wanted revenge. Hiranyakashipu undertakes prolonged and severe austerities in an effort to achieve immortality and universal sovereignty. Moved by the intensity of these austerities, Brahma grants Hiranyakashipu a series of protective boons providing assurance that he cannot be killed:

- by any creature, human or animal;
- inside or outside;
- during day or night;
- on the ground or in the sky;
- by weapons or by any created being.

Hiranyakashipu, once powerful and invincible with the new boon, began to persecute those who were devotees of Vishnu. Hiranyakashipu had a son, Prahlada, who disagreed and rebelled against his father. Prahlada became a devotee of Vishnu. This angered Hiranyakashipu, who tried to kill the boy but with each attempt, Prahlada was protected by Vishnu's mystical power. When asked, Prahlada refused to acknowledge his father as the supreme lord of the universe and said that Vishnu is omnipresent.

Hiranyakashipu pointed to a nearby pillar and asked if 'his Vishnu' is in it and said to his son Prahlada, "O most unfortunate Prahlada, you have always described a supreme being other than me, a supreme being who is above everything, who is the controller of everyone, and who is all-pervading. But where is He? If He is everywhere, then why is He not present before me in this pillar?" Prahlada then answered, "He was, He is, He will be."

Hiranyakashipu, unable to contain his anger, struck the pillar with his mace. Following a tumultuous sound, Vishnu, in the form of Narasimha, emerged from it and attacked Hiranyakashipu in defense of Prahlada. The form of Narasimha was chosen to avoid the boon granted to Hiranyakashipu by Brahma. According to the boon, Hiranyakashipu could not be killed by a human, deity, or animal. Narasimha, being part-human and part-lion, was none of these. He confronted Hiranyakashipu at twilight (neither day nor night), on the threshold of a courtyard (neither indoors nor outdoors), and placed him on his lap (neither earth nor space). Using his sharp fingernails (neither animate nor inanimate) as weapons, he disemboweled and killed Hiranyakashipu.

Seeing that Narasimha was in rage, Brahma, Shiva and all of the other gods and goddesses sent Prahlada to pacify him. Prahlada prayed to Narasimha, and Ugra Narasimha became the peaceful Soumya Narasimha.

The Kurma Purana describes the preceding battle between the Vishnu and demonic forces in which he destroys the powerful weapons of asuras and asuris and kills the asuras and asuris. According to Soifer, it describes how Prahlada's brothers and sisters, headed by Anuhrada and thousands of other demons, were all led to the valley of death by the man-lion (who was Vishnu as Narasimha) and killed. The same episode occurs in the Matsya Purana, several chapters after Narasimha disemboweled and killed Hiranyakashipu.

== Iconography ==
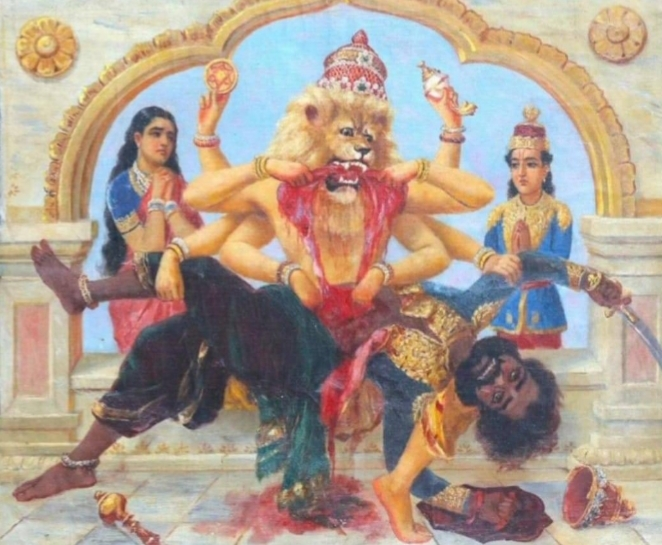
Narasimha slays Hiranyakashipu. Painting by Raja Ravi Varma

Narasimha has a lion face with clawed fingers fused with a human body.He is coming out of a pillar signifying that he is everywhere, in everything, in everyone. Some temples such as at Ahobilam, Andhra Pradesh, the iconography is more extensive, and includes nine other icons of Narasimha:

- Prahladavarada Narasimha: Narasimha blessing Prahlada.
- Yogananda Narasimha: Narasimha as serene and peaceful, teaching yoga.
- Guha Narasimha: Narasimha in a pillar of Hiranyakashipu's palace to disembowel and kill Hiranyakashipu.
- Ugra Narasimha: Narasimha disemboweling and killing Hiranyakashipu.
- Vira Narasimha: Narasimha killing all asuras and asuris.
- Lakshmi Narasimha: Vishnu as Narasimha with Lakshmi as Kanakavalli.
- Jvala Narasimha: Narasimha emitting flames of power.
- Sarvatomukha Narasimha: Narasimha with a powerful face.
- Bhishana Narasimha: A ferocious form of Narasimha.
- Bhadra Narasimha: Blessing form of Narasimha.
- Mrityormrityu Narasimha: Narasimha destroying death of Prahlada by disemboweling and killing Hiranyakashipu.

The earliest known iconography of Narasimha is variously dated to between the 2nd and the 4th-century CE, and these have been found in Uttar Pradesh, Madhya Pradesh and Andhra Pradesh. Most images and temples of Narasimha are found in the peninsular region of India, but important ancient and medieval archeological sites containing Narasimha icons are also found as Vaikuntha Chaturmurti in Kashmir and Khajuraho temples, while single face versions are found in Garhwa and Mathura (Uttar Pradesh) and in Ellora Caves (Maharashtra). Other major temples with notable icons of Narasimha are found in Himachal Pradesh, Madhya Pradesh, Maharashtra, Odisha, Andhra Pradesh, Tamil Nadu and the Vijayanagara Empire ruins in Karnataka. Some of the oldest surviving Hindu temples, such as those found in Tigawa and Eran (Madhya Pradesh), dated to early 5th-century, include Narasimha along with other avatars of Vishnu. The Thuravoor Temple is the most important shrine to Narasimha in Kerala; the form of Narasimha there is known as Vatakanappan.

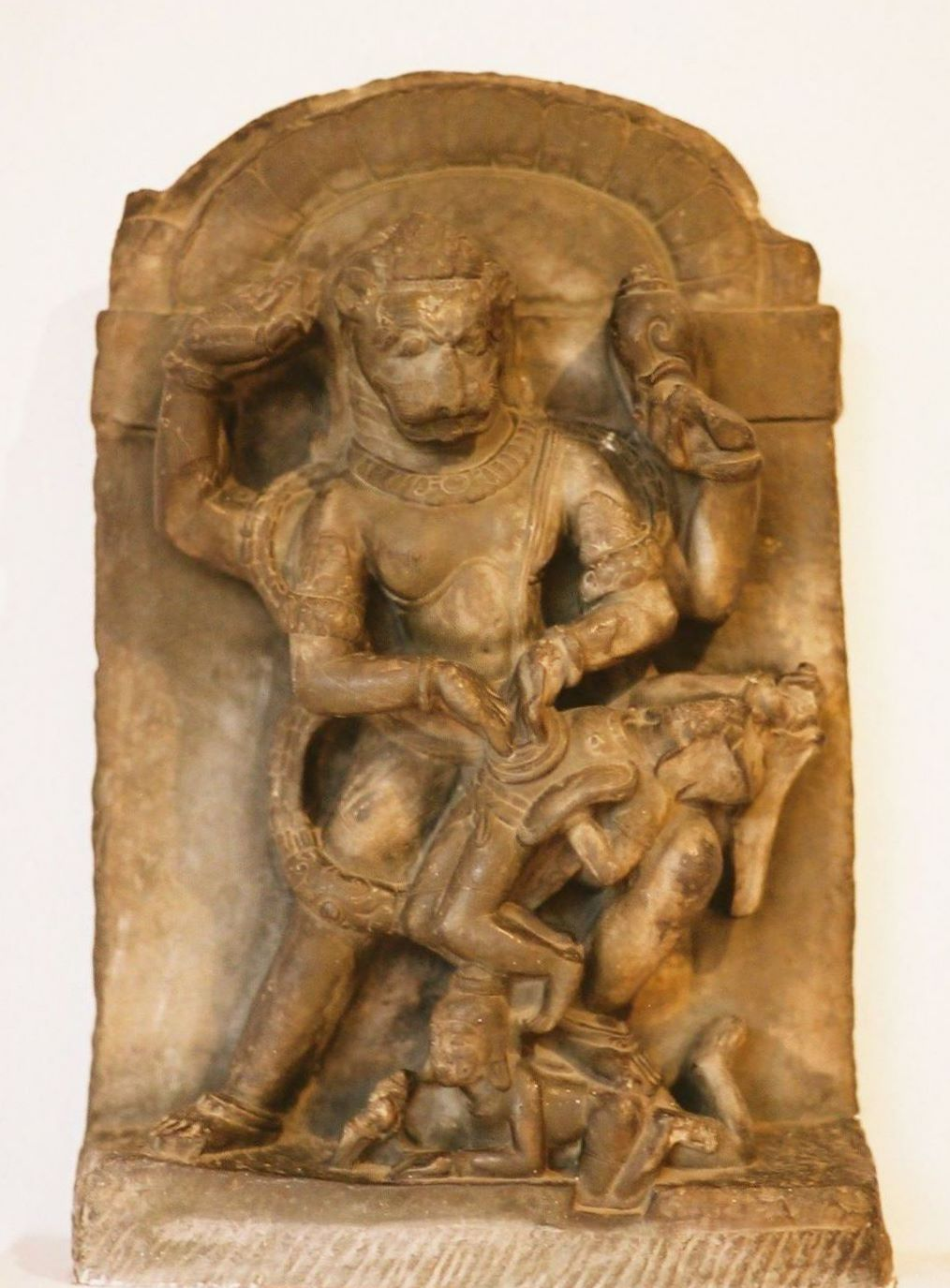
A Statue of Narasimha disemboweling and killing Hiranyakashipu

== Significance ==
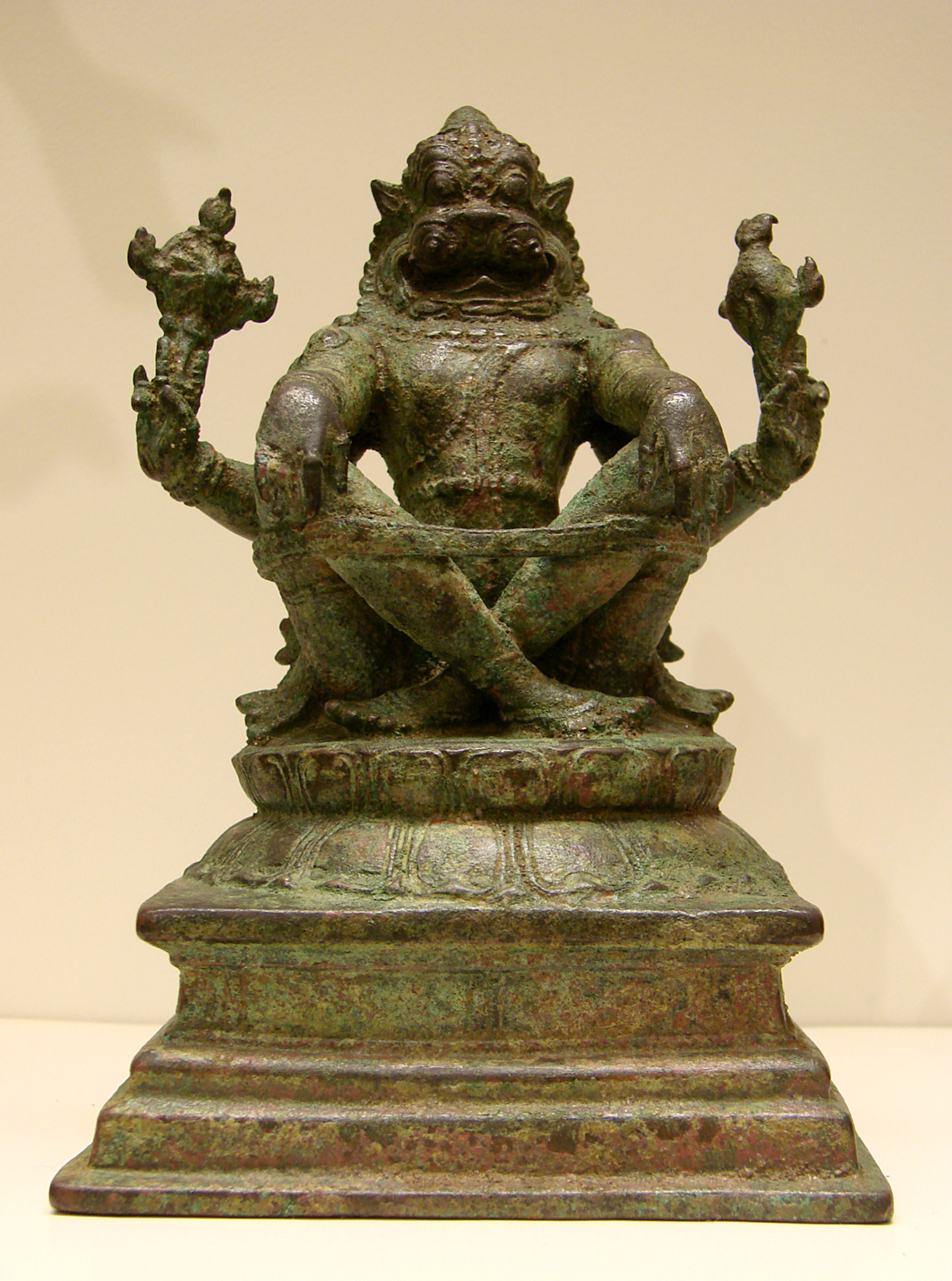
Narasimha, Chola period, 12th - 13th century CE, Tamil Nadu. from Guimet Museum, Paris.

Narasimha is a significant iconic symbol of creative resistance, hope against odds, victory over persecution, and destruction of evil. He is the destructor of not only external evil, but also one's own inner evil of "body, speech, and mind" states Pratapaditya Pal.

In Indian Subcontinental art – sculptures, bronzes and paintings – Vishnu's incarnation as Narasimha is one of the most chosen incarnations in Dashavatara of Vishnu and amongst all Dashavatara of Vishnu, Narasimha is popular.

Narasimha is worshipped across Telangana and Andhra Pradesh States in numerous forms. Although, it is common that each of the temples contain depictions of Narasimha in more than one form, Ahobilam contains nine temples of Narasimha dedicated to the nine forms of Narasimha. Statues of Narasimha disemboweling and killing Hiranyakashipu are common, and this image of Narasimha disemboweling and killing Hiranyakashipu is commonly worshipped in temples, and it is drawn.

There exists a matha (monastery) dedicated to him by the name of Parakala Matha at Mysore in the Sri Vaishnava tradition. There is also Ahobila Matha, another Srivaishnava matha that primarily worships Narasimha, and controls Ahobilam, Tiruvallur, Pulamboothangudi, and Aadanur temples. Kshetras for Narasimha include Ahobilam where Lakshmi Narasimha and Nava Narasimhas are worshiped.

=== Coins, inscriptions and terracotta ===
Narasimha is influential in the 5th-century CE, when various Gupta Empire rulers minted coins with his images or sponsored inscriptions that associated the powers of Narasimha with their own. The rulers thus showed their rule as someone like Narasimha who killed and destroyed evil. Some of the coins of the Kushan era show Narasimha, showing his influence.

Some of the oldest Narasimha terracotta artworks have been dated to about the 2nd century CE, such as those discovered in Kaushambi. A nearly complete, exquisitely carved standing Narasimha statue, wearing a pancha, with personified attributes near him has been found at the Mathura archeological site and is dated to the 6th century CE.

In Andhra Pradesh, one of the earliest depictions dates to the 4th century CE at Kondamotu in Coastal Andhra. A panel dating to third-fourth century CE shows a full theriomorphic squatting lion with two extra human arms behind his shoulders holding a conch and a discus. This lion, flanked by five heroes (Viras), is Narasimha. Standing cult images of Narasimha from the early Gupta period, survive from temples at Tigowa and Eran. These sculptures are two-armed, long maned, frontal, wearing only a lower garment, and with no demon-figure of Hiranyakashipu. Statues of Narasimha disemboweling and killing Hiranyakasipu survive from slightly later Gupta-period temples: one at Madhia and one from a temple-doorway now set into the Kurma Matha at Nachna, both dated to the late fifth or early sixth century CE.

An image of Narasimha supposedly dating to second-third century CE sculpted at Mathura was acquired by the Philadelphia Museum of Art in 1987. It was described by Stella Kramrisch, the former Philadelphia Museum of Art's Indian curator, as "perhaps the earliest image of Narasimha as yet known". This figure depicts a furled brow, fangs, and lolling tongue is same as later images of Narasimha, but the idol's robe, simplicity, and stance set it apart. On Narasimha's chest under his upper garment appears the suggestion of an amulet, which Stella Kramrisch associated with Vishnu's cognizance, the Kaustubha jewel. This upper garment flows over both shoulders; but below Hiranyakasipu, the demon-figure placed horizontally across Narasimha's body, a twisted waist-band suggests a separate garment covering the legs. The Hiranyakashipu's hair streams behind him, catching his head against Narasimha's right knee. He wears a simple single strand of beads. His body is caught and held down. His face is pushed down. His eyes face away below from the face of Vishnu. Hiranyakashipu is caught and pulled down as Narasimha disembowels and kills him. His organs are disemboweled and fall over his right side. In Matsya Purana it is shown Narasimha disemboweled and killed Hiranyakashipu as a plaiter of straw mats shreds his reeds". Based on the Gandhara style of robe worn by the idol, Michael Meiste altered the date of the image to fourth century CE.

An image of Narasimha, dating to the 9th century CE, was found on the northern slope of Mount Ijo, at Prambanan, Indonesia. Images of Trivikrama and Varāha avatāras were also found at Prambanan, Indonesia. Vishnu and His avataras have iconographic differences characteristic of the art of central Java. This includes physiognomy of central Java, an exaggerated volume of garment, and some elaboration of the jewelry. This decorative scheme once formulated became, with very little modification, an accepted norm for sculptures throughout the Central Javanese period (circa 730–930 CE). Despite the iconographic peculiarities, the stylistic antecedents of the Java sculptures can be traced back to Indian carvings as the Chalukya and Pallava images of the 6th–7th centuries CE.

=== Performance arts ===
The story of Narasimha disemboweling and killing Hiranyakashipu is a part of various Indian classical dance repertoire. For example, Kathakali theatre has included the story of Narasimha disemboweling and killing Hiranyakashipu in battle, and performances of Prahlada Charitam with Narasimha has been one of the popular performances in Kerala. Similarly, the Bhagavata Mela dance-drama performance arts of Tamil Nadu traditionally celebrate the annual Narasimha Jayanti festival by performing the story within regional Narasimha temples.

== Notable temples ==
=== India ===
==== Andhra Pradesh ====
- Ahobilam.
- Lakshmi Narasimha Temple, Antarvedi.
- Varaha Lakshmi Narasimha temple, Simhachalam.
- Lakshmi Narasimha Temple, Mangalagiri, Mangalagiri - Tadepalli.
- Vedadri Narasimha Temple, Vedadri.
- Sri Kadiri Lakshmi Narasimha Swamy Temple, Kadiri.
- Sri Penchalakona Lakshmi Narasimha Swami, Penchalakona, Rapur, Andhra Pradesh.

==== Karnataka ====
- Guru Narasimha Temple, Saligrama, Saligrama.
- Narasimha Jharni, Bidar.
- Yoganarasimha Temple, Devarayanadurga, Devarayanadurga.
- Yoga Narasimha Temple, Melukote.
- Lakshmi Narasimha Temple, Bhadravati, Bhadravati, Karnataka.
- Lakshminarasimha Temple, Javagal, Hassan, Karnataka.
- Lakshminarasimha Temple, Haranhalli, Hassan, Karnataka.
- Lakshmi Narasimha Temple, Nuggehalli, Hassan, Karnataka
- Seebi Narasimhaswamy Temple, Seebi, Tumkur, Karnataka.
- Shri Lakshmi Narasimha Swamy Devasthana,savandurga,Magadi,Karnataka.

==== Kerala ====
In Kerala, there is at least one temple dedicated to Narasimha in each of its 14 districts. Notable ones are:

- Sri Lakshmi Narasimha Temple, Thalassery, Thalassery, Kannur district.
- Kozha Sree Narasimhaswami Temple, Kottayam district.
- Sri Narasimhamoorthy Temple, Chelakkara, Thrissur district.

==== Odisha ====
- Narasimha Temple, Bhubaneswar, Bhubaneswar.
- Narasimha Temple, Puri, Puri.

==== Tamil Nadu ====
- Yoga Narasimha Temple, Sholinghur
- Namakkal Narasimha Temple, Namakkal.
- Narasingam Yoga Narasimha Perumal Temple.
- Yoga Narasimha Swamy Temple, Karur

==== Telangana ====
- Hare Krishna Golden Temple.
- Lakshmi Narasimha Temple, Yadadri, Yadadri.
- Lakshmi Narasimha Temple, Dharmapuri.
- Sri Laxmi Narasimha Swamy Temple, Sundilla.
- Sri Hemachala Laxmi Narasimha Swamy, Mallur, Mangapet Mandal, Mulugu district
- Sri Yoga Narashima Swamy Temple, Bhadrachalam

==== West Bengal ====
- Temple of the Vedic Planetarium, Mayapur, Nabadwip.

== Notable Shrine/Ruins ==
=== India ===
==== Karnataka ====
- Burnt shrine restored with largest monolith (6.7 metres (22 ft)) of Yoga-Narasimha, Bhagavati Lakshmi idol removed post arson attempt, Hampi

=== Pakistan ===
Ruins of Prahladpuri Temple

== Notable Matha ==
=== India ===
==== Andhra Pradesh ====
Ahobila Matha

== See also ==
- Narasimha Avatar
- Narasimha Purana
- Narasimha Satakam
- Ramatek Kevala Narasimha temple inscription
- Kanglā shā
- Nongashāba
- Mahavatar Narasimha (2024 Hindi film)
- Apedemak

== Bibliography ==
- Soifer, Deborah A. (1991). The Myths of Narasimha and Vamana: Two Avatars in Cosmological Perspective. SUNY Press. ISBN 9780791407998.
