= Balusupadu =

- Village
- Interactive map of Balusupadu
- Location in Andhra Pradesh, India
- Coordinates: 16.923089°N 80.045807°E
- Country: India
- State: Andhra Pradesh

Population (2011)
  - Total: 2,205

Languages
  - Official: Telugu
- Time zone: UTC+5:30 (IST)
- Postal code: 521 117

Balusupadu is a village in NTR district of the Indian state of Andhra Pradesh. It is located in Jaggayyapeta mandal under Vijayawada revenue division. It is located at 9 km from Jaggayyapeta.

== Demographics ==
As per Population Census 2011, the village has population of 2205 of which 1080 are males and 1125 are females . Average Sex Ratio of Balusupadu village is 1042 which is higher than Andhra Pradesh state average of 993. Population of children with age 0-6 is 261 which makes up 11.84% of total population of village. Child Sex Ratio for the Balusupadu as per census is 1071, higher than Andhra Pradesh average of 939. Literacy rate of Balusupadu village was 60.85% compared to 67.02% of Andhra Pradesh.

== Transport ==
State run APS RTC bus services from Jaggayyapeta to this village.
