= Hare Krishna Golden Temple =

Hindu Temple dedicated to Radha Krishna and Lakshmi Narasimha, Hyderabad

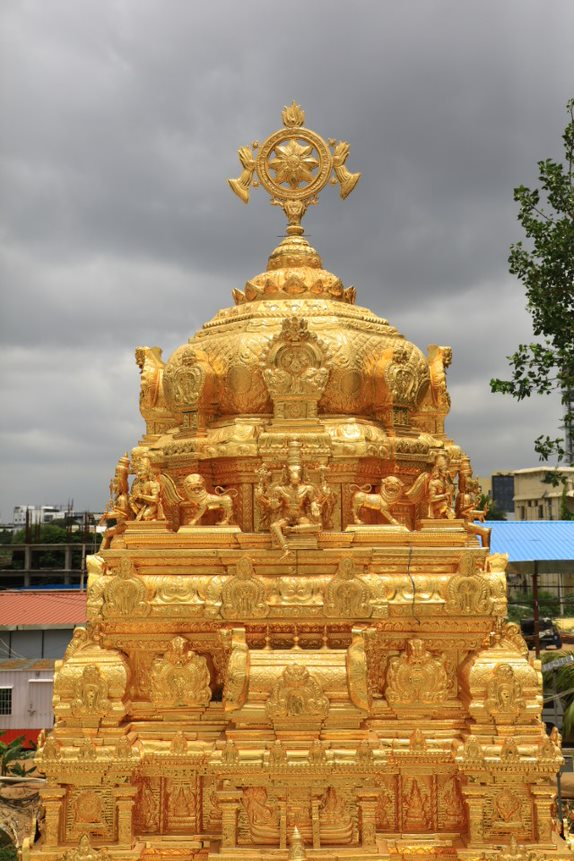

Religion
- Affiliation: Hinduism
- Deity: Sri Sri Radha Govinda, Lakshmi Narasimha

Location
- Location: Banjara Hills
- State: Telangana
- Country: India
- Interactive map of Hare Krishna Golden Temple
- Coordinates: 17.4112085°N 78.4297628°E

Architecture
- Type: Hindu temple architecture
- Completed: 2018

Website
- www.hkmhyderabad.org

Hare Krishna Golden Temple is located at Banjara Hills, Hyderabad, India. It is the first Golden Temple to be constructed in Telangana. It was inaugurated in 2018 by Vice President of India Sri Venkaiah Naidu.

== Hare Krishna Hill ==
Hare Krishna Hill is the hillock on which this temple is situated. HKM Hyderabad is a charitable society with the objective of propagating Krishna consciousness all over the world.

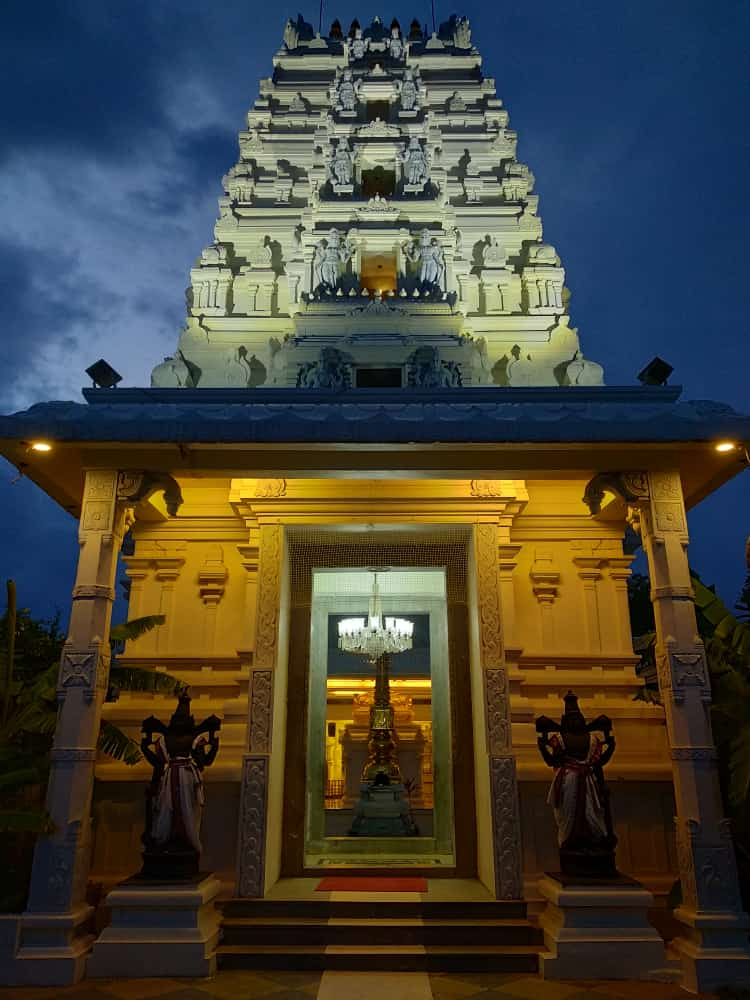

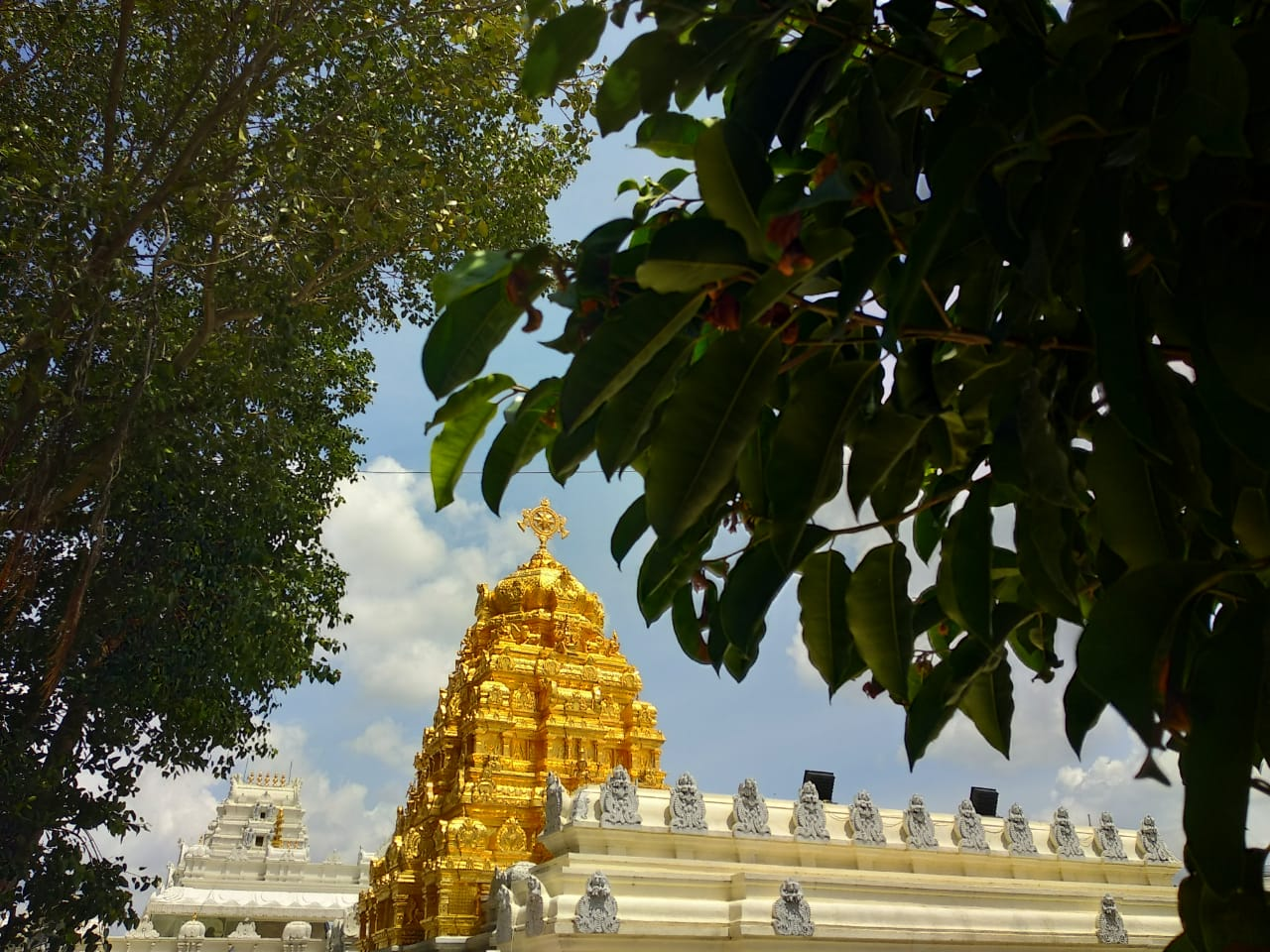

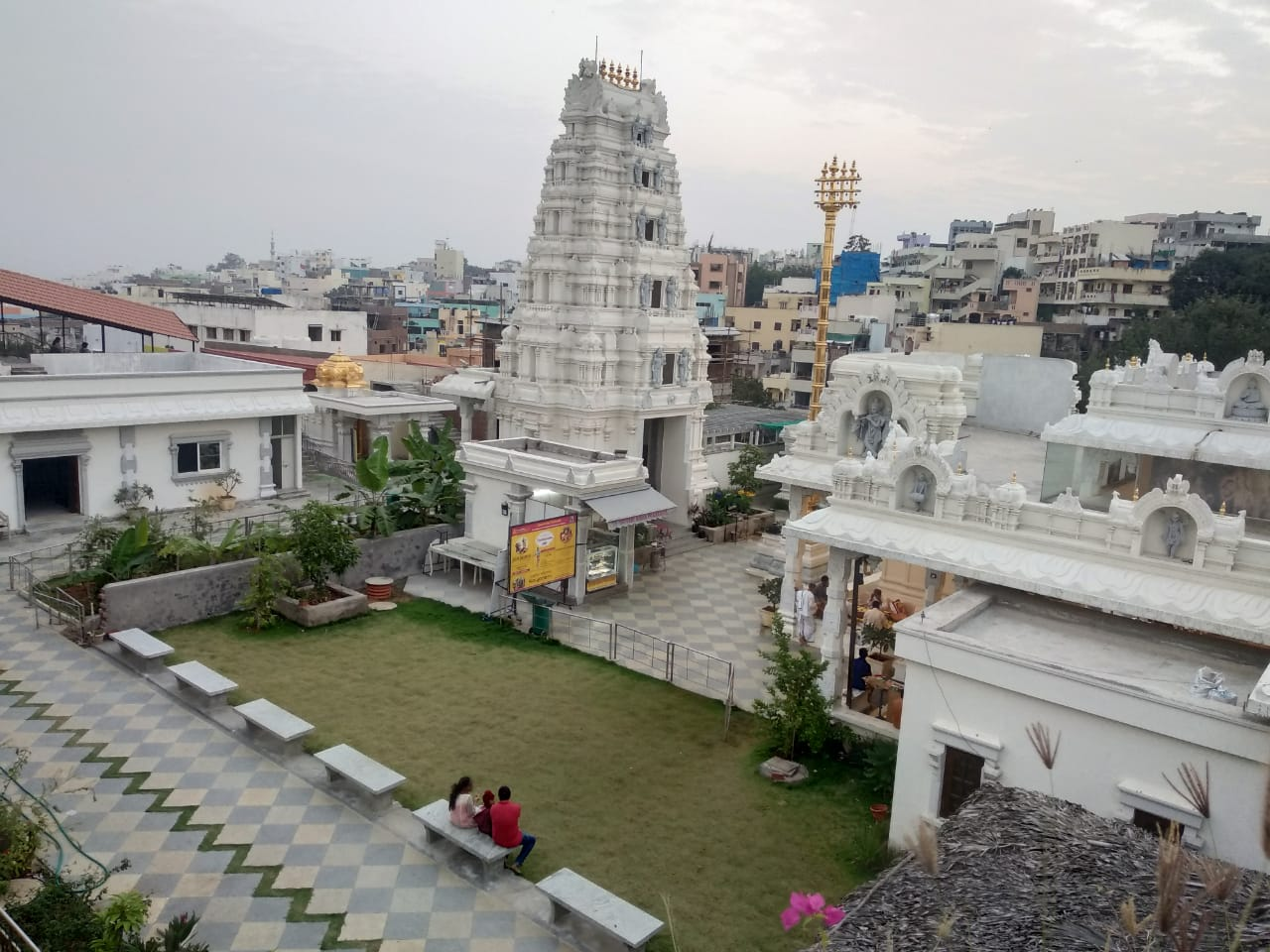

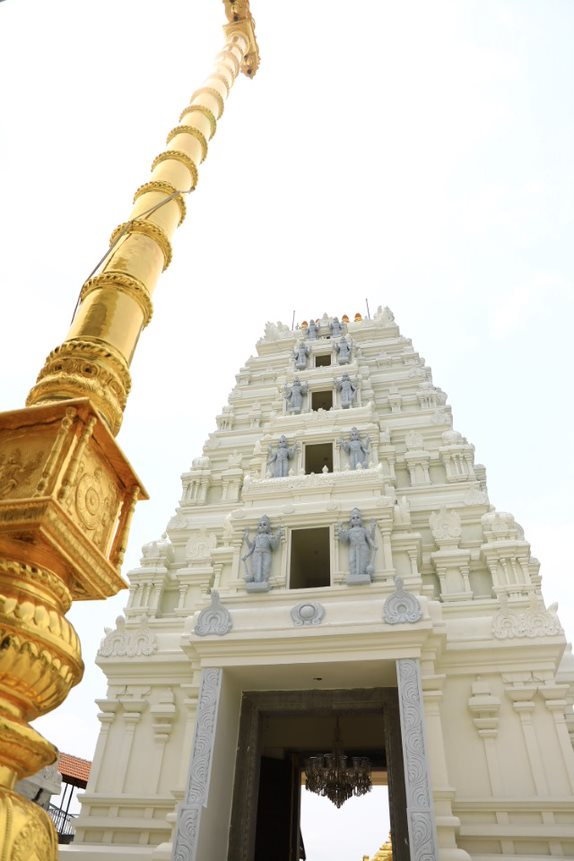

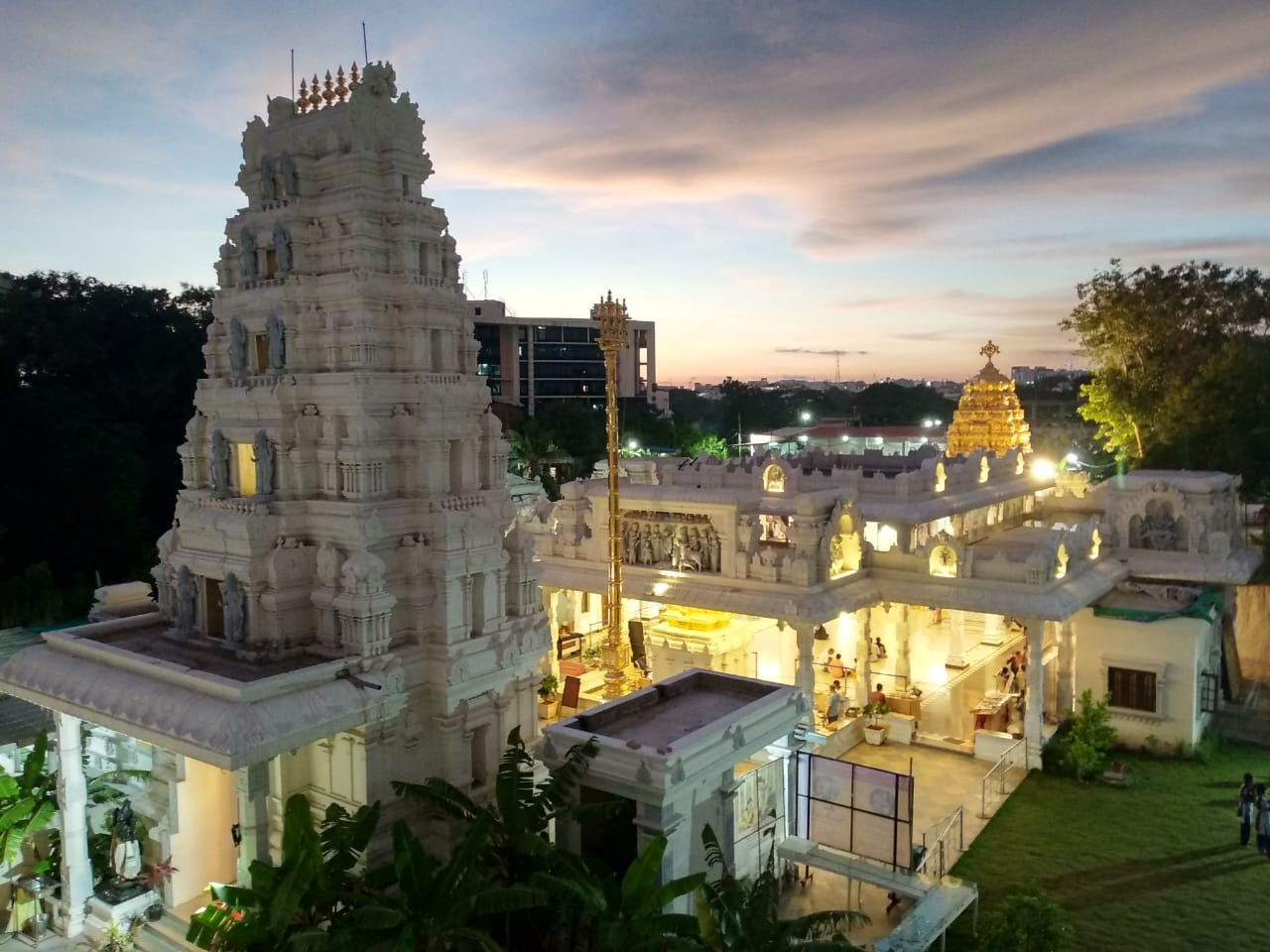
Temple at night

== Features of the temple ==
Swayambhu Sri Lakshmi Narasimha Swamy Kshetram, located in Banjara Hills, is regarded by devotees as one of the oldest temple in Hyderabad, with local tradition attributing its origins to a self-manifestation (swayambhu) of the deity over several centuries ago.

The Hare Krishna Golden Temple is the 1st Golden Temple in Telangana and has a 50 foot Golden Dhwaja Stambh (flagstaff), 4600 square foot Maha Mandapam and five golden stairs Rajagopuram. Within the temple are the murtis (sacred images) of Lord Narasamhadev and his consort, Lakshmi. The Temple has Harinam Japa Mantapa located right after the Dhvaja Stambha. Visitors to the temple can choose to either go through the Harinam Mantapa or directly proceed for darshan of Lord Shri Lakshmi Narasimha. The Japa Mantapa has 108 steps and on every step the devotees stand and chant the Hare Krishna maha-mantra. There is a rare Shaligram shila kept in the Garbhalayam of the presiding deity Swayambhu Sri Lakshmi Narasimha Swamy. This Saligrama Shila was found in Gandaki River (Near Muktinath Temple, Nepal).

== Shrines (altars) ==
Hare Krishna Golden Temple has four shrines:

1. The first shrine is dedicated to Swayambhu Sri Lakshmi Narasimha Swamy.
2. The second shrine is dedicated to Sri Sri Radha-Govinda.
3. The third shrine is dedicated to Lord Shiva as Swayambhu Sri Panchajanyeshwara Swamy.
4. The fourth shrine is dedicated to Lord Hanuman as Sri Japa Anjaneya Swamy.

== Darshan Timings ==
The temple is open to the public from 7.15 am to 12.15 pm during the morning session and from 5.15 pm to 8.15 pm during the evening session. The day begins with a Grand Aarti ceremony called mangala-aarti followed by worship of Tulasi Devi, Sri Narasimha Arati. During every aarti session the devotees sing and dance to the rhythm of Hare Krishna (mantra).

Hare Krishna Golden Temple timings:

Morning

1. Mangal Aarti - 04.30 AM
2. Darshan Aarti - 07.15 AM
3. Pallaki & Guru Puja- 07.35 - 08.20 AM
4. Srimad Bhagavata Purana Class- 08.30 AM
5. Darshan Close- 12.15 PM

Evening

1. First Darshan- 5.15 PM
2. Tulasi Aarti - 06.45 PM
3. Sandhya Aarti - 07.00 PM
4. Shayan Aarti - 8.00 PM
5. Darshan Closes- 8.15 PM

Weekends

1. Afternoon closing time- 12.15 PM on weekdays and 12.30 PM on weekends
2. Evening closing time- 08.45 PM

== Festivals ==
HKM Golden temple celebrates festivals that are related to avatars of Lord Vishnu or with Vedic culture. Main festivals that are celebrated within the temple are:

- Rama Navami
- Brahmotsava
- Narasimha Jayanti
- Panihati Chida-dahi
- Ratha Yatra
- Balaram Jayanti
- Jhulan Utsav
- Sri Krishna Janmashtami
- Vyasa Puja
- Sri Radhashtami
- Deepotsava
- Govardhan Puja
- Vaikuntha Ekadashi
- Nityananda Trayodashi
- Gaura Poornima
- Sri Lakshmi Narasimha Swamy Abhishekam-Every month Swathi Nakshatra Day

== Social services ==
Hare Krishna Golden Temple also known as HKM Hyderabad provides free food to those in need through various food distribution programmes such as Akshaya Patra. and other programmes including Bhojanamrita Saddimoota and Annapoorana schemes. The visitors to the temple are provided free lunch from 12.30 PM through Nitya Annadana Seva .

== Gallery ==
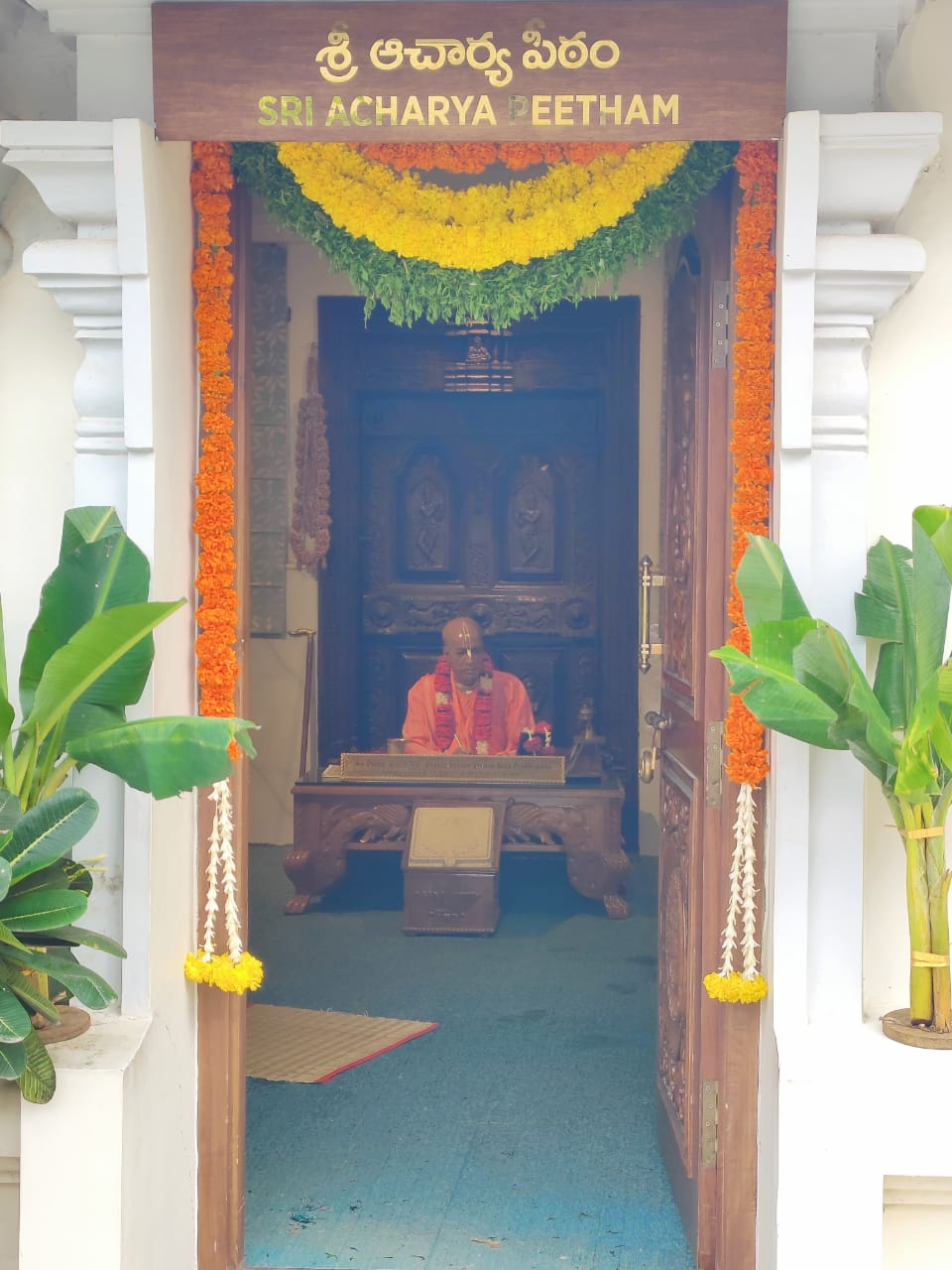
Shrine for Srila Prabhupad

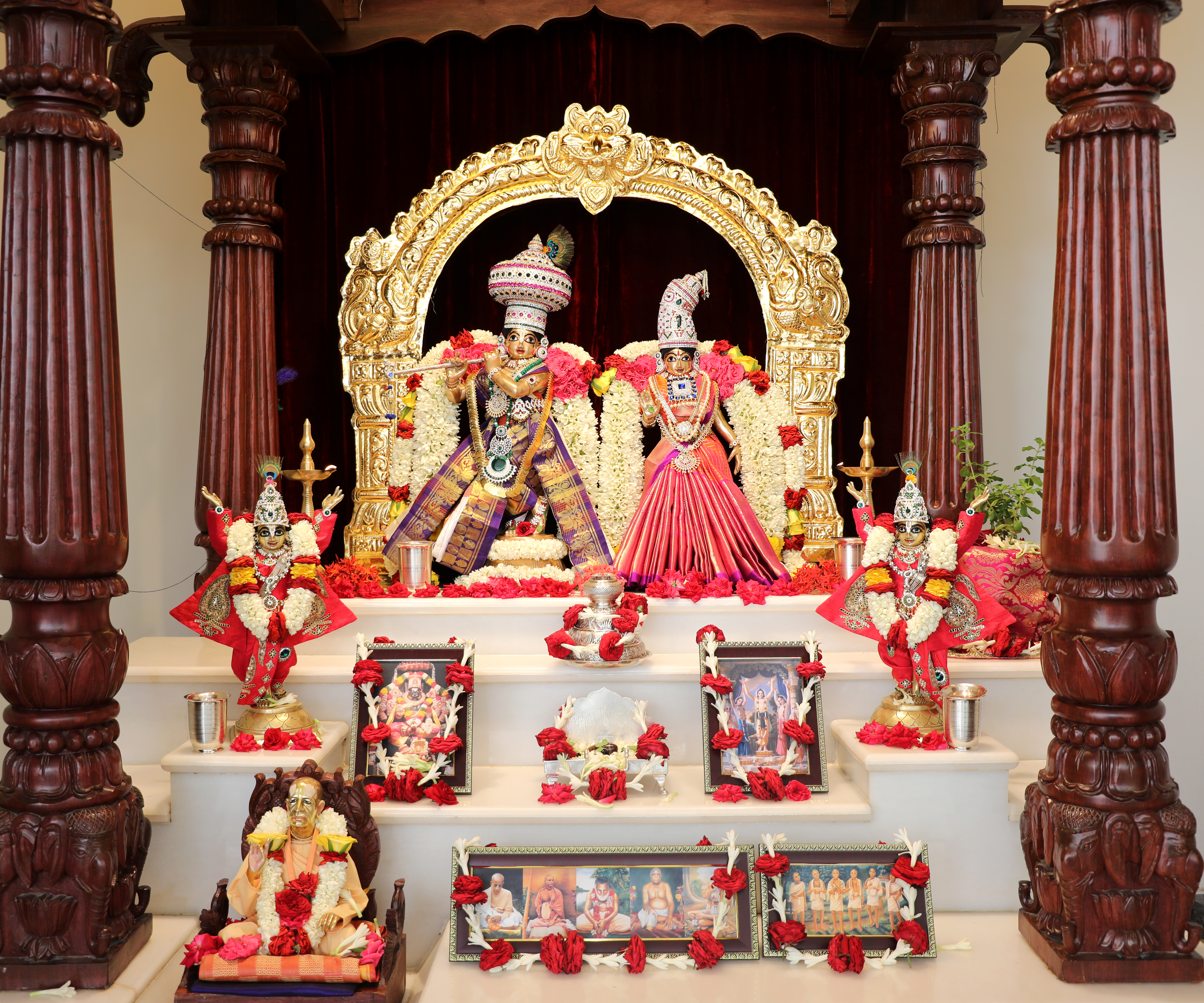
Altar of Sri Sri Radha Govinda with their associates

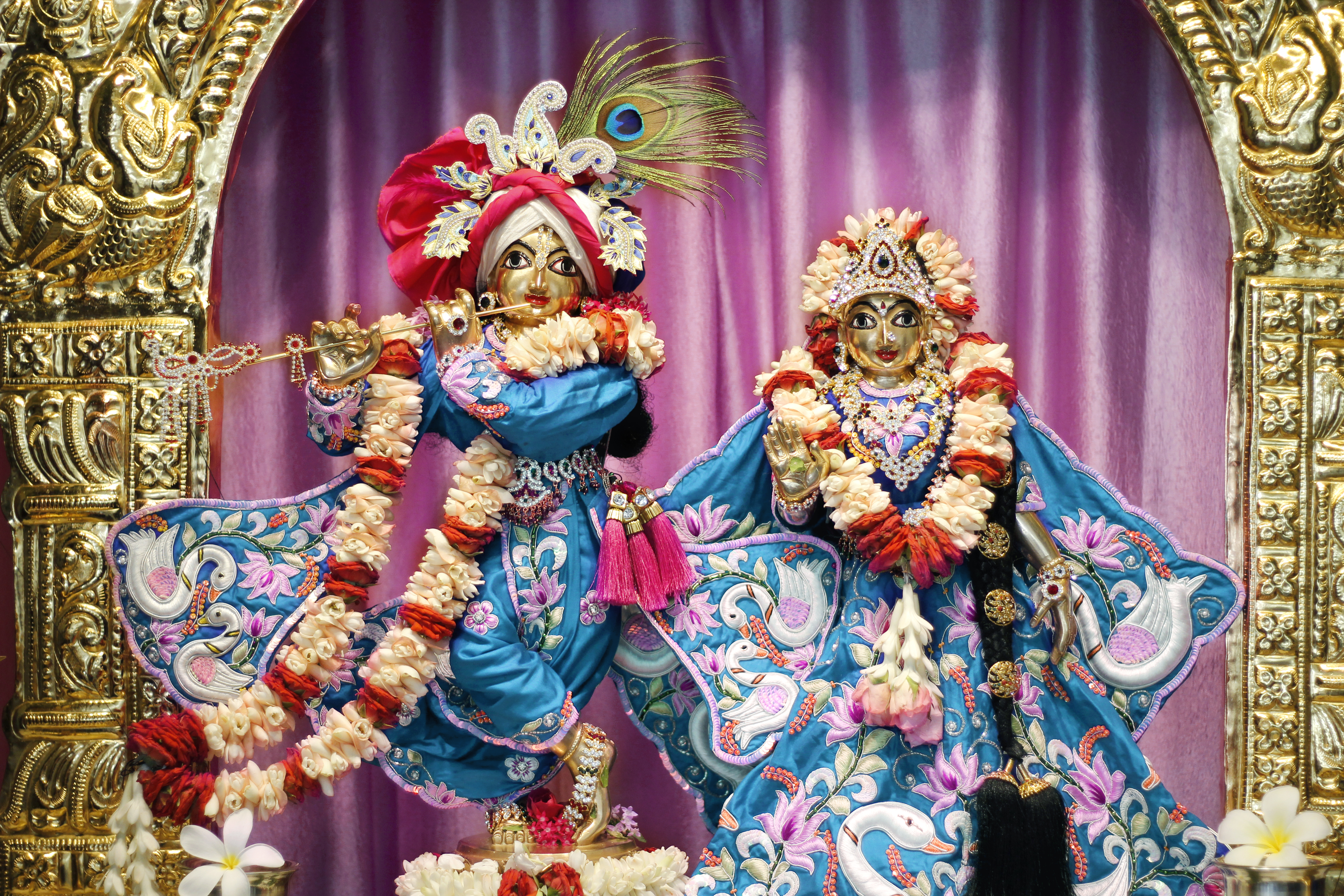
Sri Sri Radha Govinda

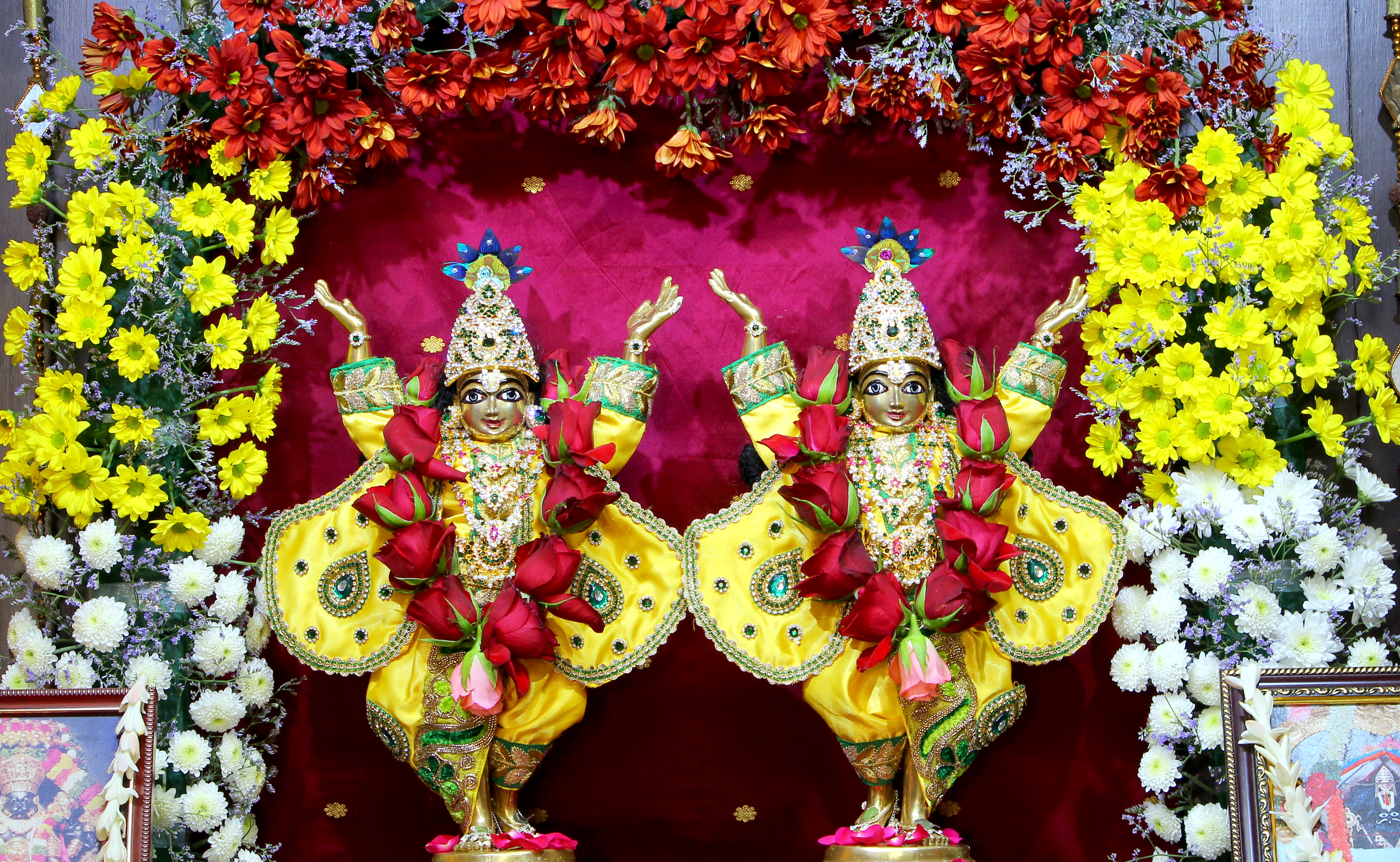
Sri Nitai Gauranga

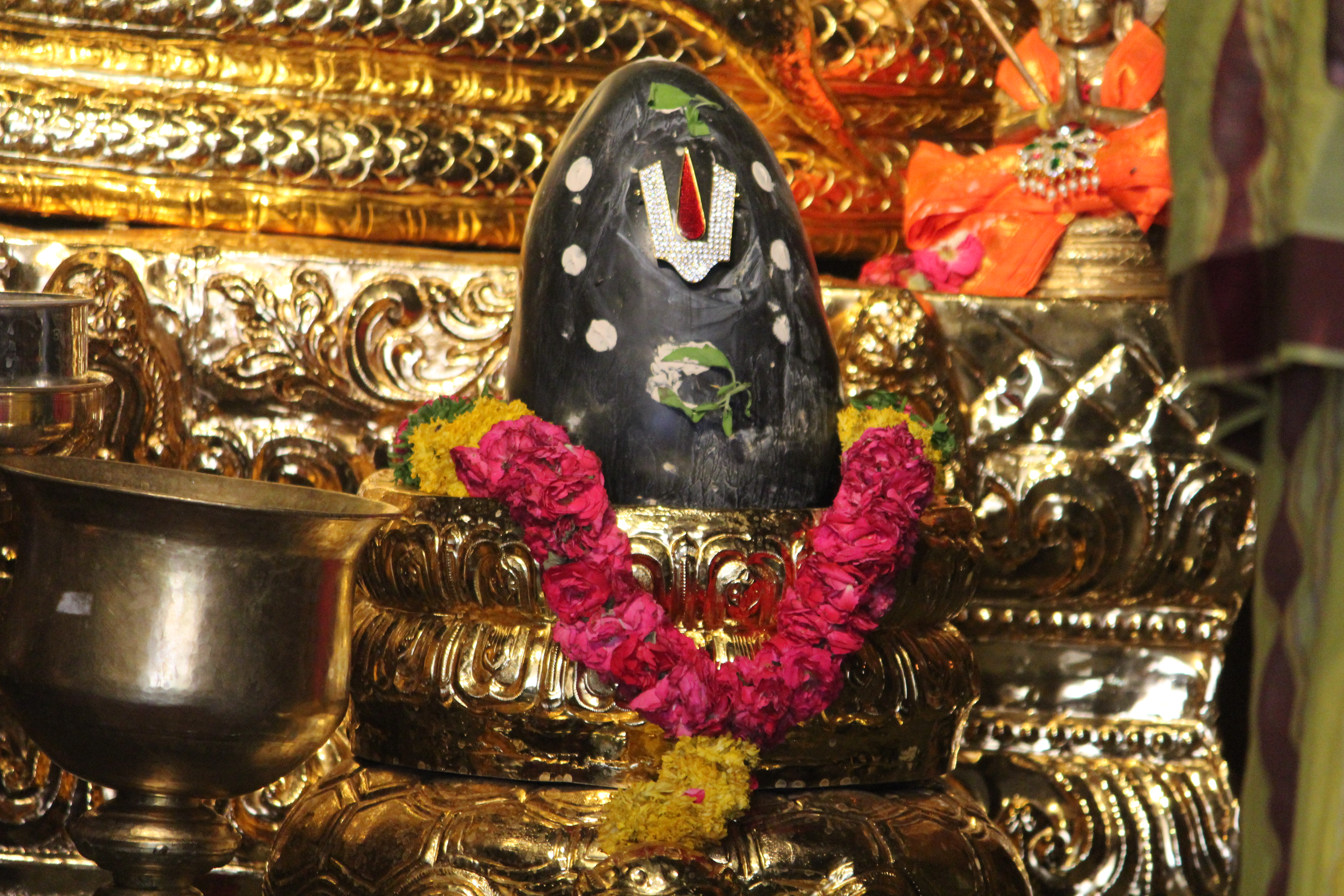
Rare kind of Saligrama

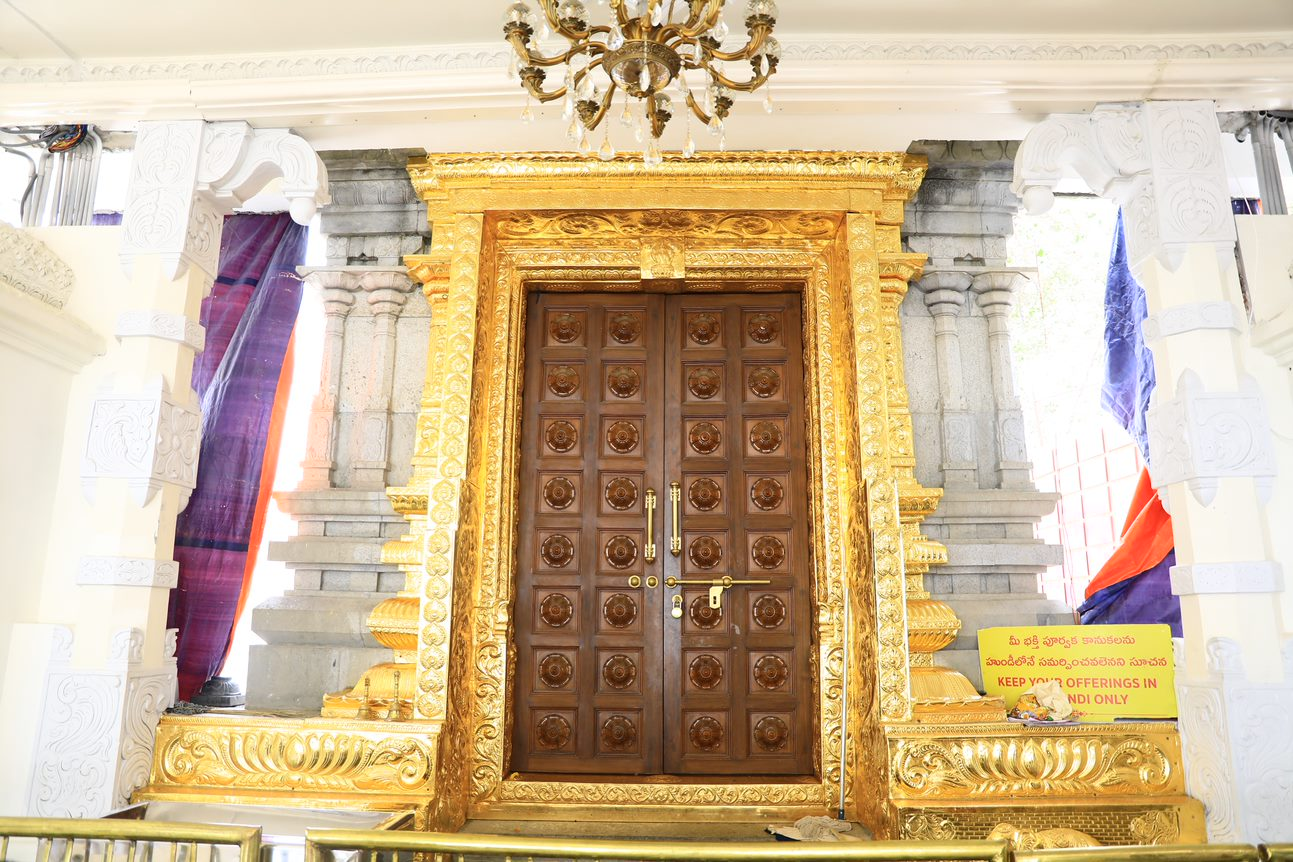
Sri Lakshmi Narasimma Swamy altar

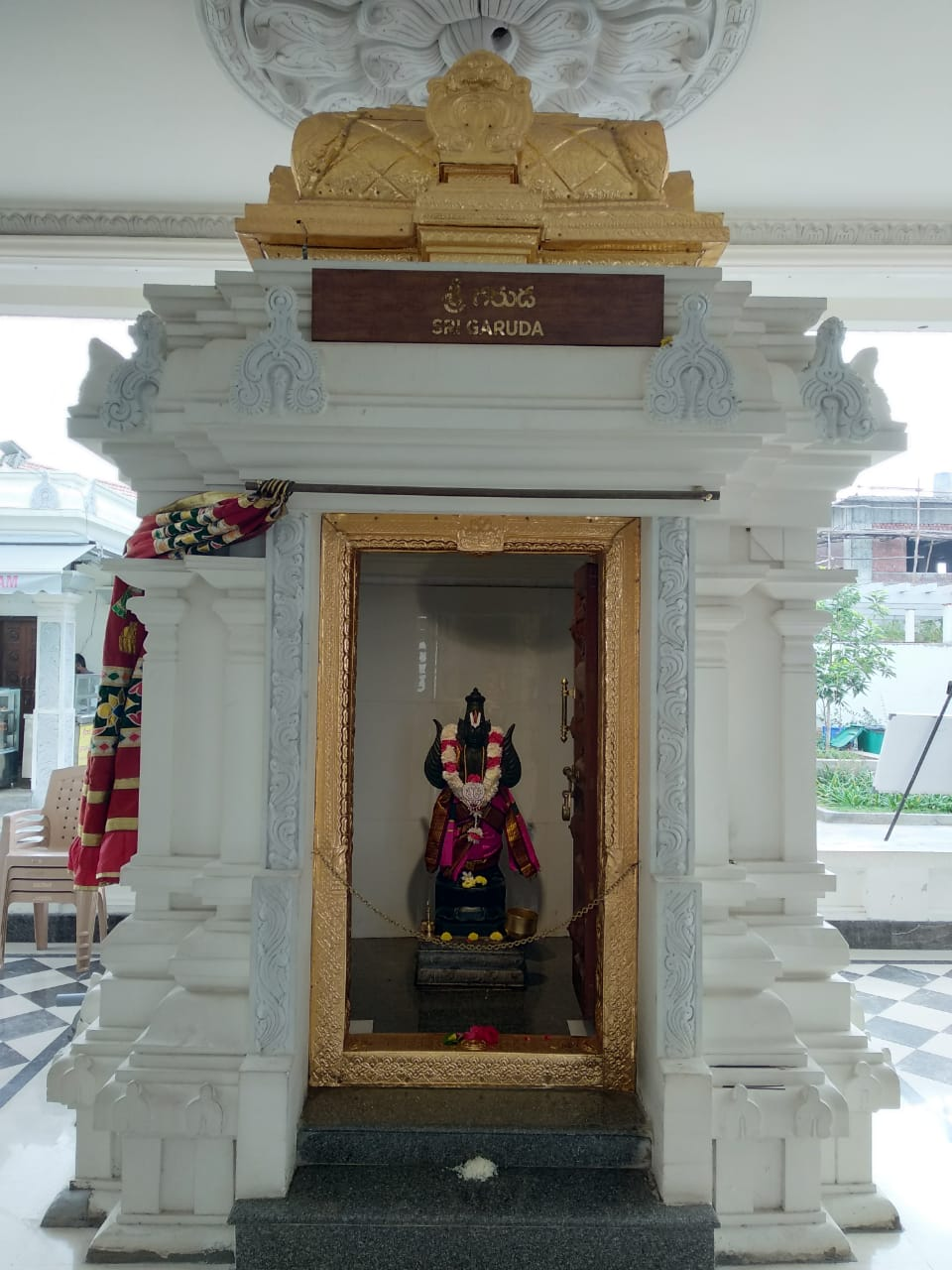
Altar of sri Garuda dev

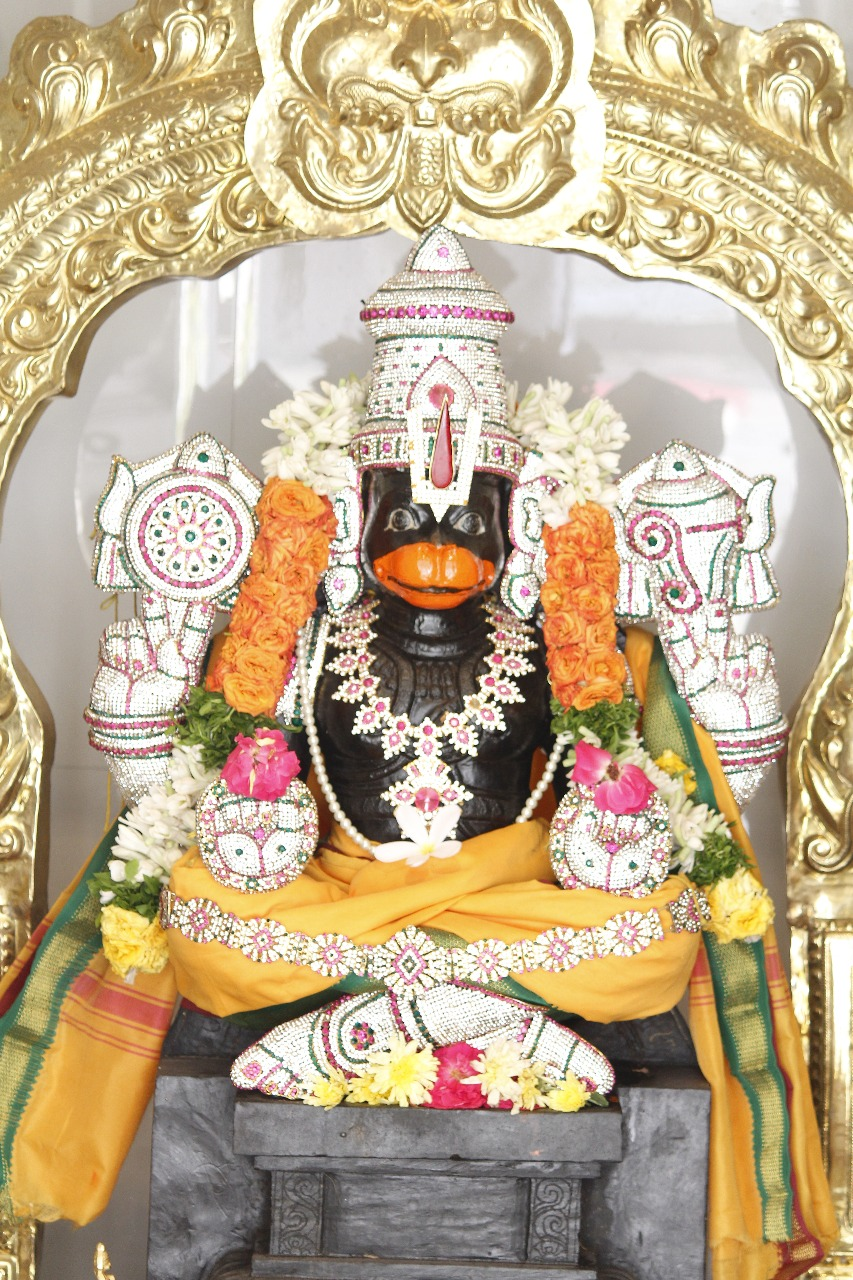
Japa Anjaneya Swamy

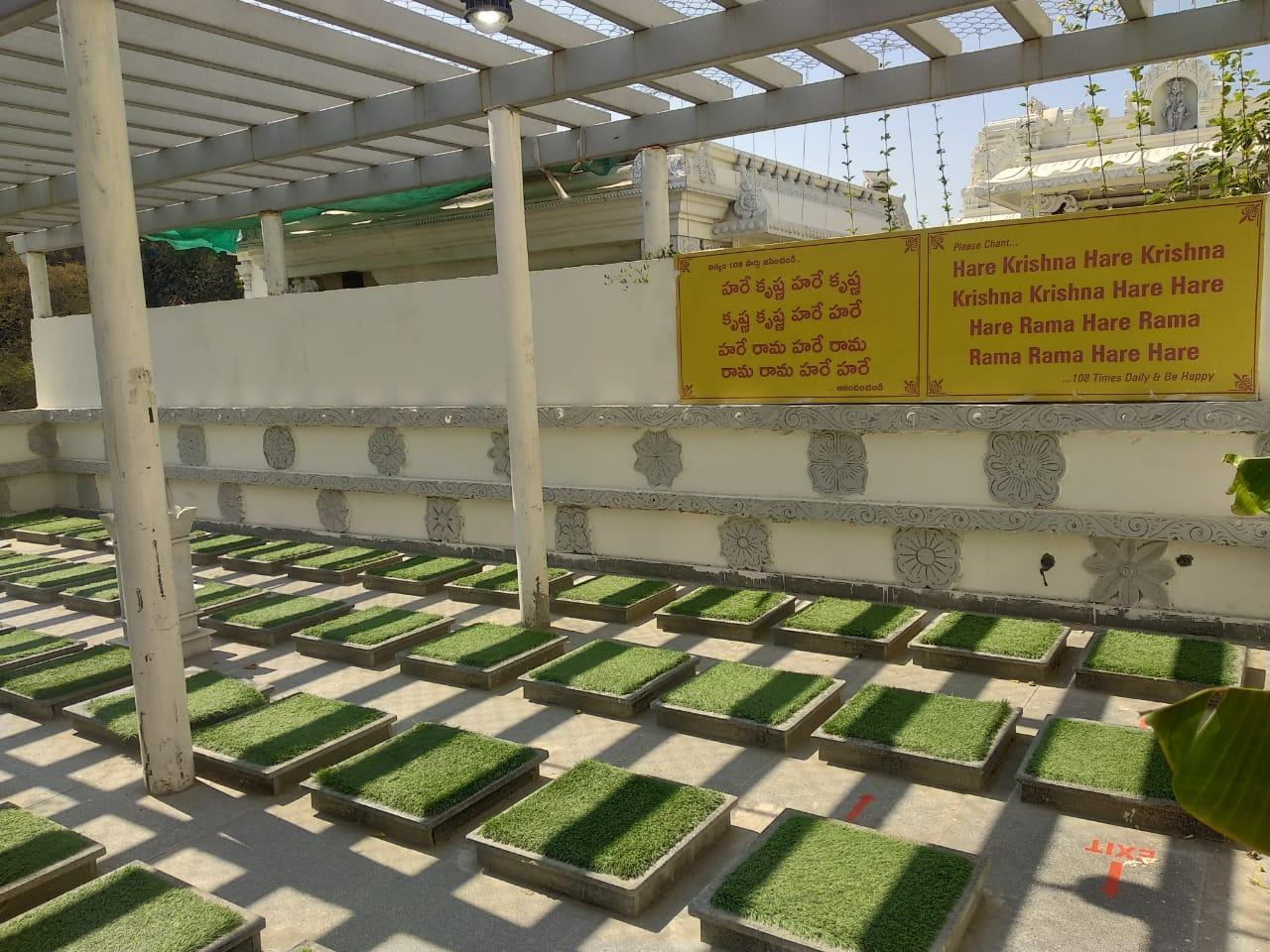
Japa Mandapam
