= Gowravaram =

- Village
- Interactive map of Gowravaram
- Location in Andhra Pradesh, India
- Country: India
- State: Andhra Pradesh
- District: NTR
- Mandal: Jaggayyapeta

Government
  - Type: Gowravaram

Area
  - Total: 10.32 km^{2} (3.98 sq mi)

Population (2011)
  - Total: 4,781
  - Density: 463.3/km^{2} (1,200/sq mi)

Languages
  - Official: Telugu
- Time zone: UTC+5:30 (IST)
- PIN: 521178
- Telephone code: GVRM
- Vehicle registration: AP–16

Gowravaram is a village in NTR district of the Indian state of Andhra Pradesh. It is located in Jaggayyapeta mandal of Vijayawada revenue division.In the Route of NH65 It is one of the villages in the mandal to be a part of Andhra Pradesh Capital Region.
