= Jaggayyapeta mandal =

- Mandal
- Interactive map of Jaggayyapeta mandal
- Location in Andhra Pradesh, India
- Coordinates: 16.8920°N 80.0976°E
- Country: India
- State: Andhra Pradesh
- District: NTR
- Headquarters: Jaggayyapeta

Area
  - Total: 246.67 km^{2} (95.24 sq mi)

Population (2011)
  - Total: 126,275
  - Density: 511.92/km^{2} (1,325.9/sq mi)

Languages
  - Official: Telugu
- Time zone: UTC+5:30 (IST)

Jaggayyapeta mandal is one of the 20 mandals in NTR district of the state of Andhra Pradesh in India. It is under the administration of Nandigama revenue division and the headquarters are located at Jaggayyapeta town. Krishna River flows through the mandal and is bounded by Penuganchiprolu, Nandigama, Chandarlapadu mandals of Krishna district, part of Guntur district, Nalgonda and Khammam districts of Telangana.

== Towns and villages ==
As of 2011 census, the mandal has 18 settlements. It includes 1 town and 24 villages.

The settlements in the mandal are listed below:

1. Annavaram
2. Anumanchipalle
3. Balusupadu
4. Bandipalem
5. Buchavaram
6. Budawada
7. Chillakallu
8. Garikapadu
9. Gandrai
10. Gowravaram
11. Jaggayyapeta (CT)
12. Jayanthipuram
13. Kowthavari Agraharam
14. Malkapuram
15. Muktheswarapuram
16. Pochampalle
17. Ramachandrunipeta
18. Ravikampadu
19. Ravirala
20. Shermohammedpet
21. Takkellapadu
22. Tirumalagiri
23. Torraguntapalem
24. Tripuravaram
25. Vedadri

Note: (CT)-Census town

== See also ==
- Vijayawada revenue division
