= Chillakallu =

- Village
- Interactive map of Chillakallu
- Location in Andhra Pradesh, India
- Coordinates: 16.8936°N 80.1387°E
- Country: India
- State: Andhra Pradesh
- District: NTR
- Mandal: Jaggayyapeta

Government
  - Type: Panchayati raj
  - Body: Chillakallu gram panchayat

Area
  - Total: 1,387 ha (3,430 acres)

Population (2011)
  - Total: 11,734
  - Density: 846.0/km^{2} (2,191/sq mi)

Languages
  - Official: Telugu
- Time zone: UTC+5:30 (IST)
- Area code: +91–
- Vehicle registration: AP

Chillakallu is a village in NTR district of the Indian state of Andhra Pradesh. It is located in Jaggayyapeta mandal of Vijayawada revenue division. It is one of the villages in the mandal, to be a part of Andhra Pradesh Capital Region.
