= Ramtek Kevala Narasimha temple inscription =

Epigraphic record documenting the construction of a Shiva temple in Maharashtra, India

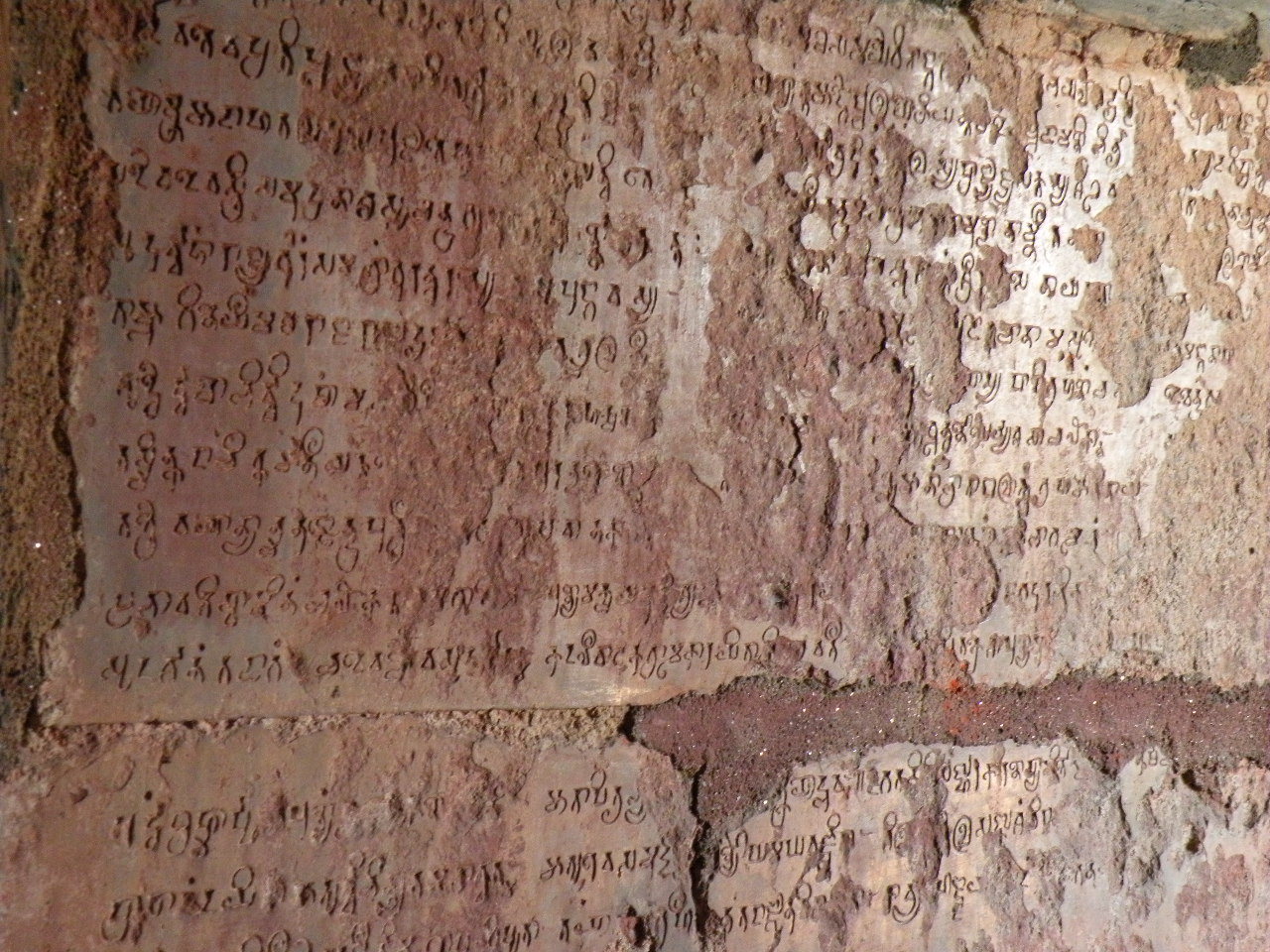
Detail of the Narasiṃha temple inscription at Rāmtek

The Rāmtek Kevala Narasiṃha temple inscription is an epigraphic record of the Vākāṭaka dynasty, documenting the construction of a temple dedicated to the Narasiṃha or lion-man incarnation (avatāra) of Viṣṇu. The inscription dates to the 5th-century CE. The inscription is presently built into an interior wall of the Kevala Narasiṃha temple at Ramtek, in Nagpur district, Maharashtra, India. The inscription is written in 15 lines of Sanskrit, in the later Brahmi script, but is damaged. It records the lineage of the Vākāṭaka rulers and the foundation of the temple. The inscription is composed in Puṣpitāgrā, Upajāti and Śloka metres.

According to Hans Bakker, the temples complex features several avatars of Vishnu, and there is "a perfect match between the opening verse of the inscription and the Trivikrama sculpture preserved in situ amidst the temple ruins to the north-east of the Narasimha temple".

== Historical significance ==
The Rāmtek Kevala Narasiṃha temple inscription is a key and unique record for the history of the Vākāṭaka kings and their interrelations with the Gupta dynasty. Like many eulogistic inscriptions it provides the genealogy of the donor's family, in this case a daughter of Prabhāvatīguptā, herself the daughter of Chandragupta II. Of particular significance is the fact that the inscription records the marriage of Prabhāvatīguptā's daughter to Ghaṭotkaca, the king of central India who made a bid for supremacy and who is mentioned in the Tumain inscription of Kumāragupta. This daughter returned to the Vākāṭaka realm after the death of her husband.

== Publication ==
The inscription, first reported in 1982-83, was mentioned by Hans T. Bakker in 1989. Bakker published a critical reading in 1993 with Harunaga Isaacson. Further improvements were published in 1997.

== Translation ==
Note: The translation here loosely follows that published by Bakker in 1993; for the latest version, readers are referred to that published by Bakker in 1997.

He is victorious, whose (colour resembles) the depths of a water-laden raincloud, who [...] clarified butter in a stream [...], whose [...] limbs are swollen at the occasion of a sacrifice (that is the battle), and who is looked at with gazes that tremble with fright [...]. (1) [...] royal seer [.. .]. (2)

[one verse possibly lost]

To whose feet the crowned heads of kings pay tribute: [...] whose [.. .] receptacle for holding (the lustre) from (his) footstool, (a lustre) that arises from (his) might [. . .]. (3) To him [...] the edge of the ocean [...]. (4)

[one verse possibly lost]

(She), being worshipped in the residence of her father like a deity [...], grew up like a [...] flame of a fire in which abundant ghee has been poured. (5) Her [. . .] raised [. . .]. (6)

[one verse possibly lost]

After (a number of) (sons) had been born to them in succession, famous and furnished (with virtues), a daughter called MUṆḌĀ, resembling the lustre of the moon, was born as (their) younger sister. (7) [. . .] streak [. . .]. (8)

[one verse possibly lost]

At all times the conduct of this King (deva), CANDRAGUPTA, lord of the three oceans, was perfect: the sovereign (gave) his daughter to the illustrious RUDRASENA (a, mine of) virtues. (9)

[one verse (10), possibly two, lost]

To (this) [...] great hero, who was like a beast of burden, (carrying) the entire burden of (his) kingdom which was very difficult to bear, [...] a son named GHAṬOTKACA (was born). (11) [...] woman [.. .]. (12)

[one verse possibly lost]

Then, after he had seen that niece (of his) [...], who was a palace Lakṣmī, [...] (this) king paid his respects (to her) and married her. (13) The lord of the gods [. . .] (minister) [...]. (14)

[one verse possibly lost]

(He pleased) the minds of wise men with refined language, [. . .] of [. . .] whose eyes were like (blue) lotuses [. . .], mendicants with floods of wealth and the peoples with (his) fame. (15) He [. . .] king [. . .]. (16)

[one verse possibly lost]

When at a certain time [...] he of desirable appearance [...] by/with Indra, [...] (her) brother brought the proud woman [...], back to his own residence with force. (17) [one verse (18), possibly two, lost] There, whatever [...], (increasing dharma), the king's daughter performed, of those [...] this share [...]. (19)

[one verse (20), possibly two, lost]

And she (then respectfully) caused to be made the Lord of the Earth and Master of PRABHĀVATĪ the sake of everlasting merit [.. .]. (21) [...] the origin of the world [...]. (22)

[one verse (23), possibly two, lost]

After she of extreme (lustre), had made in the village KADALĪVAṬAKA a water reservoir SUDARṢANA(' lovely to behold') and (installed) the beautiful (sudarsana) god, (24) [...] whose hair is yellow, for the sake of merit [. . .]. (25)

[one verse (26), possibly two, lost]

Half of the merit assigned to the gods, [.. .] for (her) father and mother [...] accruing from the deed [...]. (27) Of (him) of infinite might who is the cause of the sustenance and destruction of the world, the [. ..] of the (Vedic) seers [.. .]. (28)

[one verse (29), possibly two, lost]

Reflecting that that temple for her beloved (begetter) is transitory, she, free of sins, for the sake of a mass of merit for her mother alone, (30) [...] stone [...], resembling stone [... ], for a long time [...]. (31)

[one verse (32), possibly two lost]

By him, who was chosen by her and is carrying out her orders, (about) to proclaim this fame that will last so long as there is light, (33) a great kāvya [...]. (34)

[one or two verses possibly lost]

== See also ==
- Indian inscriptions
