= Vedadri Narasimha Temple =

Hindu temple

- 7th Nava Narasimha Temple
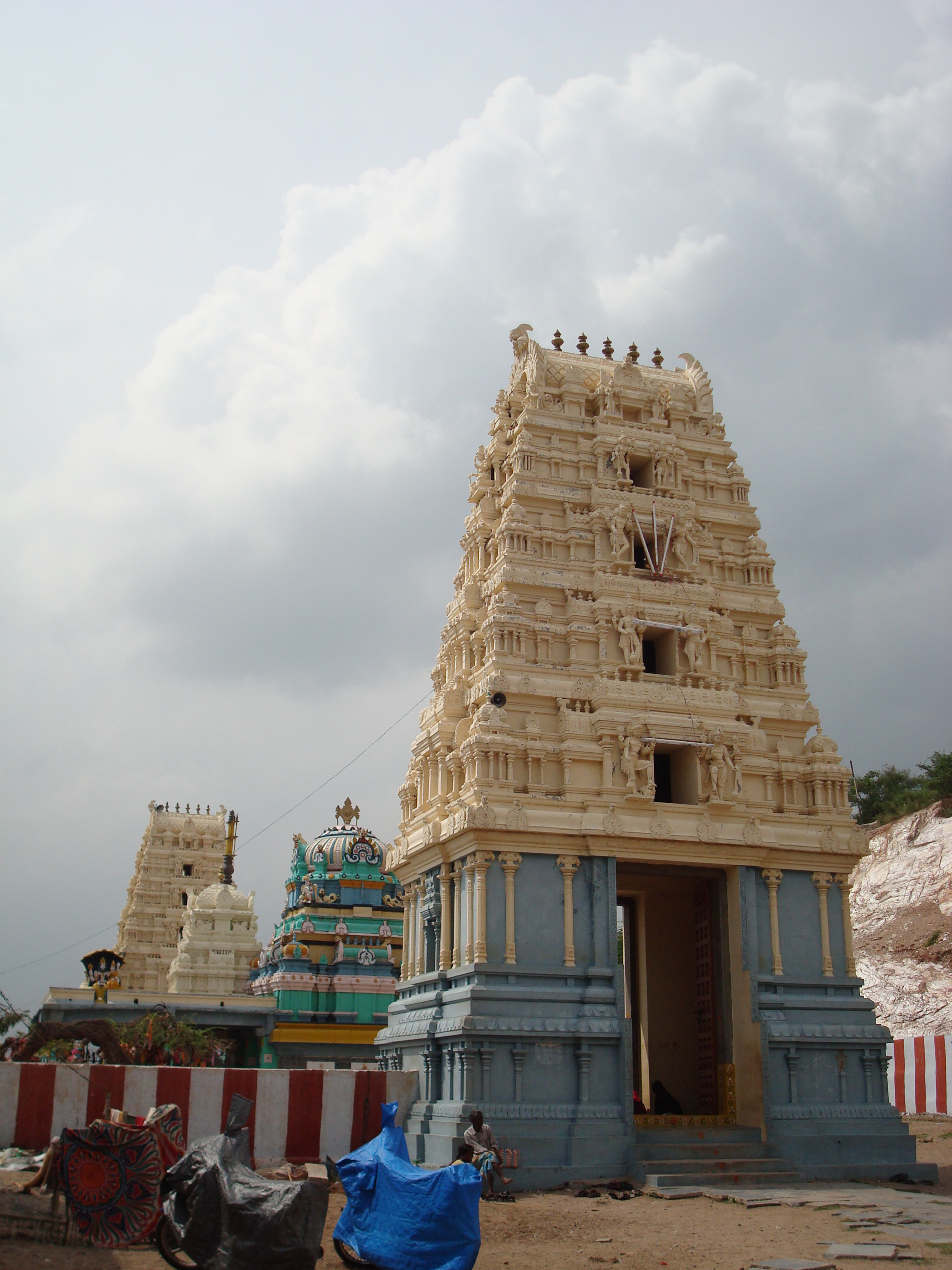
- Vedadri Narasimha Temple

Religion
- Affiliation: Hinduism
- District: NTR
- Deity: Lord Narasimha

Location
- Location: Vedadri
- State: Andhra Pradesh
- Country: India
- Interactive map of Vedadri Narasimha Temple
- Coordinates: 16.815°N 80.125°E

Architecture
- Type: Dravidian architecture

Vedadri Narasimha Temple is a Hindu temple located in the town of Vedadri, Andhra Pradesh, India. It is dedicated to the worship of Narasimha. This temple is a major pilgrimage site in Andhra, attracting thousands of devotees every year, and it is one of the Pancha Narasimha Kshetras. The temple is located on the bank of the Krishna River.

== History ==
According to the temple's historical tradition (sthalapurana), Vedadri represents the Vedas in the form of a hill. This mythological tradition relays that a demon named Somakasura stole the Vedas from Brahma and hid them in the ocean. The panicked gods are said to have prayed to Vishnu, who appeared in the form of Narasimha to rescue the Vedas by turning them into Vedadri on the river Krishna.

The Vedadri Narasimha Temple is said to have gained prominence during the reign of the Kakatiya Empire. Narayana Tirtha, a noted Telugu Vaishnavite saint and composer, was a routine visitor to this temple. In the 1800s, Raja Vasireddy Muktiswara Prasad Nayudu, a zamindar ancestor of Muktyala Raja, renovated and added to the temple by renewing the dhwajastabham and building 108 flight of stairs for pilgrims to reach the Krishna River from the hillock that houses the temple. A popular, annual festival is held at the temple to celebrate Narasimha Jayanati on Vaisakha Suddha Purnima.

== Shrine ==
In the temple, the main image of deity shows Narasimha with Lakshmi sitting on his left lap. There are five forms of Narasimha that are worshipped at this temple, which is why it is called the Pancha Narasimha Kshetram. These five forms are Vira Narasimha, Salagrama Narasimha, Jwala Narasimha, Lakshmi Narasimha, and Yoga Narasimha. The temple also has separate shrines for the 12 Tamil Vaishnavite Saints (Alvars) and for the founders of the Vaikhanasa Agamas, including Rishis Kashyapa and Atri.

== Gallery of the temple ==
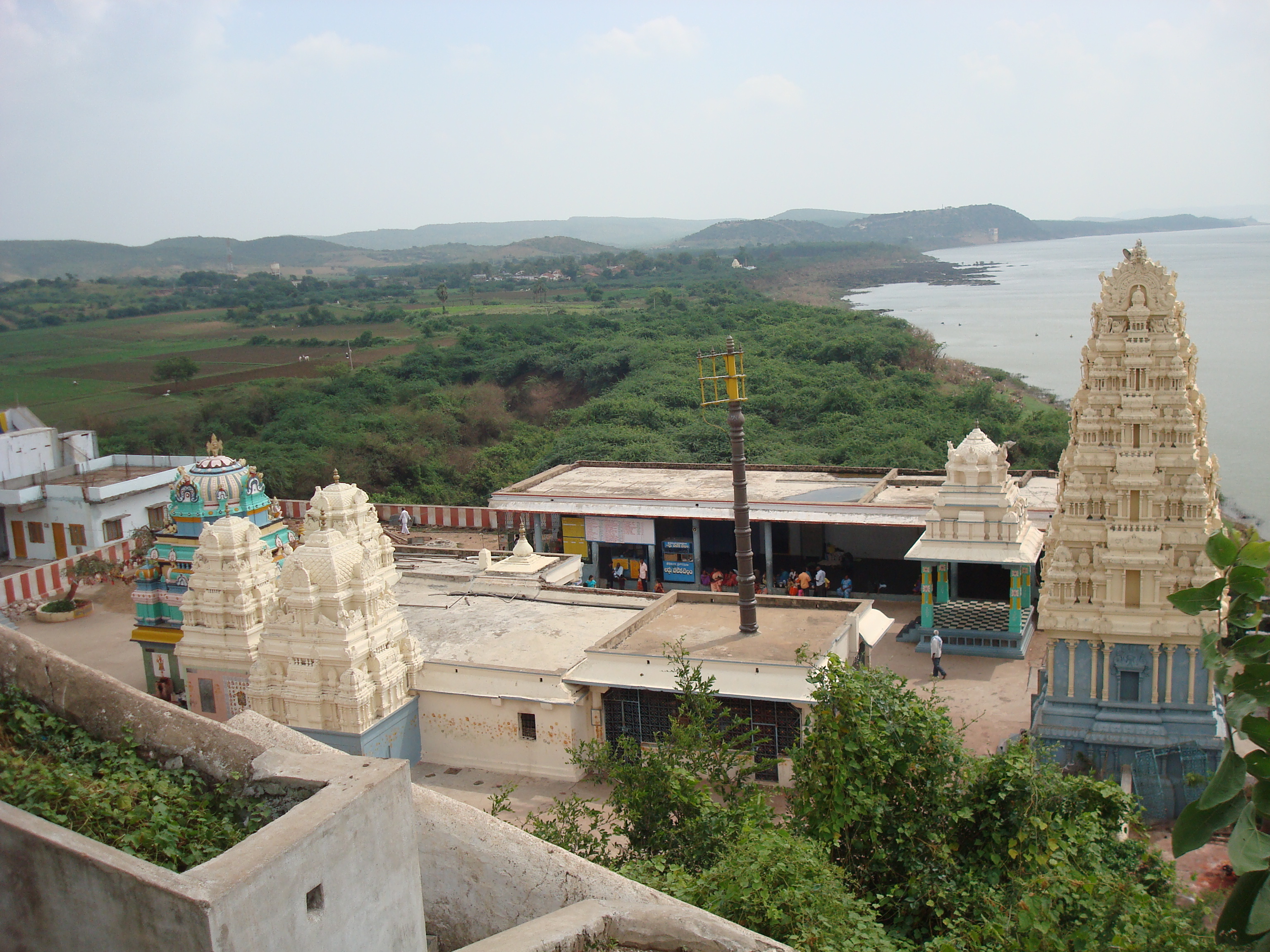
Temple Complex of Vedadri Narasimha Temple

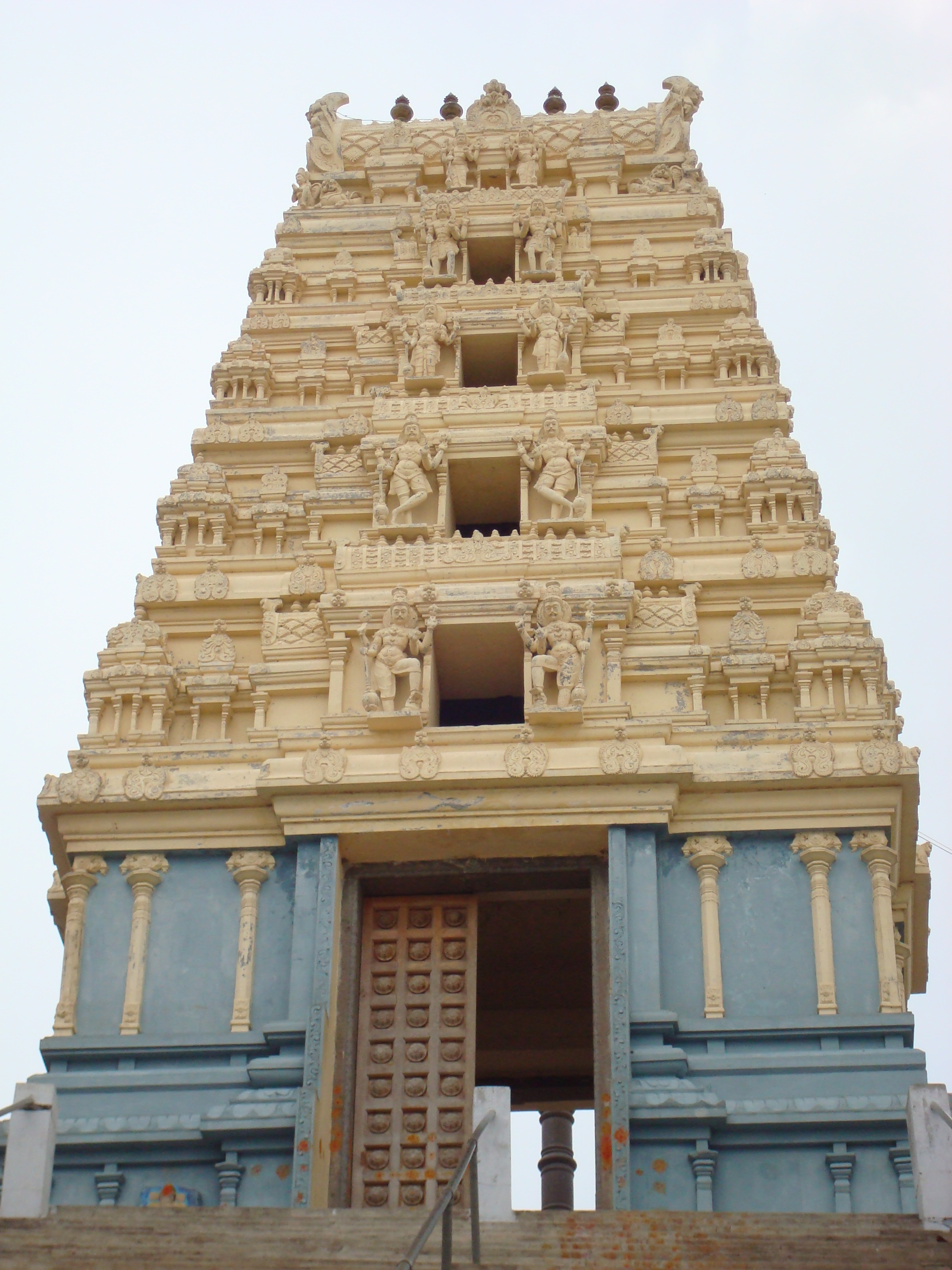
Temple Gopuram of Vedadri Narasimha Temple

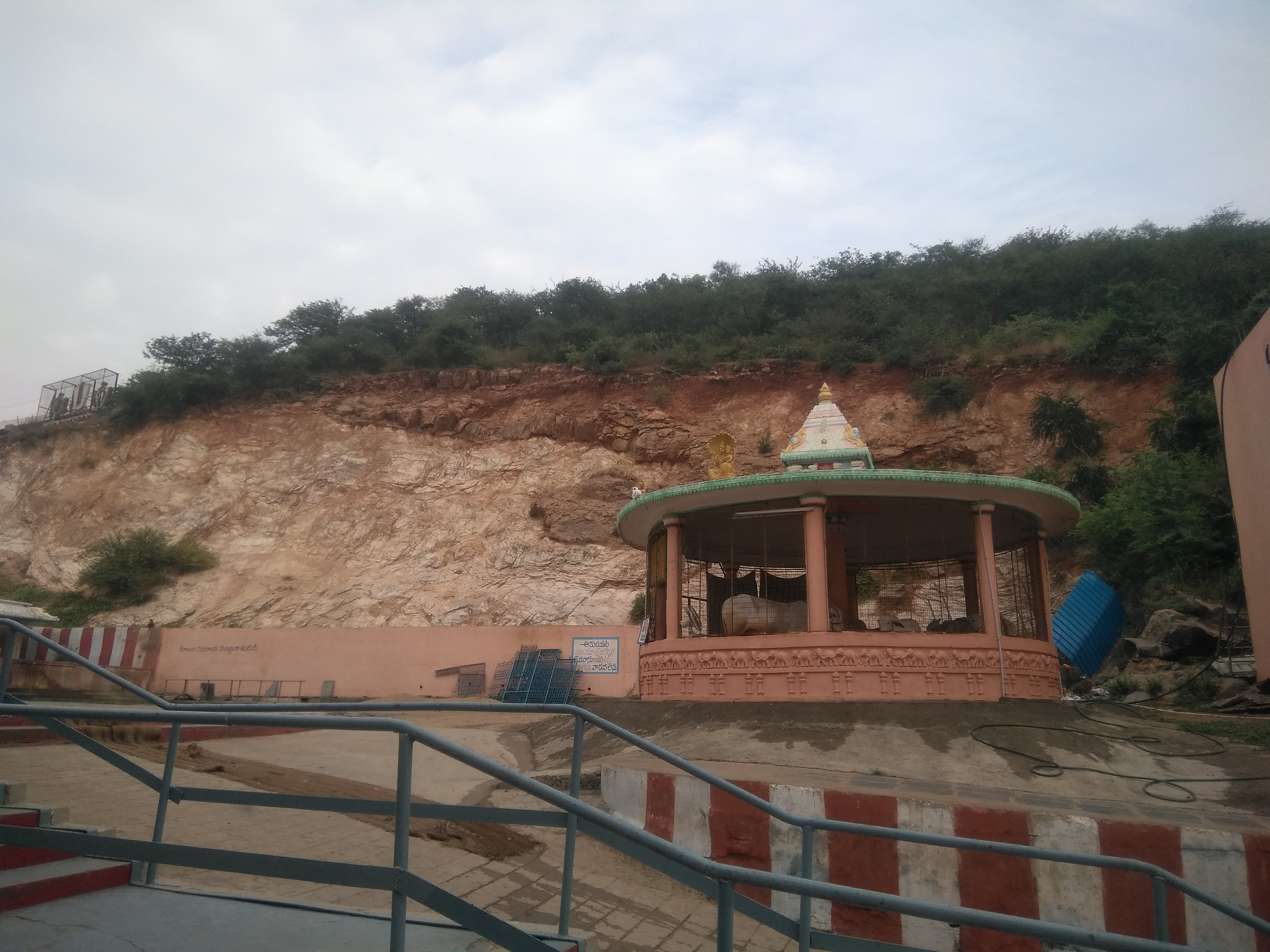
Goshala and Flight of Stairs at the Vedadri Narasimha Temple
