= Jaggayyapeta =

- Town
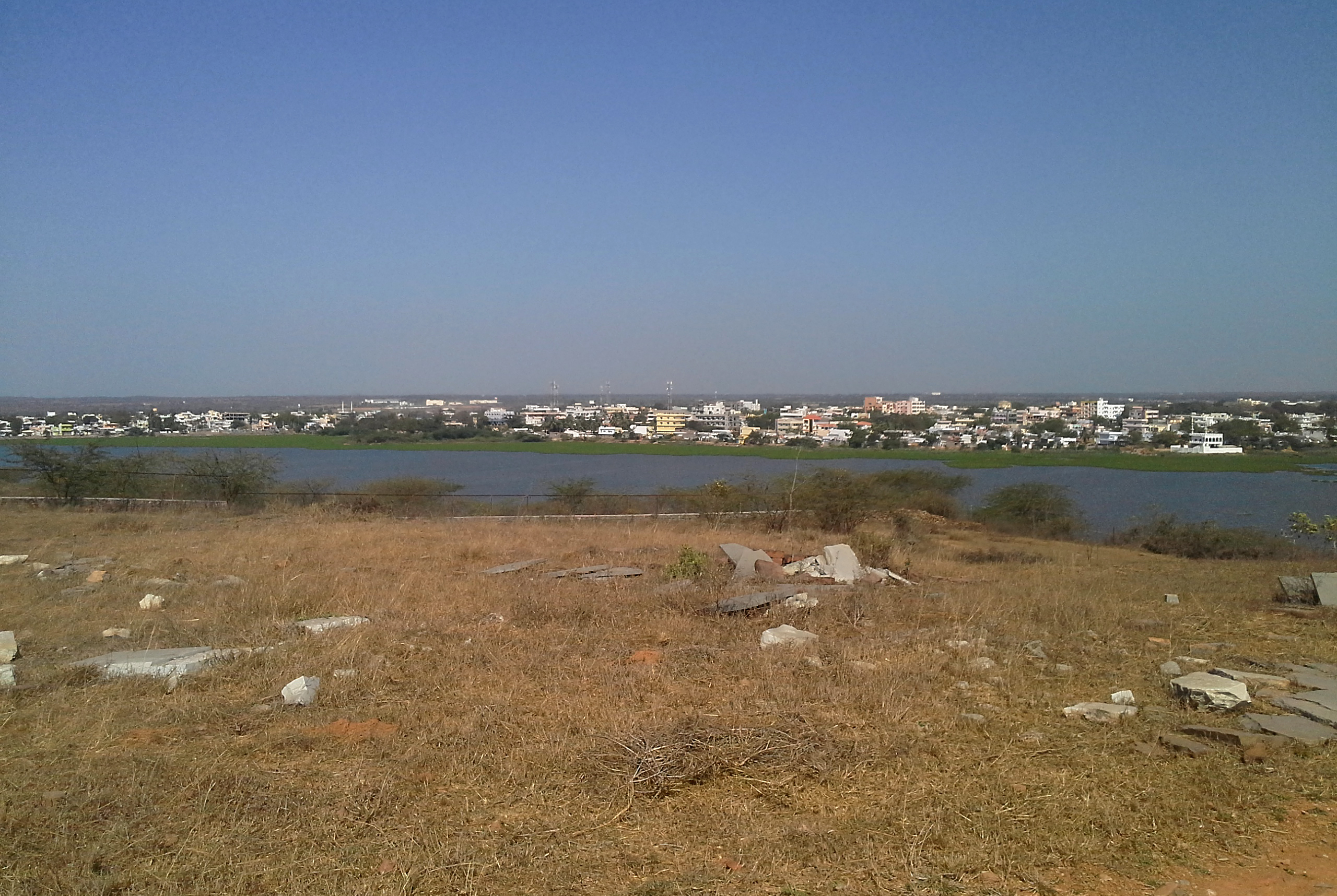
- Jaggayyapeta town from the Buddhist stupa site
- Nickname: Dongala bethavolu
- Interactive map of Jaggayyapeta
- Location in Andhra Pradesh, India Jaggayyapeta (Andhra Pradesh)
- Coordinates: 16.8920°N 80.0976°E
- Country: India
- State: Andhra Pradesh
- Region: Coastal Andhra
- District: NTR

Government
  - Body: Jaggayyapet Municipality
  - Member of Legislative Assembly: Sriram Rajagopal(Tatayya)
  - Member of Parliament: Kesineni Chinni

Area
  - Total: 60 km^{2} (23 sq mi)
  - Rank: 2nd in district
- Elevation: 55 m (180 ft)

Population (2011)
  - Total: 53,530
  - Density: 890/km^{2} (2,300/sq mi)

Languages
  - Officials: Telugu
- Time zone: UTC+5:30 (IST)
- PIN: 521 175
- Telephone code: +91–8654
- Vehicle registration: AP–16, AP-39, AP-40
- Lok Sabha constituency: Vijayawada
- Vidhan Sabha constituency: Jaggayyapet

Jaggayyapeta, also spelled “Jaggaiahpet”, is a town in NTR district of the Indian state of Andhra Pradesh, located just southwest of the border with Telangana. It is also the mandal headquarters of Jaggayyapeta mandal of Nandigama revenue division. Jaggayyapet is the second biggest town in the district followed by Vijayawada.The town is located on the banks of the Paleru River which is a tributary of the Krishna River.

== Etymology ==
Jaggaiahpeta was governed by a ruler, by name Sri Rajah Vasireddy Venkatadri Nayudu. It is said that he founded two towns, namely, Jaggayyapeta, named after his father Jaggayya, and Achampeta, named after his mother Atchamma.

== History ==
Government records suggest the founder of the town was Venkatadri Nayudu, who developed and renamed the village of Betavolu to Jaggayyapeta. The region was then infested with robbers and hence the old village was called Dongala Betavolu (Robbers' Betavolu). For some time, Jaggayyapeta was mentioned in Government records with Betavolu written in brackets. This region has an ancient history, the innocent-looking mound 'Dhanam Bodu', lying east of Jaggayyapeta, has in it the remains of an ancient stupa, which has been lying there for 2,000 years. Jaggayyapeta became a municipality in 1987 and Sreeram Badari Narayanarao was elected as 1st municipal chairman.

=== Artifacts ===
The archaeological excavations around the town of Jaggayyapeta have found Buddhist stupas dating back to 200 BC. Sculptures and scriptures of Neolithic, Megalithic and medieval periods are also found around the town.

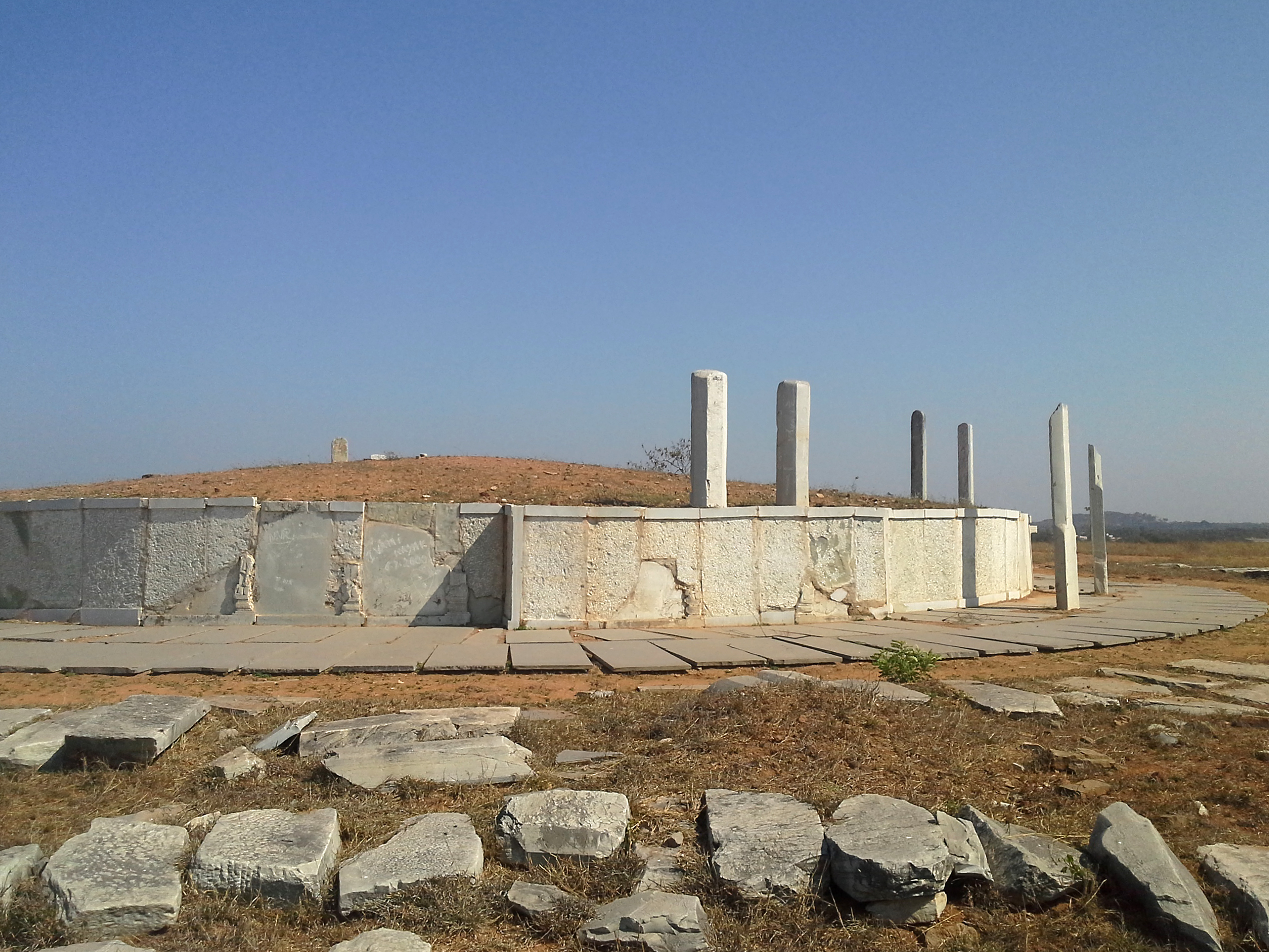
A View of Jaggayyapeta Buddhist stupa, with remains of reliefs.

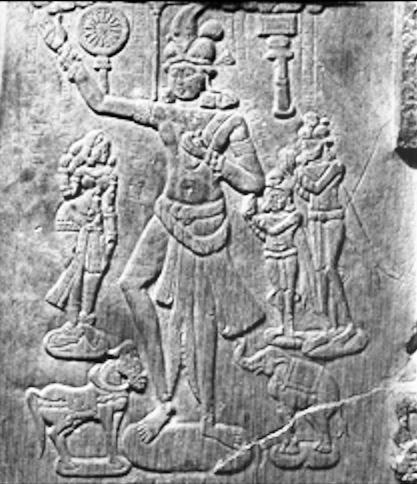
Chakravartin from Jaggayyapeta Stupa

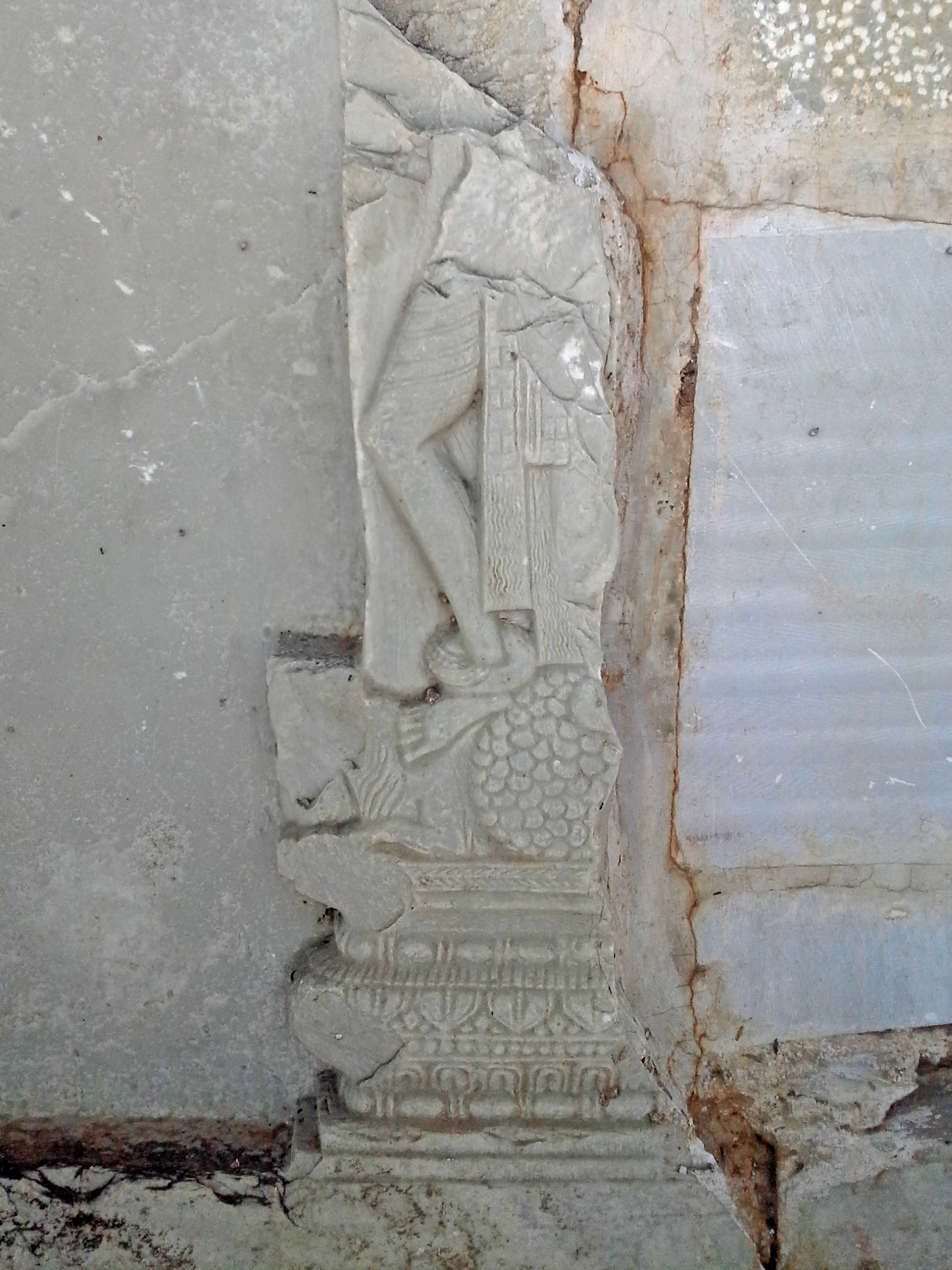
Sculpted frieze ruins on Jaggayyapeta Buddhist stupa

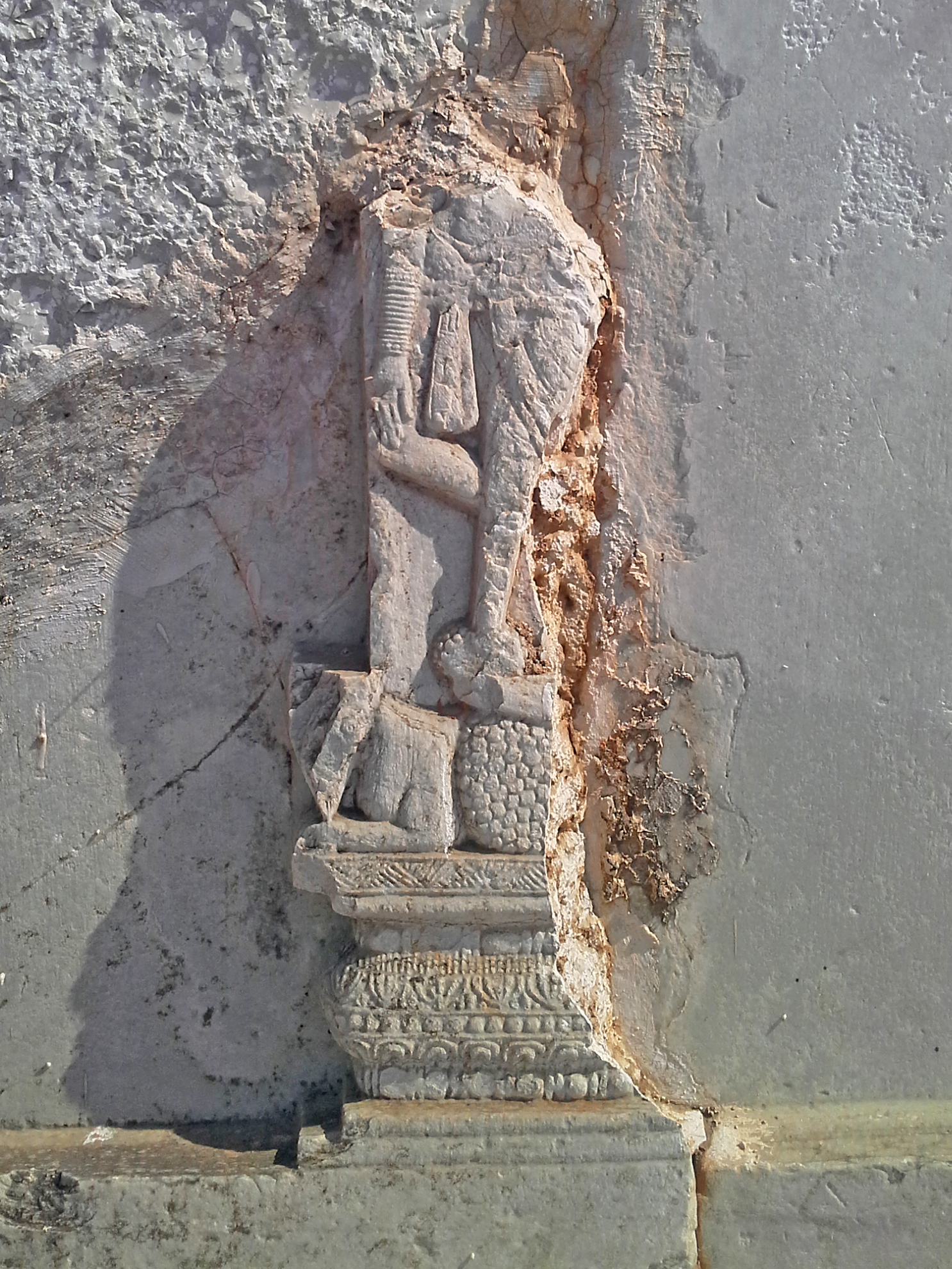
Sculpted relief on Jaggayyapeta Buddhist stupa.

== Governance ==
Civic administration

The municipality of Jaggayyapeta was formed in the year 1988. It is a II–Grade Municipality with 32 wards spread over an area of 23.50 km^{2} (9.07 mi^{2}).

== Economy ==
The town’s mango orchards are abundant with Banginapalli and Totapuri varieties, which are even exported to foreign countries. It is one of the major industrial corridors in the Krishna district. The region’s cement plants are located in and around Jaggayyapeta. It has more than 10 cements plants around and there are more than 100 gold merchants in the town.

== Transport ==
Jaggayyapeta is located near to NH 65, which connects Pune and Machilipatnam. The Andhra Pradesh State Road Transport Corporation operates buses from Jaggayyapeta bus station which also has a bus depot. The town has a total road length of 109.00 km (67.73 mi).

== Education ==
The primary and secondary school education is imparted by government, aided and private schools, under the School Education Department of the state. The medium of instruction followed by different schools are English and Telugu.

== See also ==
- List of urban local bodies in Andhra Pradesh
