= Narasimha Satakam =

Telugu poem compilation

Narasimha Satakam is a compilation of 100 poems by Seshappa. They are primarily based on devotion and morality and set in simple language.

Compilation of this complete work is in Telugu Wikisource.

== See also ==
- Simhadri Narasimha Satakam, written by Gogulapati Kurmanatha Kavi
