= Vedadri =

- Village
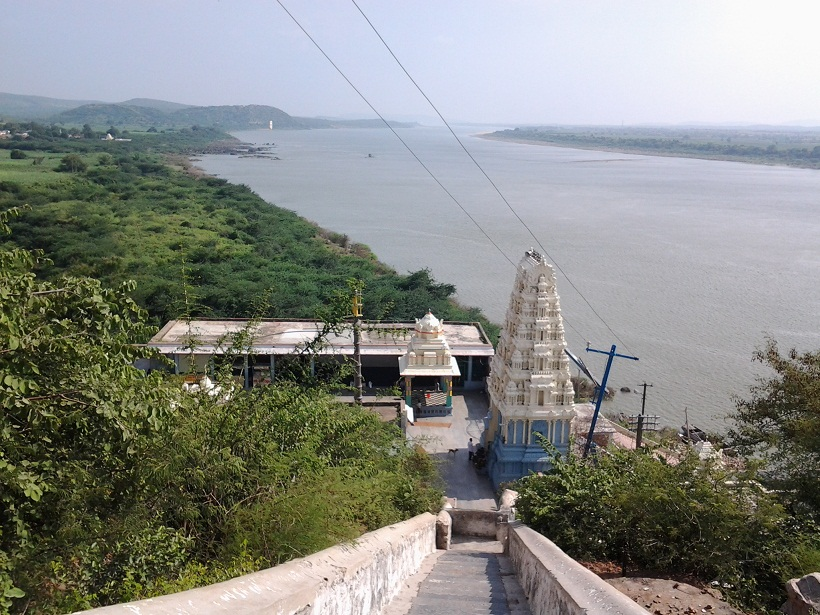
- Vedadri Temple and River Krishna
- Interactive map of Vedadri
- Location in Andhra Pradesh, India
- Coordinates: 16°48′37″N 80°07′50″E
- Country: India
- State: Andhra Pradesh
- District: NTR
- Mandal: Jaggayyapeta

Government
  - Type: Panchayati raj
  - Body: Vedadri gram panchayat

Area
  - Total: 1,339 ha (3,310 acres)

Population (2011)
  - Total: 2,155
  - Density: 160.9/km^{2} (416.8/sq mi)

Languages
  - Official: Telugu
- Time zone: UTC+5:30 (IST)
- Area code: +91–
- Vehicle registration: AP

Vedadri is a village in NTR district of the Indian state of Andhra Pradesh. It is located in Jaggayyapeta mandal of Vijayawada revenue division. It is one of the villages in the mandal to be a part of Andhra Pradesh Capital Region. The village is one of the religious destination for Hindus, with the Vedadri Narasimha Temple on the banks of River Krishna.
