= Lakshminarasimha Temple =

Lakshminarasimha Temple may refer to these Hindu temples in India dedicated to the deities Lakshmi Narasimha:

- Lakshmi Narasimha Swamy Temple, Devarayanadurga, Karnataka
- Abaya Hastha Swayambu Sri Lakshmi Narasimha Swamy Temple, Agaram Village, Hosur, Tamil Nadu
- Lakshmi Narasimha Temple, Antarvedi, Andhra Pradesh
- Lakshmi Narasimha Temple, Bhadravati, Karnataka
- Lakshmi Narasimha Temple, Dharmapuri, Telangana
- Lakshminarasimha Temple, Haranhalli, Karnataka
- Lakshminarasimha Temple, Javagal, Karnataka
- Lakshmi Narasimha Temple, Mangalagiri, Andhra Pradesh
- Yogananda Lakshmi Narasimha Swamy Temple, Mattapalli, Telangana
- Lakshmi Narasimhar Temple, Narasinghapuram, Tamil Nadu
- Lakshmi Narasimha Temple, Nuggehalli, Karnataka
- Lakshminarasimha Temple, Vignasante, Karnataka
- Lakshmi Narasimhaswamy Temple, Sholinghur, Tamil Nadu
- Shurpali Shri Lakshmi Narasimha Temple, Karnataka
- Varaha Lakshmi Narasimha temple, Simhachalam, Andhra Pradesh
- Sri Lakshmi Narasimha Temple, Thalassery, Kerala
- Sri Lakshmi Narasimha Swamy Temple, Yadagirigutta, Telangana
- Lakshmi Narasimha swamy temple, Penna Ahobilam
- Sri Lakshmi Narasimha Swamy Temple, Korukonda, Andhra Pradesh

== See also ==
- Lakshmi (disambiguation)
- Narasimha (disambiguation)
