= Lakshmi (disambiguation) =

Lakshmi is one of the principal goddesses in Hinduism.

Lakshmi or Laxshmi may also refer to:

== Film and television ==
- Lakshmi (1977 film), Indian Malayalam-language film
- Lakshmi (1979 film), Indian Tamil-language film
- Lakshmi (1982 film), Indian Hindi-language film
- Lakshmi (2006 film), Indian Telugu-language drama
- Lakshmi (2013 film), Indian Kannada-language film
- Lakshmi (2014 film), Indian Hindi-language film
- Lakshmi (2018 film), Indian Tamil-language film
- Laxmii, 2020 Indian Hindi-language film
- Lakshmi (2006 TV series), Indian Tamil-language soap opera
- Lakshmi (2024 TV series), Indian Tamil-language TV series

== Other uses ==
- Lakshmi (name), including a list of people with the name

== See also ==
- Laxmi Nagar (disambiguation)
- Mahalakshmi (disambiguation)
- Laxminarayan (disambiguation)
- Lakshminarasimha Temple (disambiguation)
- Lakmé, an opera by Léo Delibes whose title is the French form of Lakshmi
- Lakshmi Mills, Indian textile manufacturer
  - Lakshmi Machine Works, owned by Lakshmi Mills
- Lakshmi Narasimha, an iconographical depiction of Narasimha
- Lakshmi Planum, a feature of the planet Venus
- TVS Matriculation Higher Secondary School, formerly known as TVS Lakshmi School
