= Sri Lakshmi Narasimha Temple, Thalassery =

Sri Lakshmi Narasimha Temple
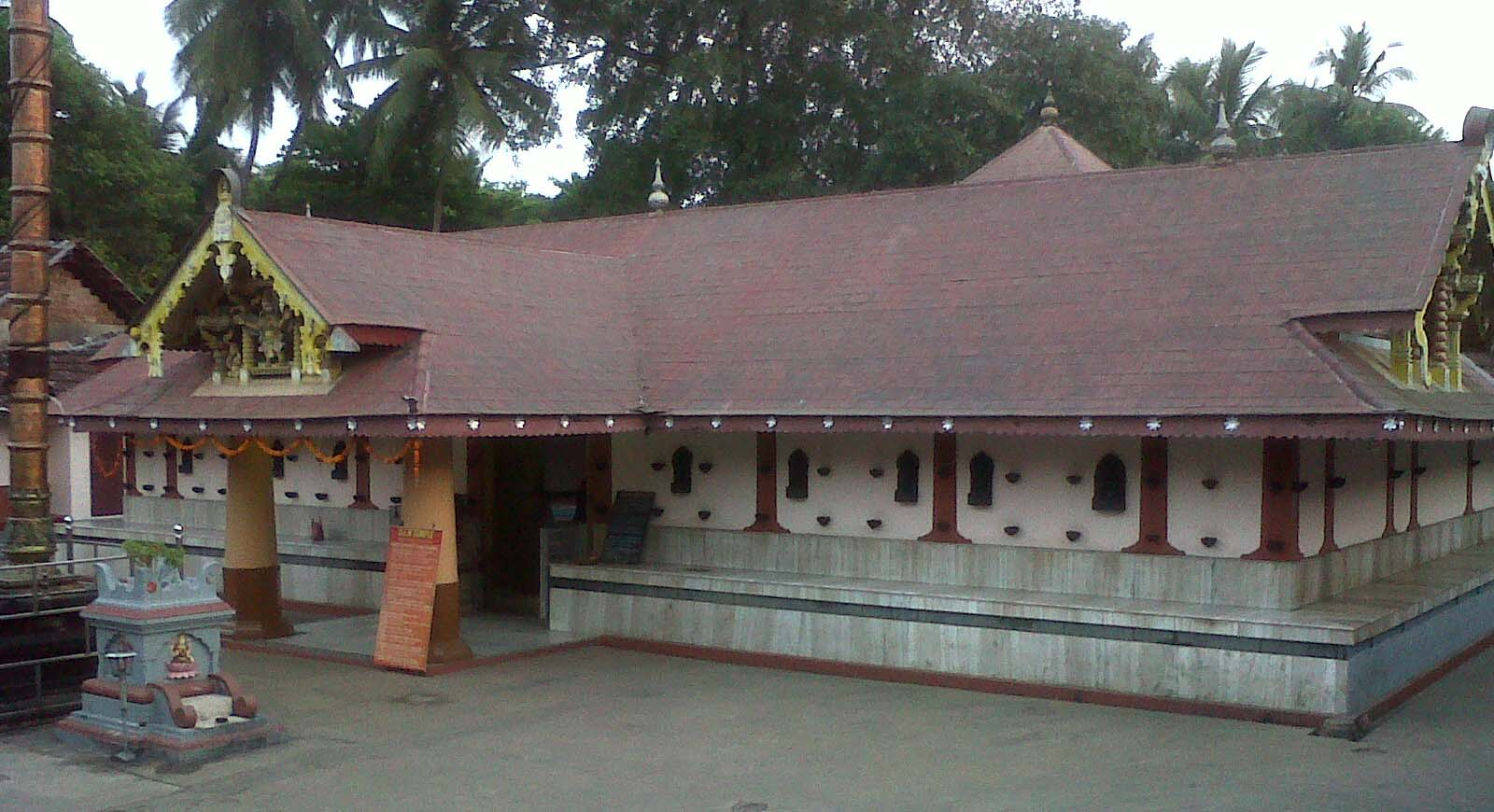

- Location in Kerala

Religion
- Affiliation: Hinduism
- Deity: Sri Lakshmi Narasimha Sri Lakshmi Venkataramana

Location
- Location: Thalassery
- State: Kerala
- Country: India
- Interactive map of Sri Lakshmi Narasimha Temple
- Coordinates: 11°44′46″N 75°29′31″E

Sri Lakshmi Narasimha Temple is a Hindu temple associated with Gowda Saraswatha Brahmins (GSB) in and around Thalassery.

The temple is located in Thalassery town, in the Kannur district of Kerala. The temple and the prathishta faces North which is a unique feature. The temple was established in 1831 CE.

== History ==
A small group of GSBs migrated from Goa settled in Tellichery (Thalassery) in the latter half of 17th century and early part of 18th century. They built a small shrine dedicated to Kodanda Rama, in Tellichery.

A rich GSB Merchant named Devdas Bhandari granted the idol of Lakshmi Narasimha to the shrine in the early 19th Century. A proper temple was built in the site of the old shrine in 1831. This prathishta was done by H.H. Srimad Sumatheendra Tirtha Swamiji in 1831 on Samvatrasra Vaishaka masa Shukla Panchami, Monday, Punarvasu Nakshtra of the Shaka era. H.H.Srimad Sumatheendra Tirtha was the 15th pontiff of Kashi Mutt, Varanasi. Apart from the main deity of Lakshmi Narasimha, the deities Kodanda Rama, Venkataramana with his consorts of Sridevi and Bhudevi were installed.

== Deities ==
=== Patta Deva ===
The Garbhagriha or sanctum sanctorum holds the main deities (Patta Deva). The Garbha Griha is a Bahu-vera Vidhana, meaning more than one idol is installed in the same Garbha Griha. Garbha Griha has a three tiered Simhasana (throne) on which the deities are installed.

On the top most level in the centre is Lakshmi Narasimha, flanked by Pattabhi Narasimha and Veera Vittala (Vithoba) on either side. On the second tier are Kodanda Rama along with his brother Lakshmana and consort Sita, on either side of this group are Hayagriva, Varadaraja with his consorts and Gopalkrishna. On the lower most tier are Venkataramana along with his consorts Sridevi and Bhudevi. On either side of this group are Hanuman and Garuda. The saligramas and Naga devatas are installed on a separate Peetha below the Simhasana.

=== Uthsava Vigraha ===
Venkataramana is used as the Uthsava Vigraha (festival deity).

=== Sub Deities or Upadevathas ===
The temple complex consists of an outer ‘prakara’ or quadrangle which includes the shrines of Hanuman, Ganapathy, Lakshmi, and Vithoba-Rakhumai. It also contains a Copper clad Dhwaja Stambha or Flag staff on which the temple flag is hoisted during Brahma Rathotsava. A shrine dedicated to Shiva is located near the temple pond.

== Main festivals ==
- Brahma Rathotsava
- Karthik Pournami
- Navarathri

== Worship ==
The deities are worshiped in the Temple as per Dwaitha traditions.

All the Aradhana is done by hereditary Goud Saraswat Brahmin priests, who have performed the services for generations. Only these priests have the right to touch and offer services to the deities. These set of Archakas are called Bhat.

== How to Reach ==
The temple is near Mukund Maller road, about 0.5 km from Thalassery Railway station and Bus stand. The nearest airport is Kannur International Airport (24.5 km).

== See also ==
=== Goud Saraswat Brahmin ===
- Goud Saraswat Brahmin
- Goud Saraswat Brahmins of Cochin
- List of Goud Saraswat Brahmins
- GSB Temples in Kerala

=== Maths Followed By Goud Saraswat Brahmin ===
- Kashi Math
- Gokarna Math
- Shri Gaudapadacharya Math
- Chitrapur Math
