= Lakshmi (name) =

Lakshmi, or Laxmi, is a name derived from Lakshmi, one of the principal goddesses in Hinduism. People with the name include:

- Lakshmi (actress) (Yaragudipadi Venkata Mahalakshmi, born 1952), Indian actress
- Lakshmi (writer) (1921–1987), Indian writer
- Laxmi Agarwal (born 1990), Indian acid attack survivor and activist
- Laxmikant Berde (1954–2004), actor
- Lakshmi Kant Jha (1913–1988), Indian bureaucrat and diplomat
- Lakshmi Menon (actress) (born 1996), actress
- Lakshmi Menon (model) (born 1981), model
- Lakshmi N. Menon (1899–1994), Indian freedom fighter and politician.
- Lakshmi Mittal (born 1950), Indian-born British steel magnate
- Lakshmi Nakshathra, stage name of Lakshmi Unnikrishnan K (born 1991), Indian TV and radio presenter
- Lakshmi Narayanan (born 1953), Indian businessman
- Panabaka Lakshmi, Indian politician
- Lakshmi Persaud (born 1939), Trinidad-born, British-based writer
- Lakshmi Pratury, Indian entrepreneur, curator, and speaker
- Raai Laxmi (Lakshmi Rai), Indian actress
- Lakshmi Sahgal (1914–2012), Indian revolutionary, Army officer, and politician
- Lakshmi Shankar (1926–2013), Indian singer
- Lakshmi Singh (born. c. 1972), American broadcaster
- Lakshmi Tatma (born 2005), born with eight limbs
- Lakshamilavan (1899–1961), Thai princess
- N. P. Jhansi Lakshmi (1941–2011), Indian politician
- Padma Lakshmi (born 1970), model
- Lakshmy Ramakrishnan (born 1970), Tamil actress
- Sri Lakshmi (actress), Indian Telugu-language comic actress

== See also ==
- Lakshmi (disambiguation)
- Rani of Jhansi, or Rani Lakshmibai
