= Lakshmi Narasimha swamy temple, Penna Ahobilam =

Hindu temple in Andhra Pradesh, India

Lakshmi Narasimha Swamy Temple, Penna Ahobilam
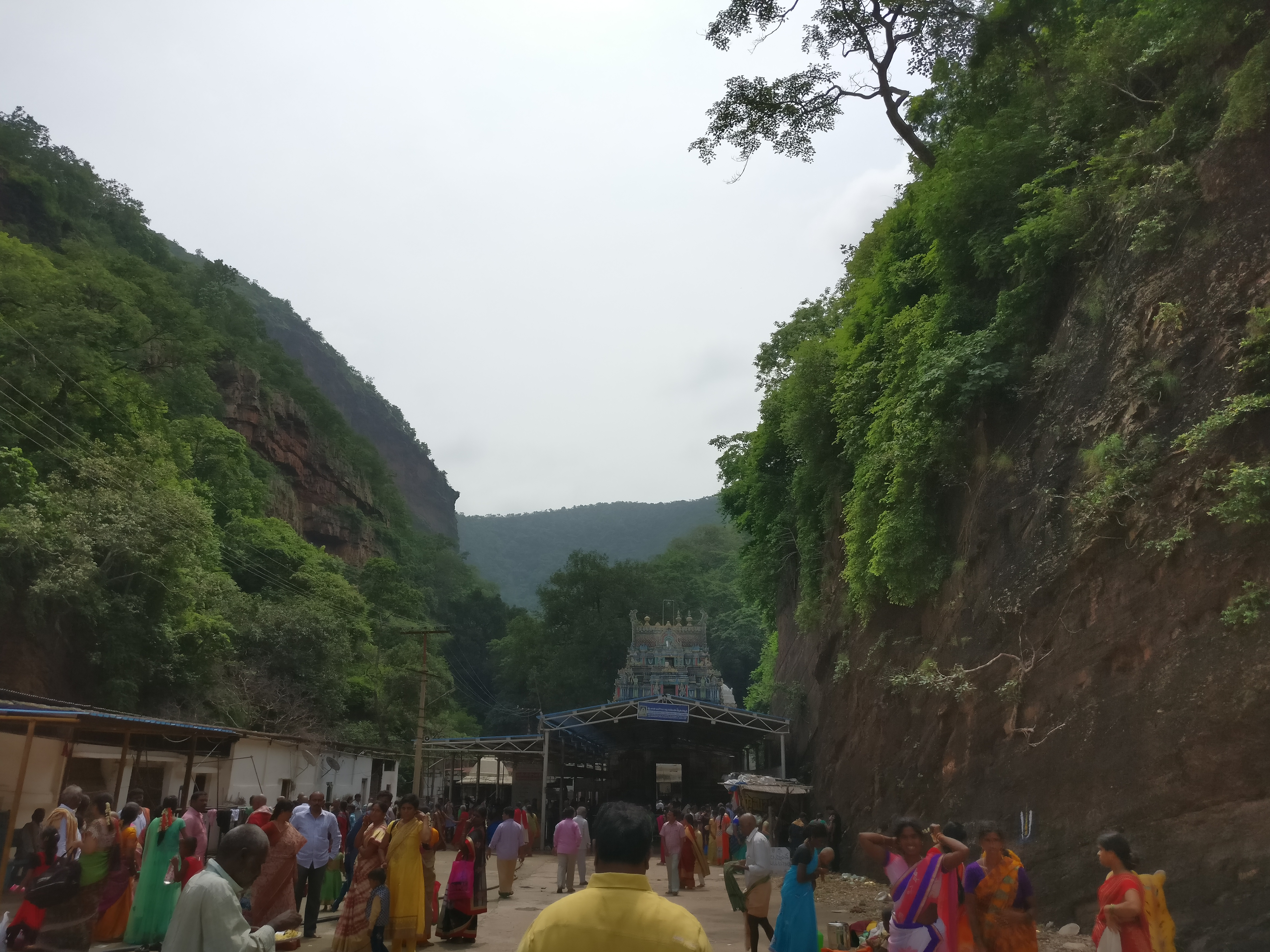
- Temple gopuram at Penna Ahobilam

- Location in Andhra Pradesh

Religion
- Affiliation: Hinduism
- District: Anantapur
- Deity: Lord Narasimha

Location
- Location: Penna Ahobilam
- State: Andhra Pradesh
- Country: India
- Coordinates: 14.8603°N 77.3065°E

Architecture
- Type: Vijayanagara style (regional variant)
- Completed: 15th century (major renovation)
- Elevation: 428 m (1,404 ft)

The Lakshmi Narasimha Swamy Temple' in Penna Ahobilam (often also spelled “Pennahobilam”) is a Hindu temple dedicated to Lord Narasimha, located in the Uravakonda mandal, Anantapur district of Andhra Pradesh, India.

== Location ==
The Penna Ahobilam Temple is approximately 12 km from Uravakonda and about 36 km from Anantapur. The temple is built on a hill, at an elevation of about 2800 feet (853 m) above sea level, in the Vijayanagara architectural style. The complex lies near the Penna rivulet and is accessible from surrounding towns by road.

== Legend and history ==
Penna Ahobilam is considered one of the Swayambhu (self‑manifested) Narasimha kshetras in Andhra Pradesh. According to district records, the temple was built in the year 1478 of the Salivahana era by Sri Krishna Devarayala (Sadashivaraya) on a hill near Uravakonda. Legend narrates that the sage Uddālaka once performed penance on the hill; in the lower area of the hill was a village named Gollapally, where a cow used to give milk daily into a well, until one day it was found empty. The local belief is that Lord Narasimha then appeared and declared that He would take the cow. The name "Ahobilam" is believed to originate from the phrase *Aho Balam* (“What power!”), referring to the divine strength of the Lord.

The sanctum enshrines a footprint (or impression) of Lord Narasimha, measuring 5 feet 3 inches. In 1472 A.D., the Vijayanagara king Sadashivaraya is credited with installing a large idol and expanding the temple. A subterranean tunnel beneath the sanctum is believed to channel the *theertham* used in daily *abhisheka* to flow into the Penna river, leaving no water in the tank at the temple. On the temple walls, inscriptions refer to rulers such as the Chalukya king Kirtivarman II, suggesting that parts of the site may date to earlier periods (8th to 16th centuries). A feature known as Narasimha Bugga (a fissure under tree roots) is associated with lore that water emanates from it, connected to the moment of the divine battle.

== Temple features ==
The main shrine houses the deity Sri Lakshmi Narasimha. Adjacent is a shrine for Udbhava Mahalakshmi, believed to have sprung from rock. About 2 km downhill lies Rakthakundam, a pond where it is believed Lord Narasimha washed his hands after slaying the demon. The temple exhibits architectural elements consistent with the Vijayanagara style, including gopurams, mandapas, and subsidiary shrines.

== Rituals, timings and festivals ==
=== Timings ===
- Morning darshan: 6:00 am to 1:00 pm - Afternoon/evening: 2:00 pm to 7:00 pm These timings are generally followed, though in local sources alternate timing windows are mentioned.

=== Festivals and events ===
The annual car festival (Rātham) is held in the month of April, drawing many devotees. The temple is also a popular venue for marriage rituals, as devotees believe blessings here support marital wellbeing.

== Significance and visitors ==
Penna Ahobilam is one of the prominent Narasimha kshetras in Andhra Pradesh, complementing the more famous Ahobilam in Kurnool district. Visitors often combine pilgrimage with exploring nearby natural features (streams, falls) especially during monsoon or post‑monsoon when water flows are stronger.

== Gallery ==
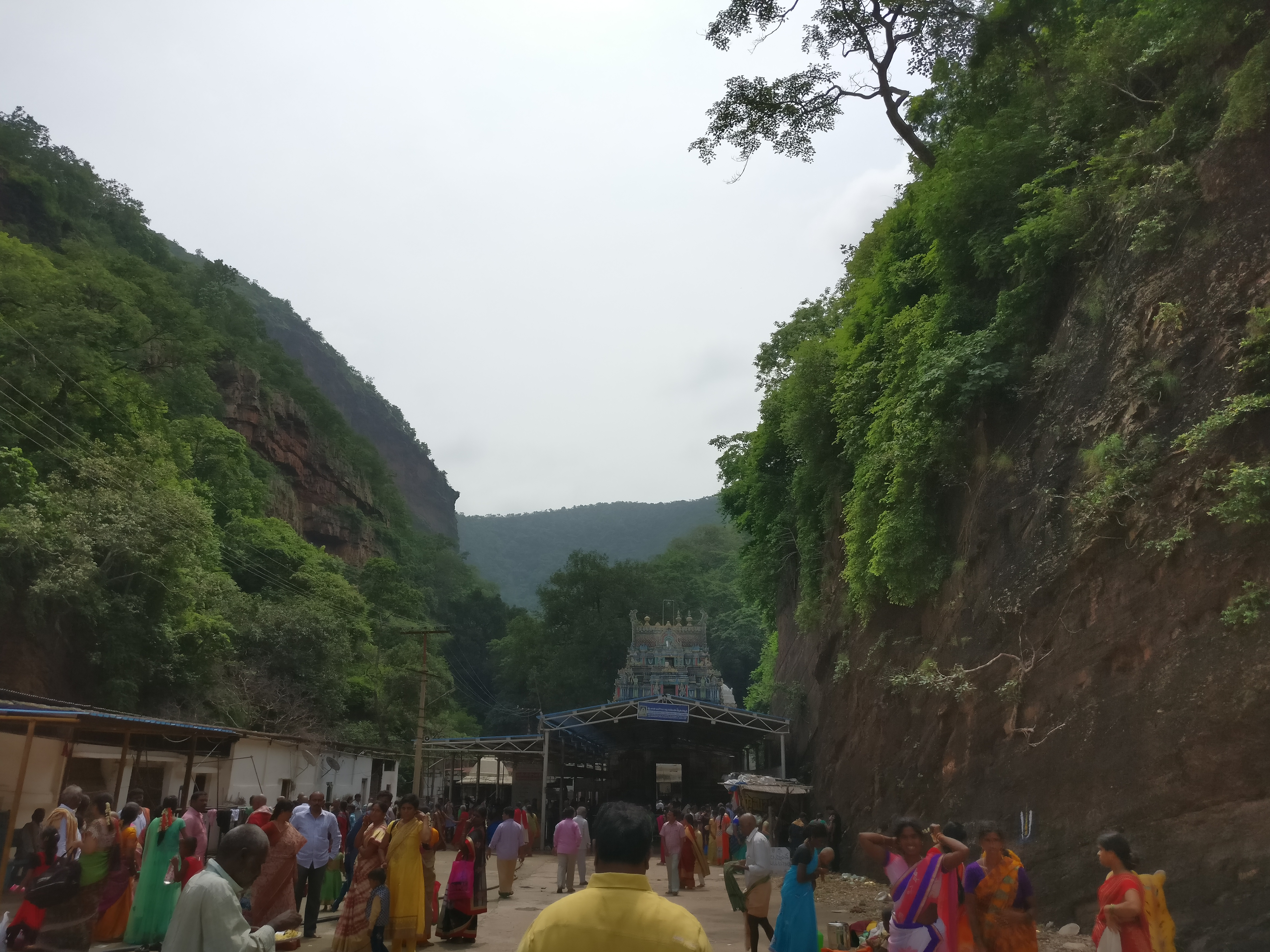
Temple at hilltop

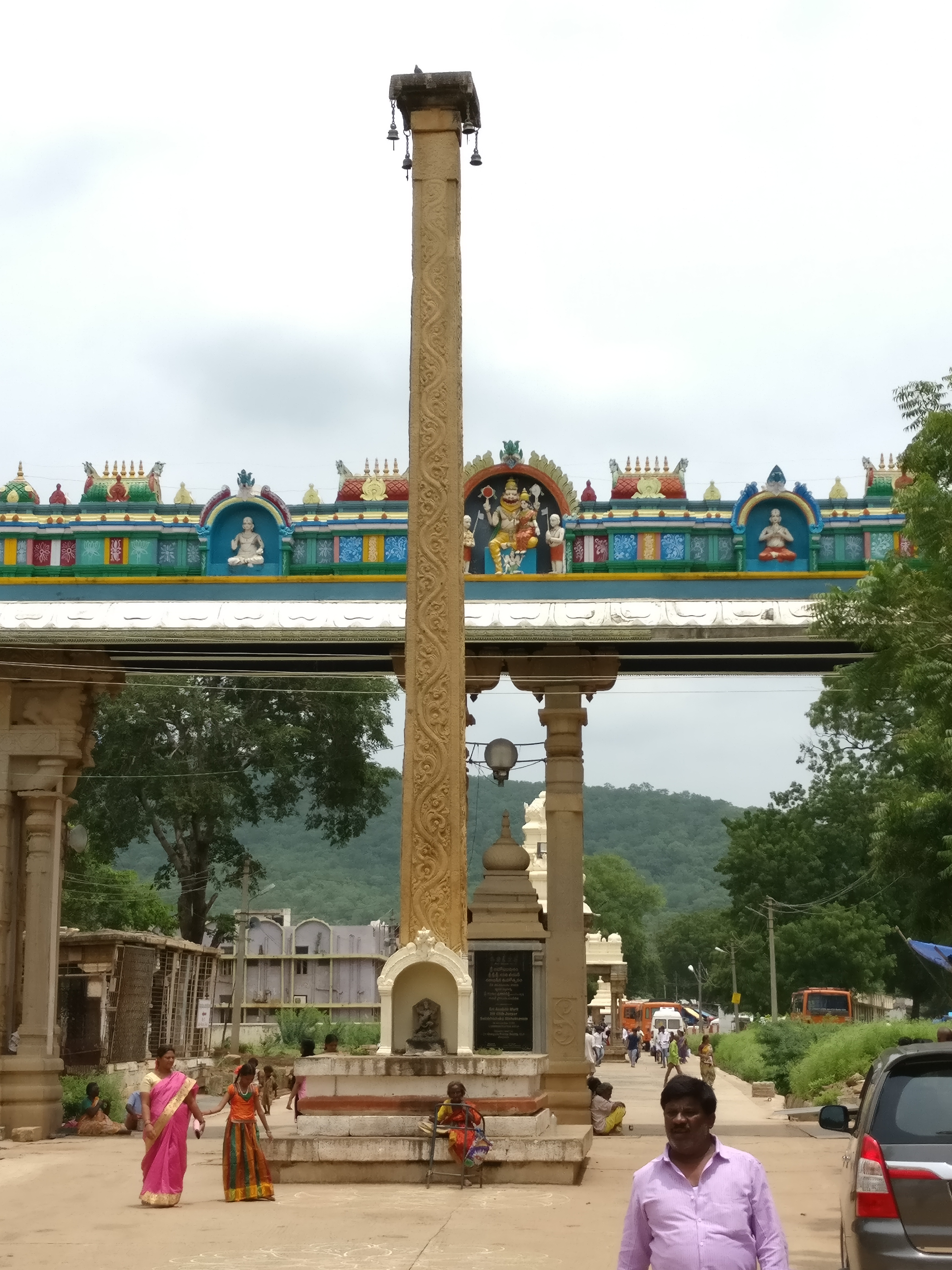
Entrance

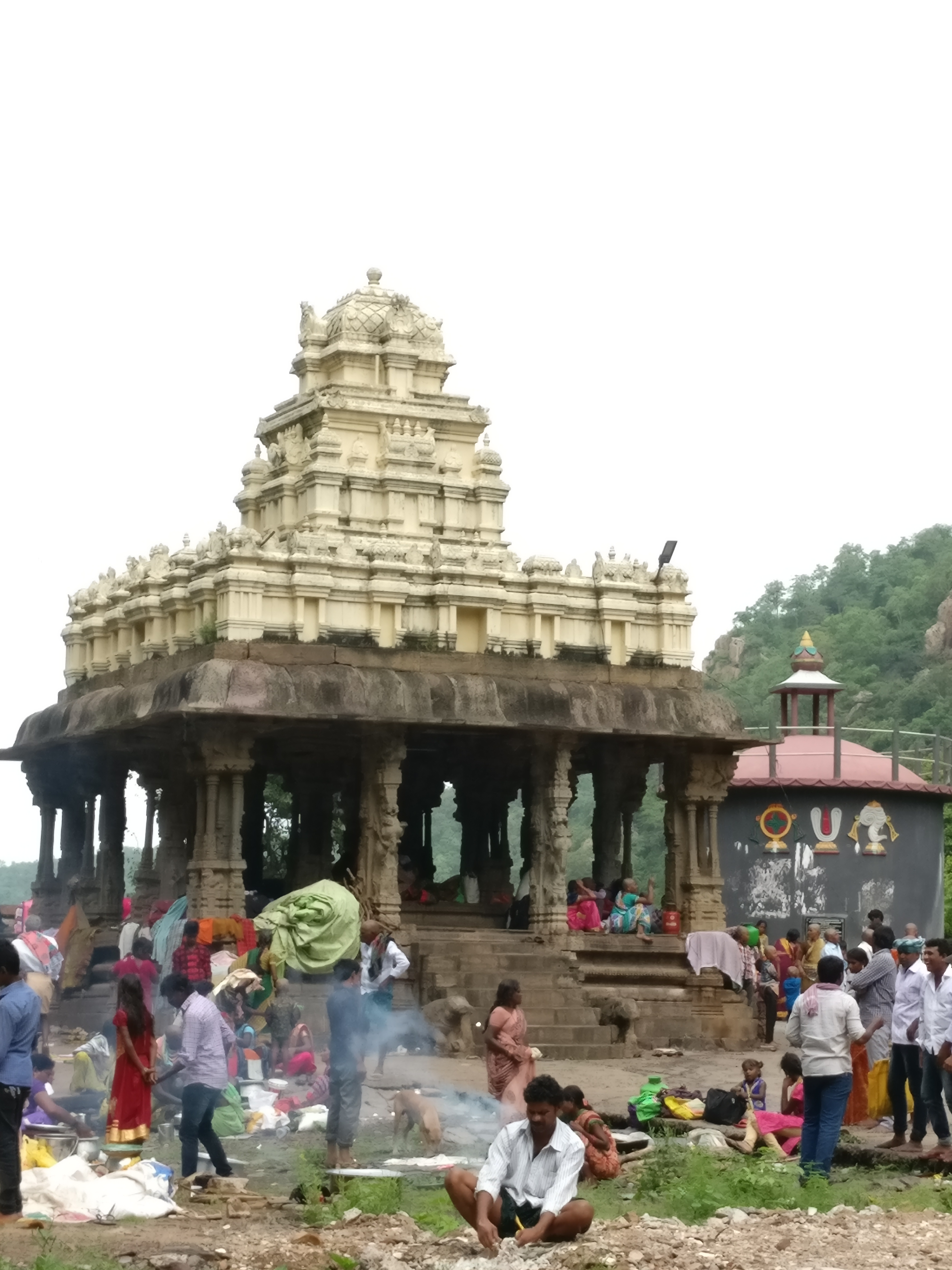
Mandapa on hill

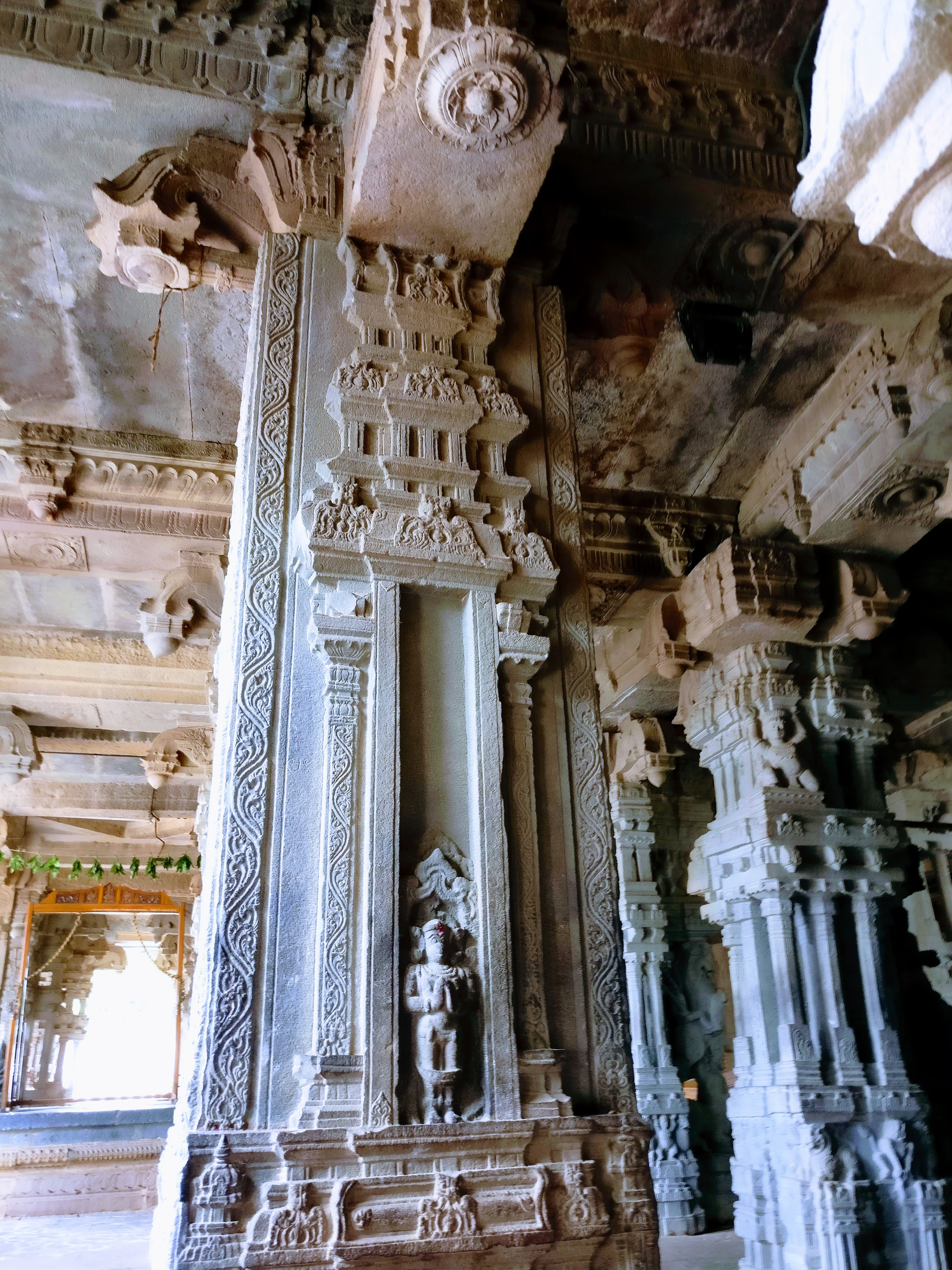
Pillar at lower part

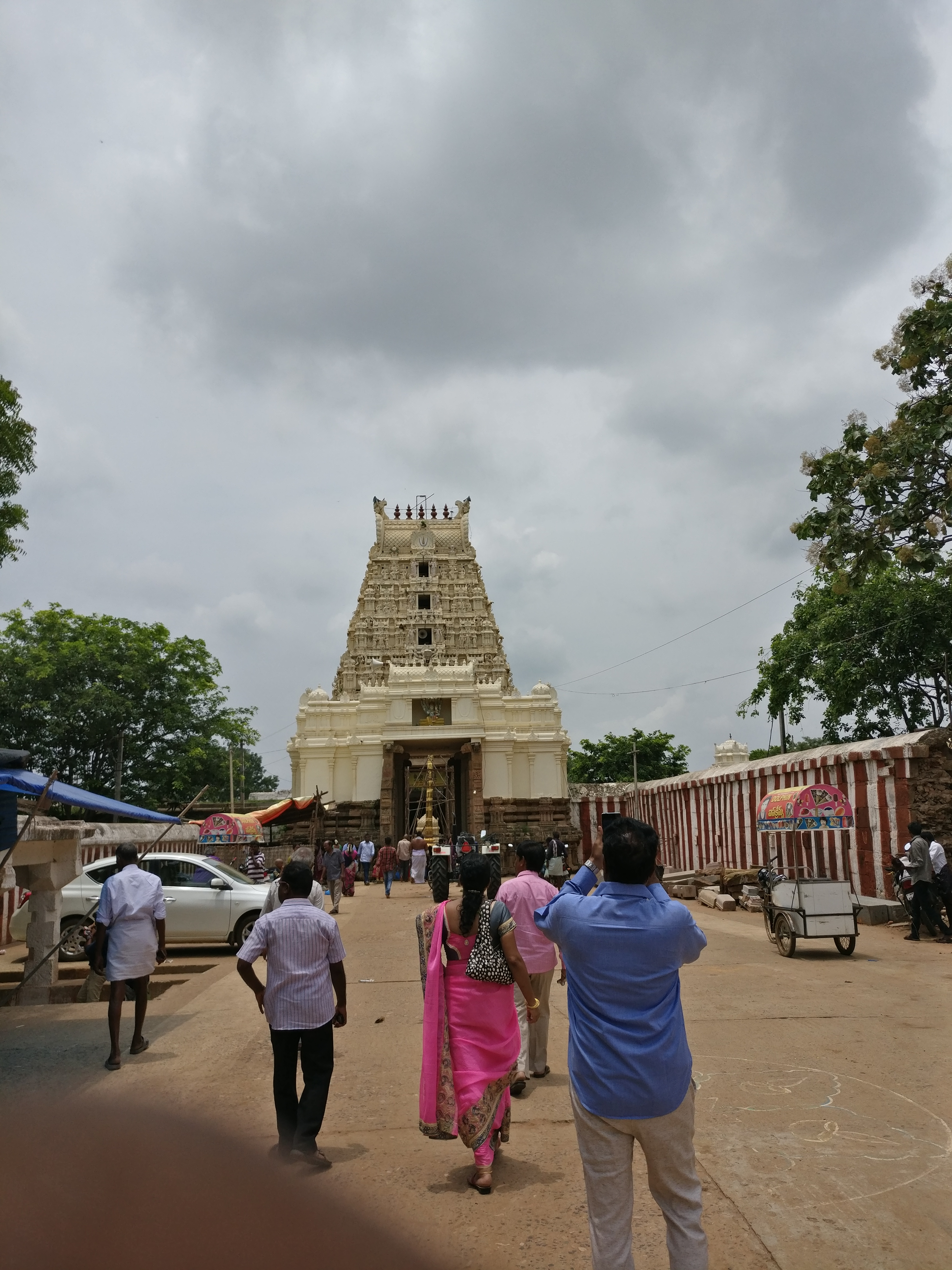
Lower hill view

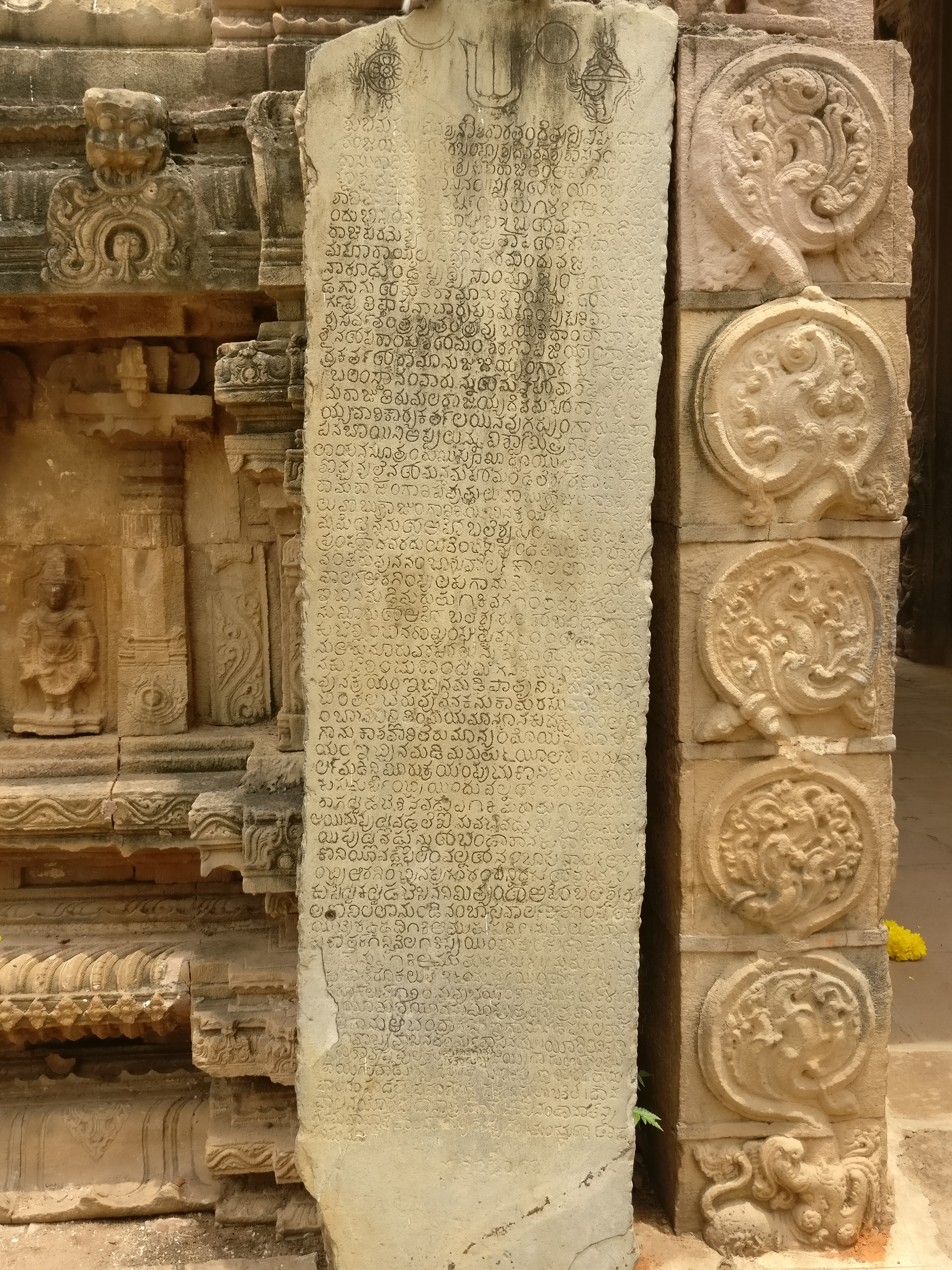
Inscription
