= Lakshmi Narasimha Temple, Bhadravati =

Hindu temple in Karnataka, India

Lakshminarasimha temple, Bhadravathi
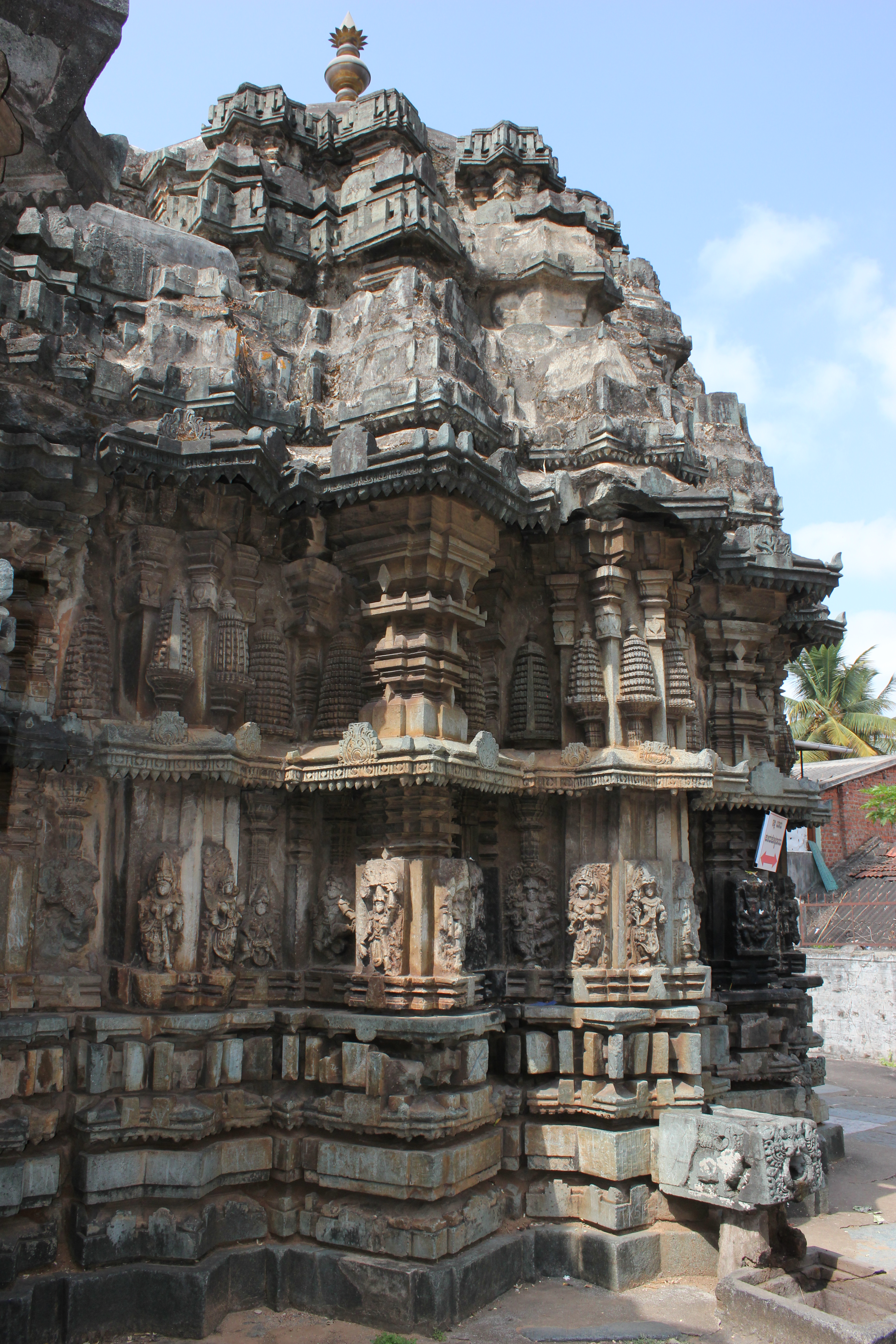

- Location within India Location within Karnataka

Religion
- Affiliation: Hinduism
- District: Shivamogga District
- Deity: Vishnu, Lakshmi Narasimha

Location
- Location: Bhadravati
- State: Karnataka
- Country: India
- Coordinates: 13°50′54.7″N 75°42′01.3″E

Architecture
- Completed: c. 1250 CE

Lakshmi Narasimha Temple, also referred to as Lakshminarasimha temple of Bhadravati, is a 13th-century Hindu temple dedicated to Vishnu, built by the Hoysala ruler Vira Someshwara. (Note: This should not be confused with numerous other Lakshmi Narasimha temples in India.) It is located in Bhadravati, Shimoga District of Karnataka state, India. The temple opens to the east and has three sanctums, one each dedicated to Venogopala, Lakshminarasimha and Vishnu-Puroshottama. It is notable for its Vesara architecture, with artwork that includes legends and deities of Vaishnavism, as well as those of Shaivism, Shaktism and Vedic deities. Important reliefs include those of Ganesha, Dakshinamurti, Bhairava, Sarasvati, Brahma, Surya, Harihara (half Shiva, half Vishnu), and others. The temple's original shikaras were ruined, and have been restored with a conical structure. According to Adam Hardy – a scholar of Indian temple architecture, this temple has two "exceptional" stellate structures highlighting the architectural sophistication of the Hoysalas.

The monument is protected by the Karnataka state division of Archaeological Survey of India.

== Location ==
Bhadravati is a historic city and in the contemporary era, it is a steel producing center in west-central Karnataka. It is about 20 kilometres (12 mi) southeast from Shimoga (Shivamogga, NH 69), and about 255 kilometres (158 mi) northwest from the state capital Bengaluru (Bangalore). The Lakshminarasimha temple is located to the north of the town and the east bank of the Bhadra river.

== Architecture ==
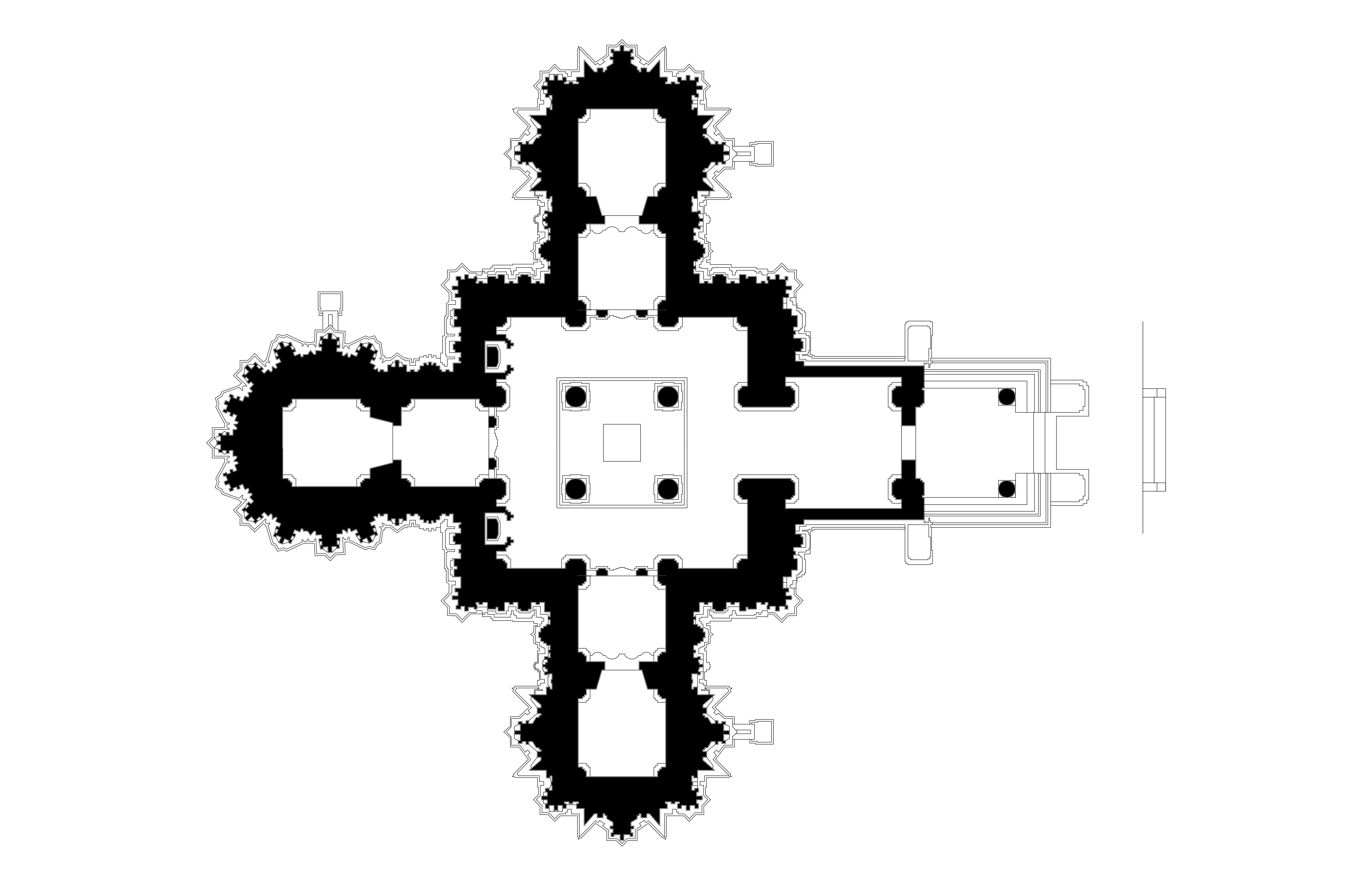
The floor plan of the Lakshminarasimha temple, Bhadravati

The temple illustrates a complex trikuta (three sanctum) temple built from soapstone, with a square plan and Vesara vimana. It stands on a jagati and the outer wall exhibits a two tier decorative plan. The jagati extends around the temple and serves the purpose of pradakshinapatha (circumambulation).

The entrance to the temple is through an open pillared hall or porch (mukhamantapa) followed by a closed hall (mantapa or navaranga). The porch consists of an awning supported by lathe turned half pillars and parapets on either side. The inner wall of the shrine is square and plain where as the outer wall is stellate (star shaped) with numerous recesses and projections that are used for decorative relief. These include a large number of Vaishnava legends and images, but also include a significant number of legends and images from Shaivism, Shaktism and of Vedic deities. Examples include exquisite artwork of Ganesha, Chandika, Bhairava, Harihara, Dakshinamurti, Nataraja with khatvanga, dancing Durga, Durga Mahisasuramardini, Rati and Kamadeva, Saraswati, Brahma, multiple panels of Surya, and others. The Surya image signed by shilpin Maba is particularly notable.

The closed central hall connects to the three sanctum via a vestibule (called sukhanasi). The vestibule also as a tower (also called sukhanasi) which looks like a low protrusion of the main tower over the shrine. The outer wall of the vestibule is decorative but inconspicuous because it appears like a short continuation of the shrine outer wall.

With regards to outer wall decoration, what Hardy calls "two tier", the art historian Gerard Foekema designates as the "old style" with two sets of eves: one eaves runs around the temple where the superstructure meets the outer wall of the shrines, below which are miniature decorative towers on pilasters (called aedicula). Below this is a second eves followed by a panel of Hindu deities in relief and finally a set of moldings at the base. The design of the tower, according to art historian Percy Brown, is a characteristic feature to the Hoysala art. According to Brown, the stellate form of the base of the shrine with its projections and recesses is carried through the tower giving it a "fluted effect". The tower is divided into tiers with each tier diminishing in height and culminating in an umbrella like structure.

The ceiling of the closed hall is supported by lathe turned pillars. Brown states that these lathe turned pillars with four brackets above are a signature style of the 11th-13th century Chalukya-Hoysala architectural idiom.

== Gallery ==
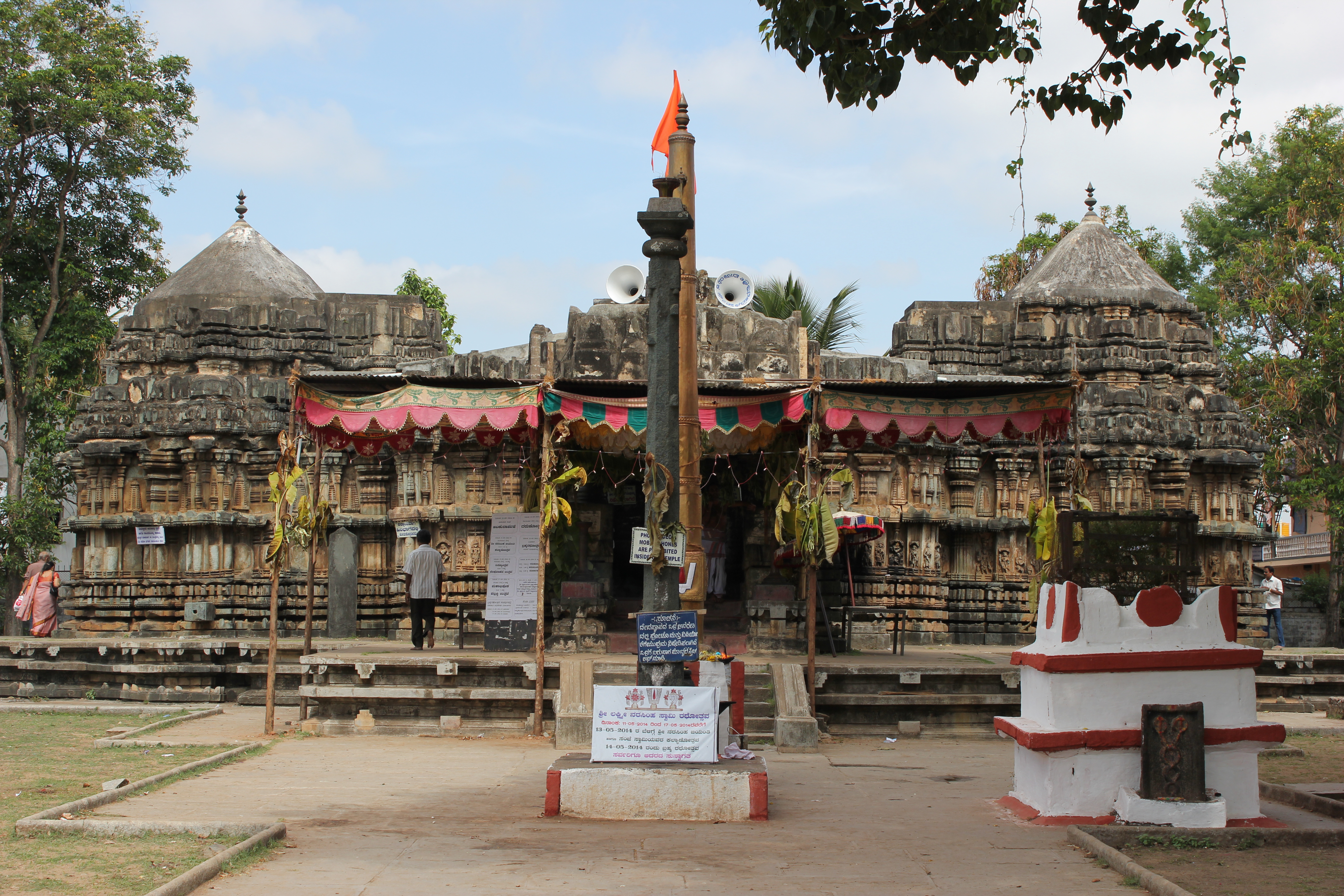
Entrance with stambha

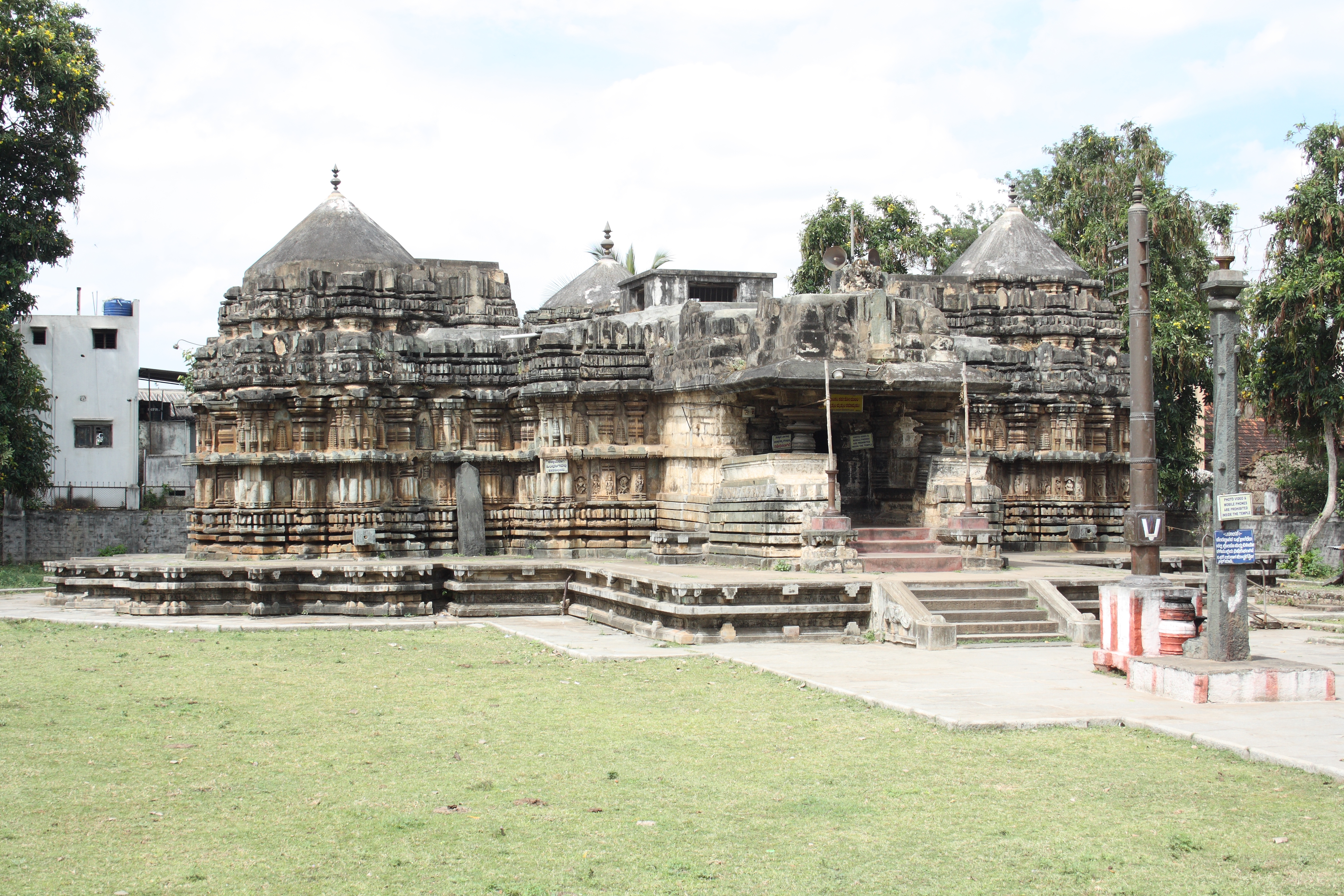
Lakshmi Narasimha Temple in Bhadravati

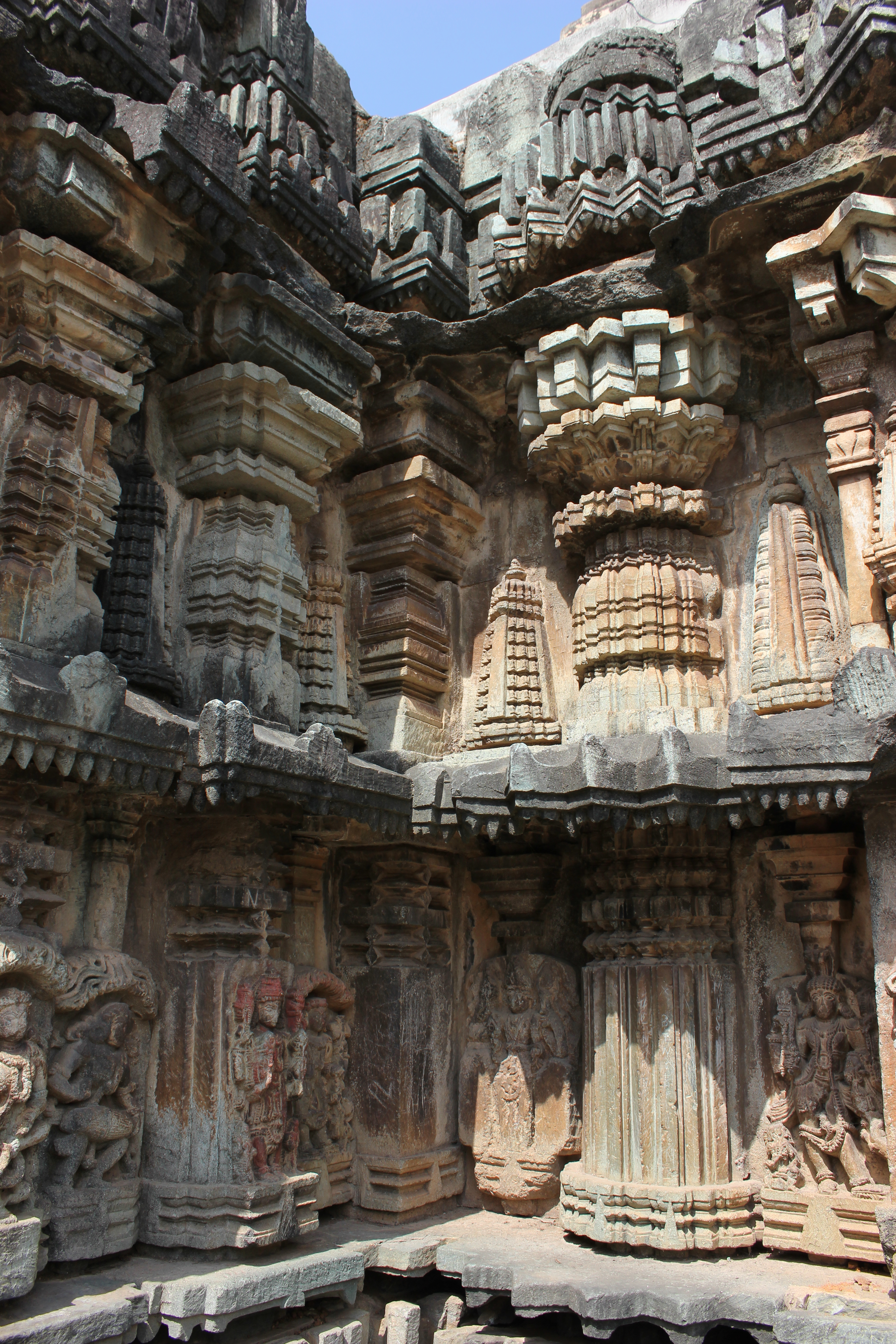
Reliefs, pilasters and aedicules on the temple

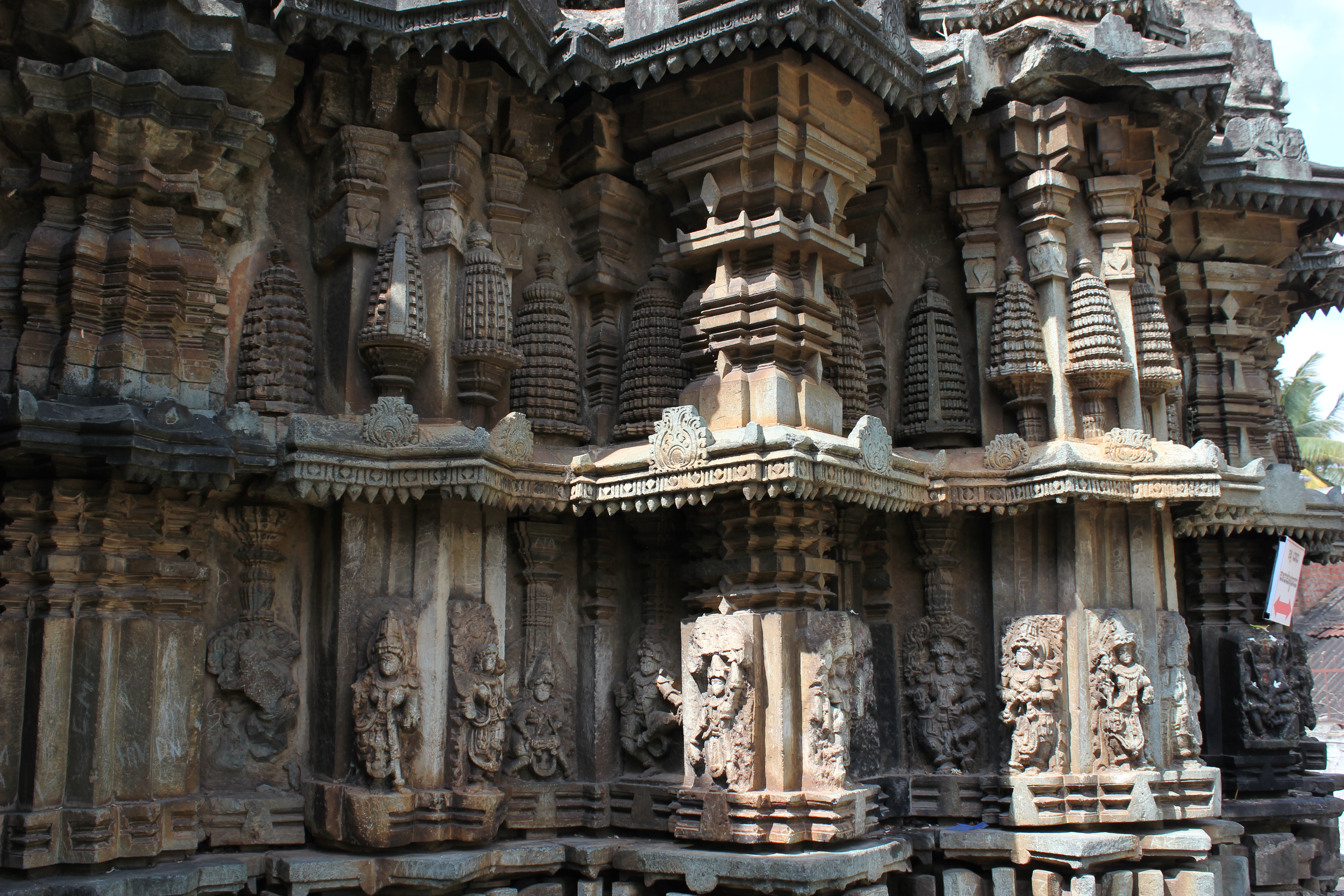
Hindu deities and decorative miniature towers (aedicules)
