= Lakshmi Narasimha =

Form of Hindu god Narasimha with consort Lakshmi

- God of Time; Goddess of Prosperity
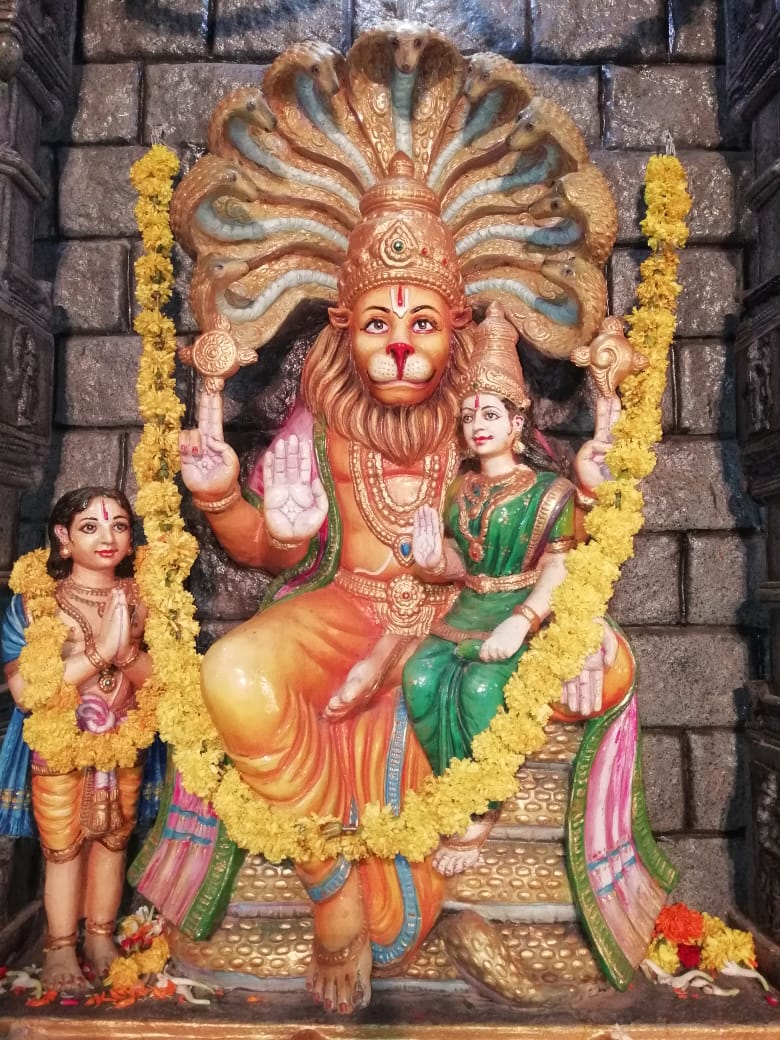
- Lakshmi Narasimha with Prahlada
- Venerated in: Vaishnavism
- Affiliation: Sri Vaishnavism
- Abode: Vaikuntha
- Festivals: Narasimha Jayanti

Lakshmi Narasimha (Sanskrit: लक्ष्मीनरसिंह, romanized: Lakṣmīnarasiṃha) is an iconographical depiction of Narasimha, the fourth avatar of Vishnu, with his consort Lakshmi, the goddess of prosperity. It is one of the five iconographical forms of Narasimha, among Jvala Narasimha, Gandaberunda Narasimha, Ugra Narasimha, and Yoga Narasimha.

== Legend ==
In an alternate iteration of the legend of Narasimha, after he slays Hiranyakashipu, his fury is still unabated. The deity is enraged that his virtuous devotee, Prahlada, had been subjected to the violent deeds of his own father. Despite the fact that the devas sing his praises and extol his glories, he remains unpacified. The devas proceed to pray to Lakshmi, who appears before her consort. She soothes Narasimha, assuring him that both his devotee and the world had been saved. Hearing his wife's words, the deity is pacified, and his appearance also becomes more benign.

“Seeing his own dear wife, Viṣṇu, the lord of all, gave up his anger due to the demon’s body, and in a moment became pleased. That ocean of pity, Viṣṇu, placing the goddess on his lap and embracing her, looked at the gods with eyes wet with the nectar of favour.” — Padma Purana, Chapter 6.238.129–133

As a result, Lakshmi Narasimha is venerated as a representation of gentleness and peace.

== Iconography ==
In this representation, Narasimha is depicted in his saumya (pleasing) form with his consort Lakshmi seated on his lap, contrasting with his ugra (terrifying) aspect. He carries his attributes of the Sudarshana Chakra and Panchajanya, and his murti is decorated with ornaments and garlands.

== Symbolism ==
In the Tiruppavai, the mythical motif of the lion is invoked in the representation of Lakshmi Narasimha. The deity is regarded to be magnanimous, the greatest of all beings (Purushottama), and his heart is symbolised by his consort, Lakshmi.

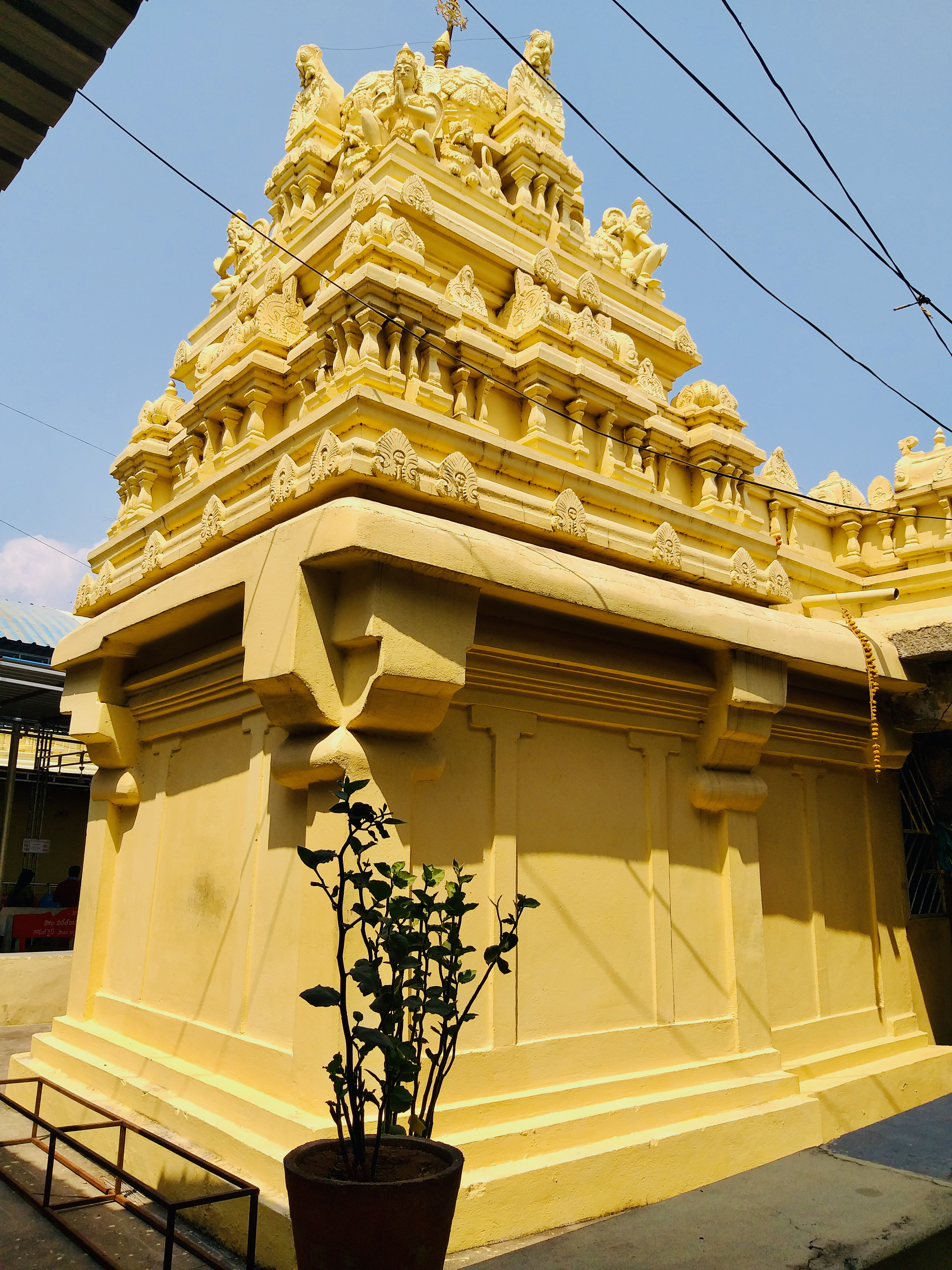
Lakshmi Narasimha temple, Dharmapuri

== Temples ==
- Lakshmi Narasimha Swamy Temple, Ahobilam (Lower Ahobilam)
- Bhu Varaha Narasimha Swamy Temple, Ahobilam
- Chenchu Lakshmi Sameta Shri Ahobila Narasimha Swamy Temple, Ahobilam
- Chenchu Lakshmi Sameta Shri Pavana Narasimha Swamy Temple, Ahobilam
- Maha Lakshmi Sameta Shri Malola Narasimha Swamy Temple, Ahobilam
- Lakshmi Narasimha temple, Antarvedi
- Lakshmi Narasimha temple, Dharmapuri
- Lakshmi Narasimha temple, Yadadri
- Lakshmi Narasimha temple, Mangalagiri
- Lakshminarasimha temple, Javagal
- Lakshmi Narasimha temple, Bhadravati
- Lakshminarasimha temple, Haranhalli
- Lakshminarasimha temple, Vignasante
- Lakshmi Narasimhar temple, Narasinghapuram
- Lakshminarasimha temple, Nuggehalli
- Lakshmi Narasimha Swamy Temple, Kadiri

== Gallery ==
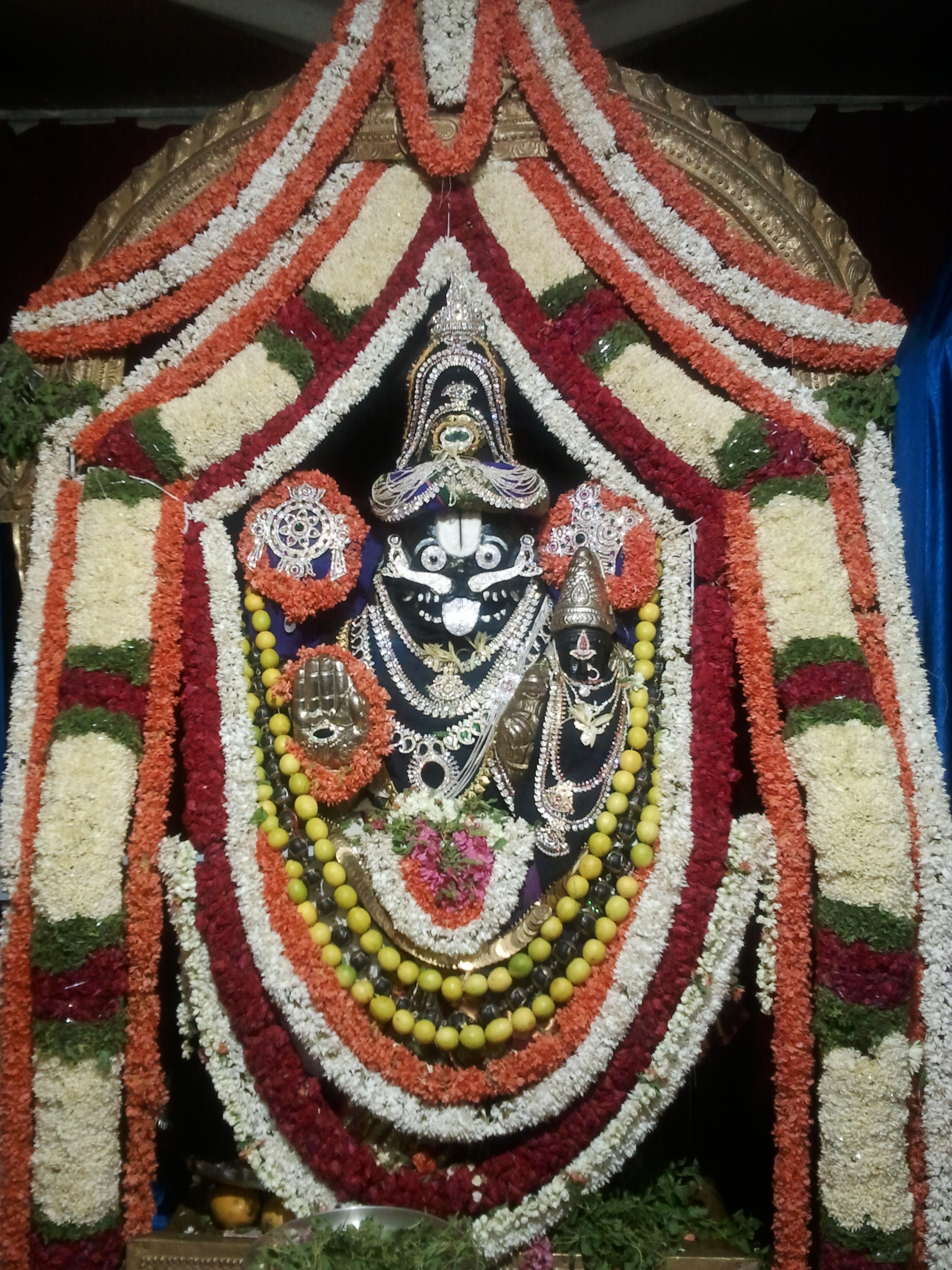
Lakshmi Narasimha, Bangalore

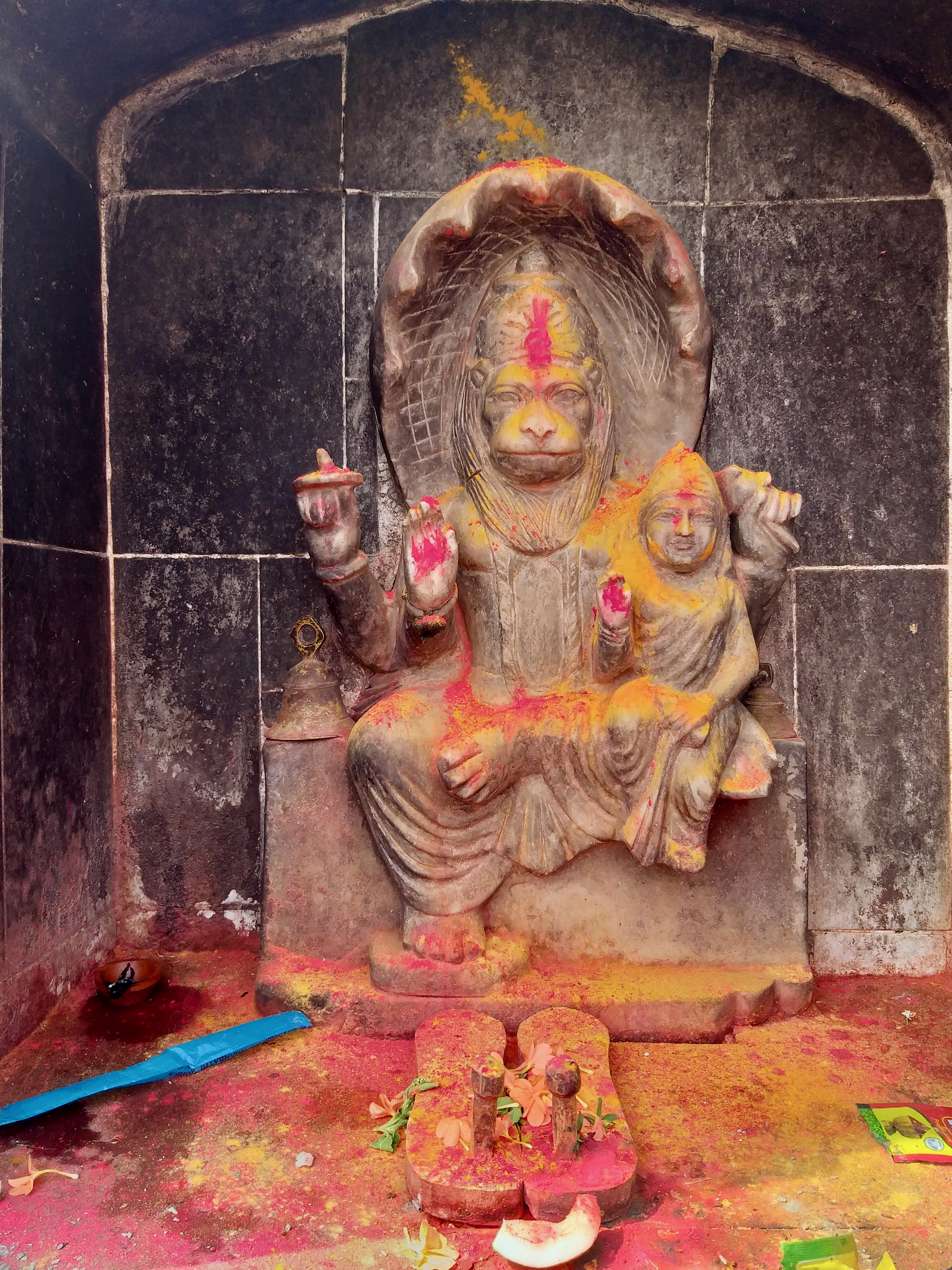
Lakshmi Narasimha, Bejjanki, Telangana

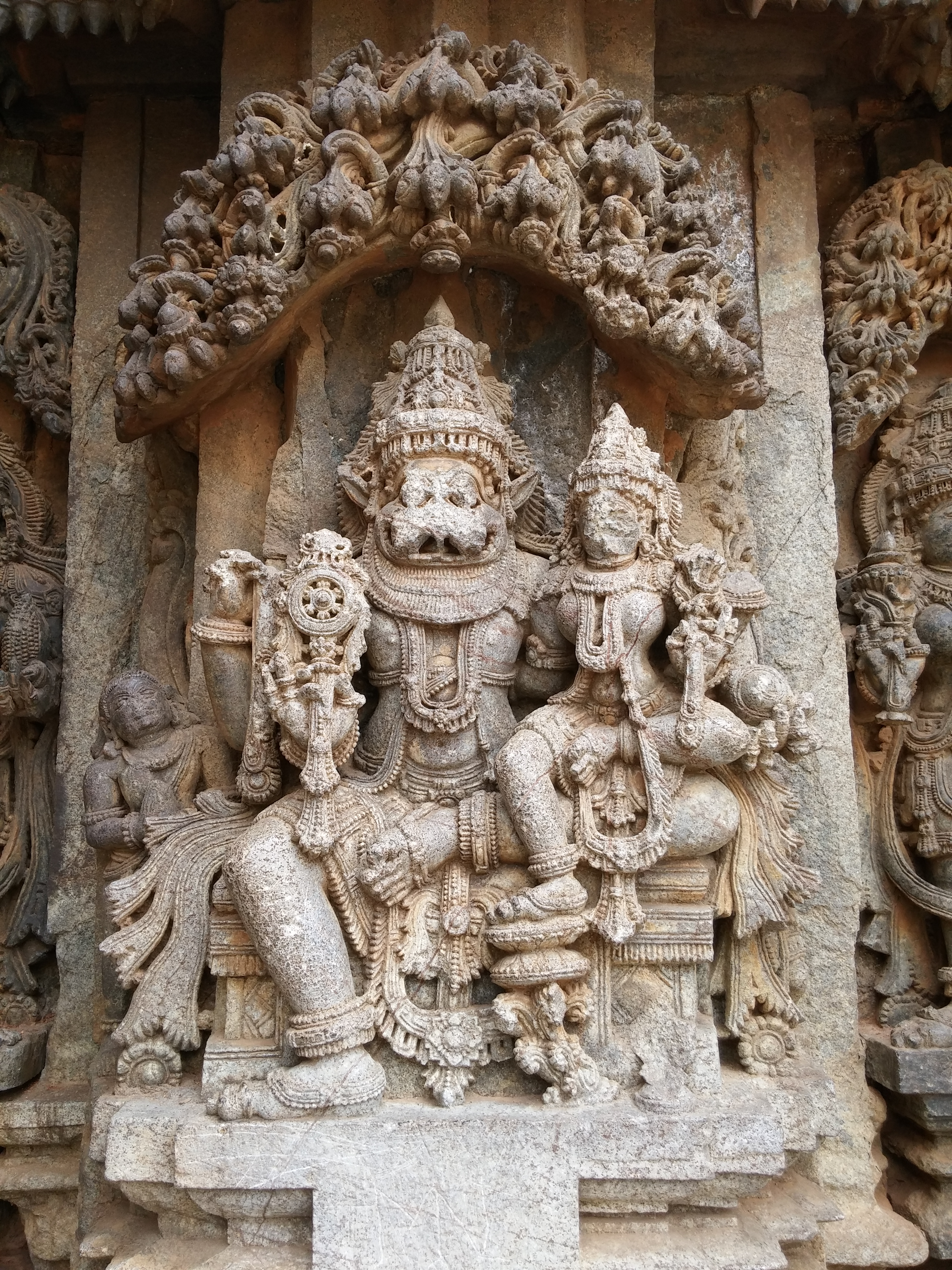
Sculpture of Lakshmi Narasimha

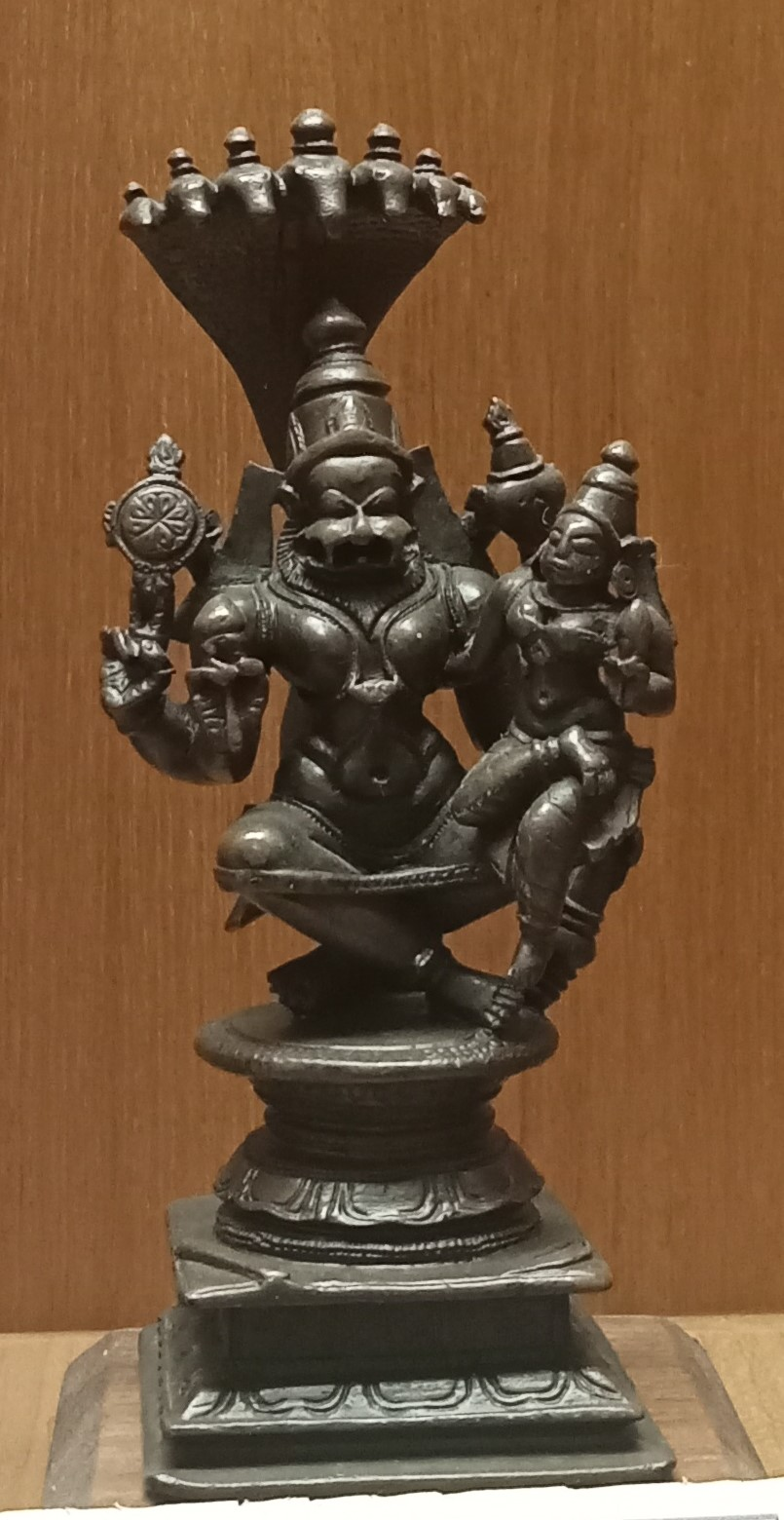
16th century Vijayanagara depiction

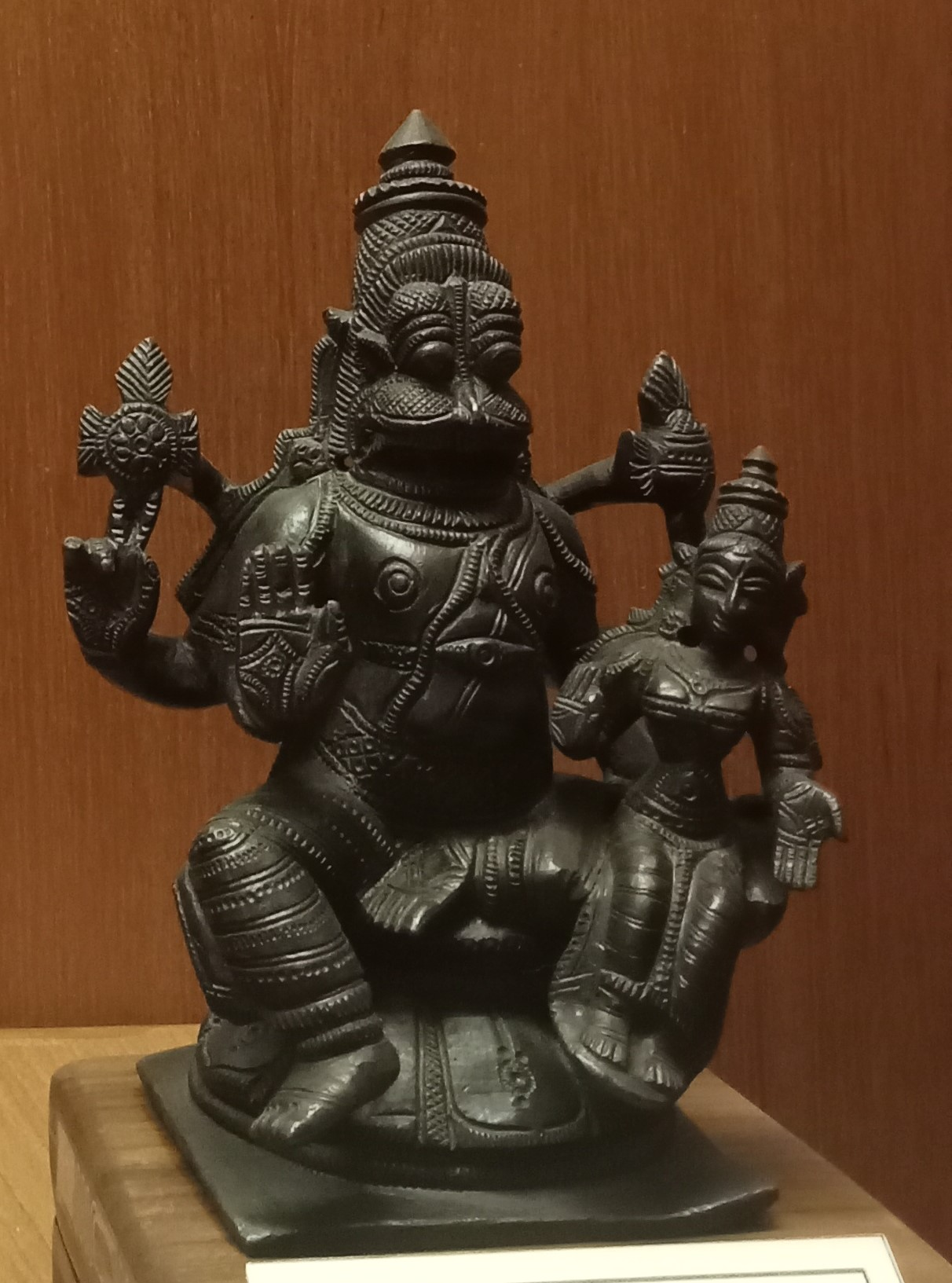
Statue of Lakshmi Narsimha cast in bronze

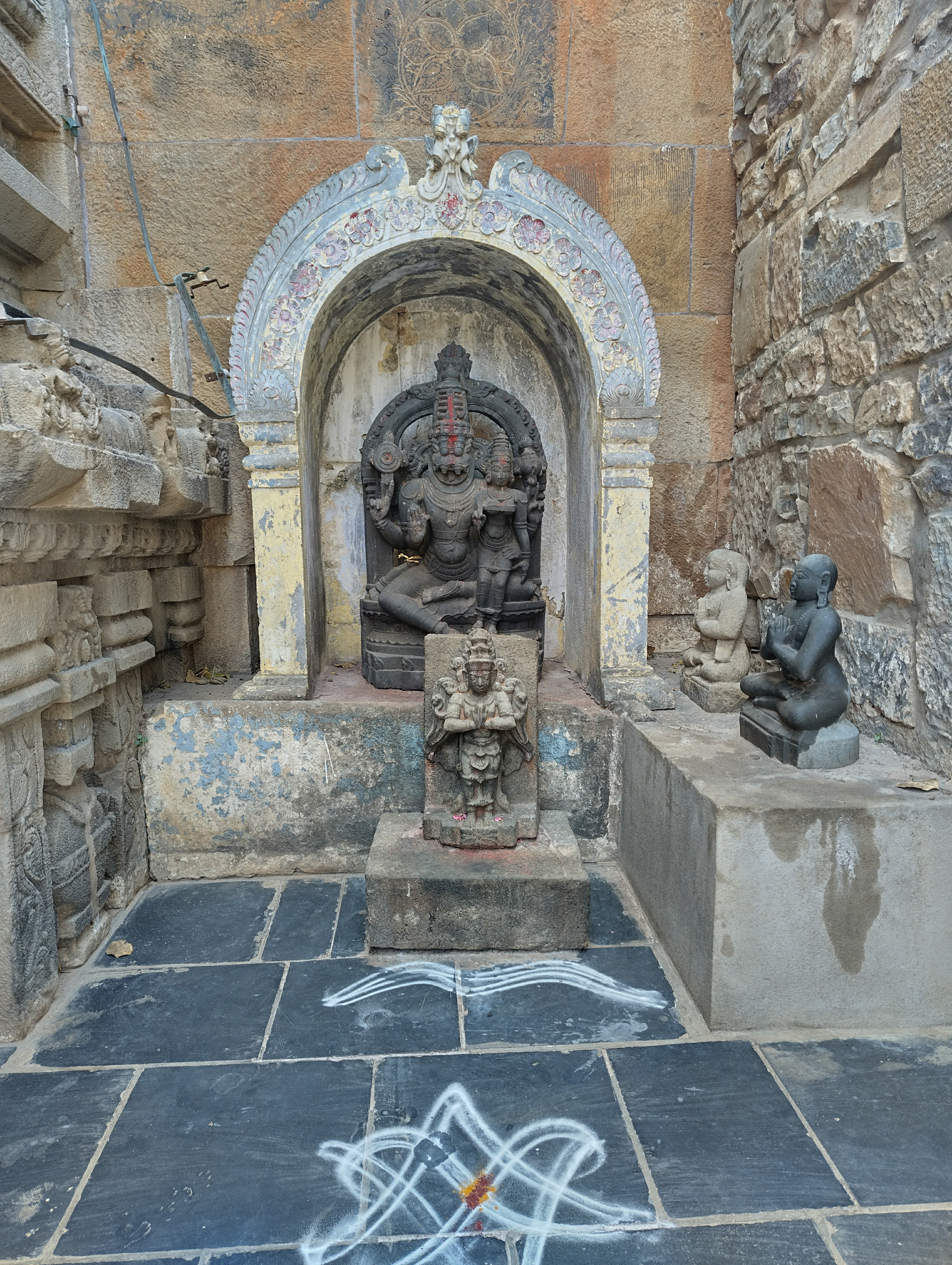
Sculpture of Lakshmi Narasimha in Ahobilam, Andhra Pradesh
