= Lakshminarasimha Temple, Vignasante =

Lakshminarasimha temple at Vignasante
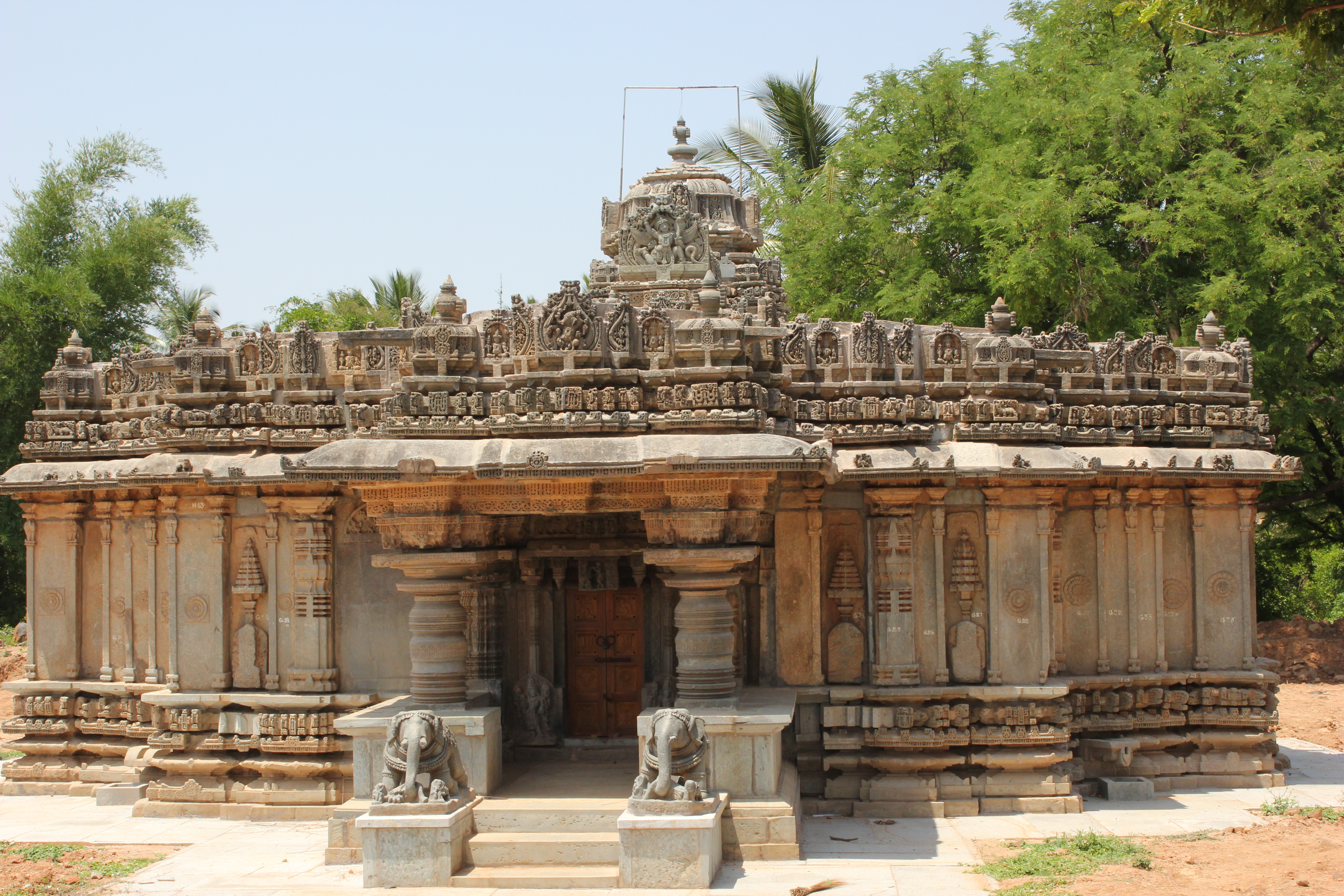

- Location within India

Religion
- Affiliation: Hinduism
- District: Tumkur District
- Deity: Vishnu

Location
- Location: Vighnasante
- State: Karnataka
- Country: India
- Coordinates: 13°08′48.7″N 76°32′23.3″E

Architecture
- Type: Hoysala
- Creator: Appayya, Gopala and Madhava (brothers)
- Completed: c. 1286 CE

The Lakshminarasimha temple at Vignasante is a 13th-century Vishnu temple in the village of Vignasante, Tumkur district, Karnataka, India. The three-shrine temple is dedicated to Venugopala, Narasimha and Lakshmi Narayana. One of the late temples built before Hoysala empire came under sustained attacks from the Delhi Sultanate, it illustrates the mature Hoysalanadu architectural tradition. The fully carved, three storey Vesara vimana of this temple is notable.

The monument is protected by the Karnataka state division of the Archaeological Survey of India.

== Location and date ==
Vighnasante is about 65 kilometres (40 mi) east-northeast of Hassan city, and 140 kilometres (87 mi) west of Bengaluru, the capital of Karnataka. It is connected to India's national highway network with NH 75.

The inscriptions here name the location as "Igganasante" (now Vignasante). The temple was built in 1286 CE, by three brothers named Appayya, Gopala and Madhava, during the rule of the Hoysala king Narasimha III.

== Architecture ==
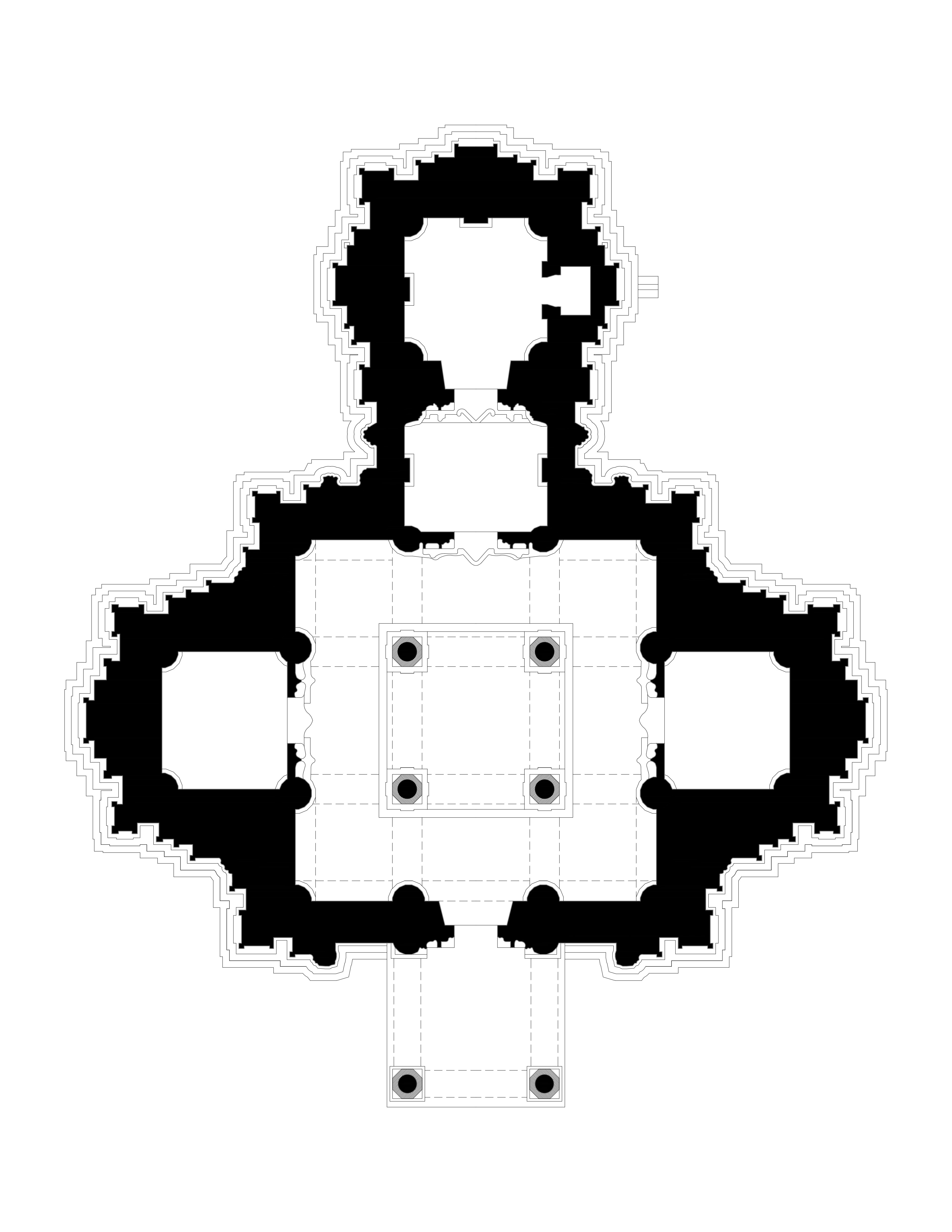
Floor plan of the temple

This three shrined (trikuta) temple was built using Soap stone, and it illustrates the classic Hoysala architectural idiom. Although it has three sanctums, only the central shrine has a tower (called shikhara) over it. The eastern sanctum is dedicated to Venugopala (Krishna with flute), western to a seated Lakshmi Narayana (Vishnu with Lakshmi), while the southern central sanctum has Narasimha (man-lion avatar of Vishnu).

The entrance of this square-plan temple faces north. This entrance is through an open pillared hall or porch (mukhamantapa) followed by a closed hall (navaranga mantapa). The porch consists of an awning supported by lathe turned half pillars and parapets on either side. The ceiling of the closed hall is supported by four lathe turned pillars. The navaranga mantapa leads to the central sanctum via a vestibule. Other sanctums do not have a vestibule, are connected directly to the closed hall. The nave inside and also the outside open mantapa has srikara-style pillars, all highly decorated with stone ornamentation so fine that it is of the "silver jewelry genre", according to Madhusudan Dhaky.

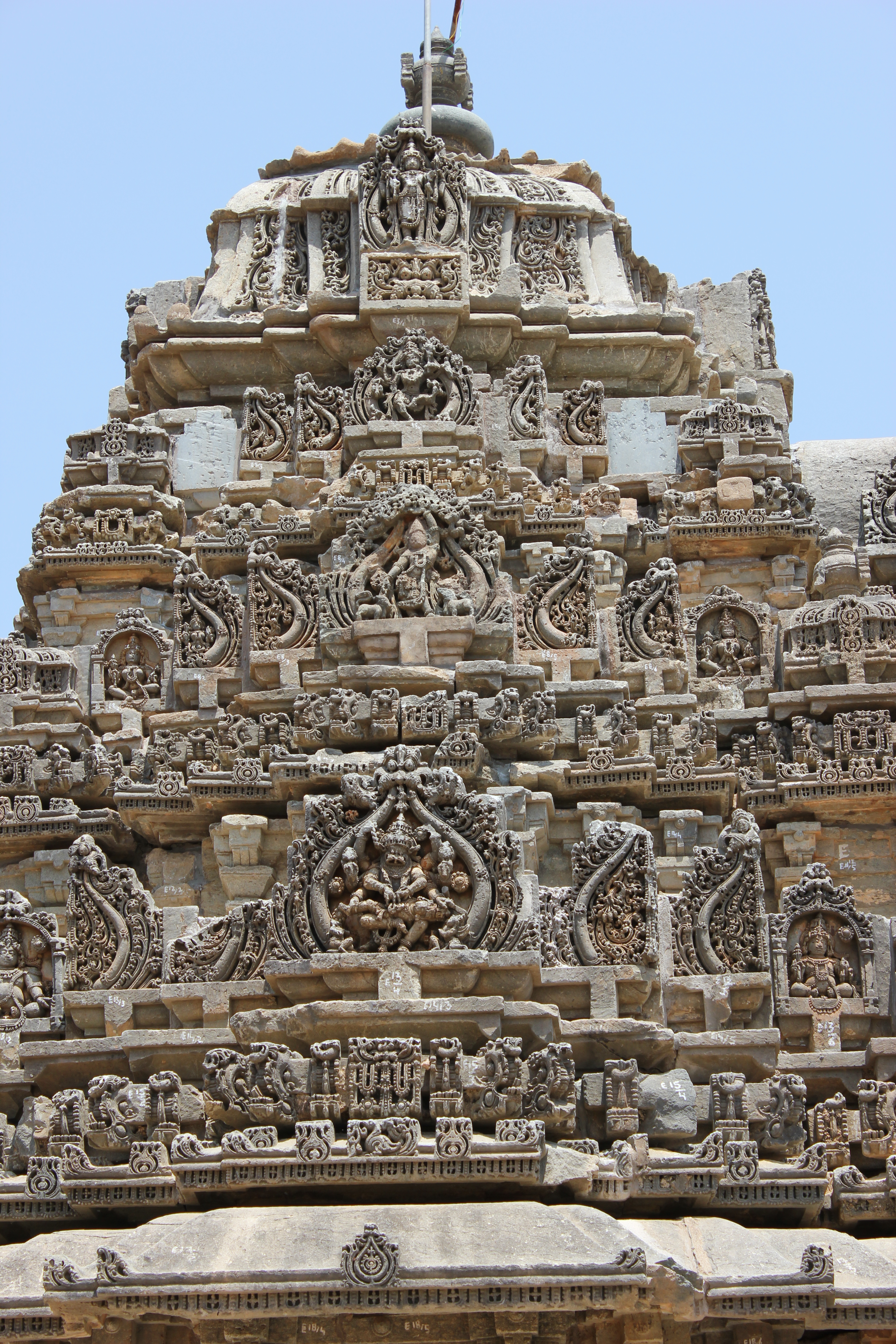
Ornate shikhara (tower) over shrine in Lakshminarasimha temple at Vignasante

The mantapa of the shrine, as well as the three sanctums, are square. The outer shape of each Vesara vimana is stellate (star shaped) with rotated squares. This architecture creates numerous recesses and projections that are used for decorative relief. Above the central sanctum's vestibule, on the outside, is a projection called sukhanasi, which looks like a low protrusion of the main tower over the shrine. This sukhanasi is highly decorated with carvings with a Garuda in the mahanasi (fronton). The other two sanctum's outside has "beautifully carved tiara" and "exceedingly elegant mundamala", states Dhaky.

The sanctum doorframes and pilasters from porch onwards are profusely carved. The vimana of each sanctum has a dvi-anga (two section) plan, with carved lotus enlivening the karna and subhadra. At the top of the temple superstructure tower is the kalasha, a decorative water-pot like structure that is placed over a large ornate dome. This dome is the largest piece of sculpture in the temple measuring up to 2m x 2m.

The design of the tower, according to art historian Percy Brown, is a characteristic feature to the Hoysala art. According to Brown, the stellate form of the base of the shrine with its projections and recesses is carried through the tower giving it a "fluted effect". The tower is divided into tiers with each tier diminishing in height and culminating in an umbrella like structure. According to Brown, the lathe turned pillars with four brackets above are a signature style of the 11th-13th century Chalukya-Hoysala architectural idiom.

The decor on the parapet outer wall, the domical ceiling, the lintel over the entrance and the pillars shows the good taste of the Hoysala artisans.

== Gallery ==
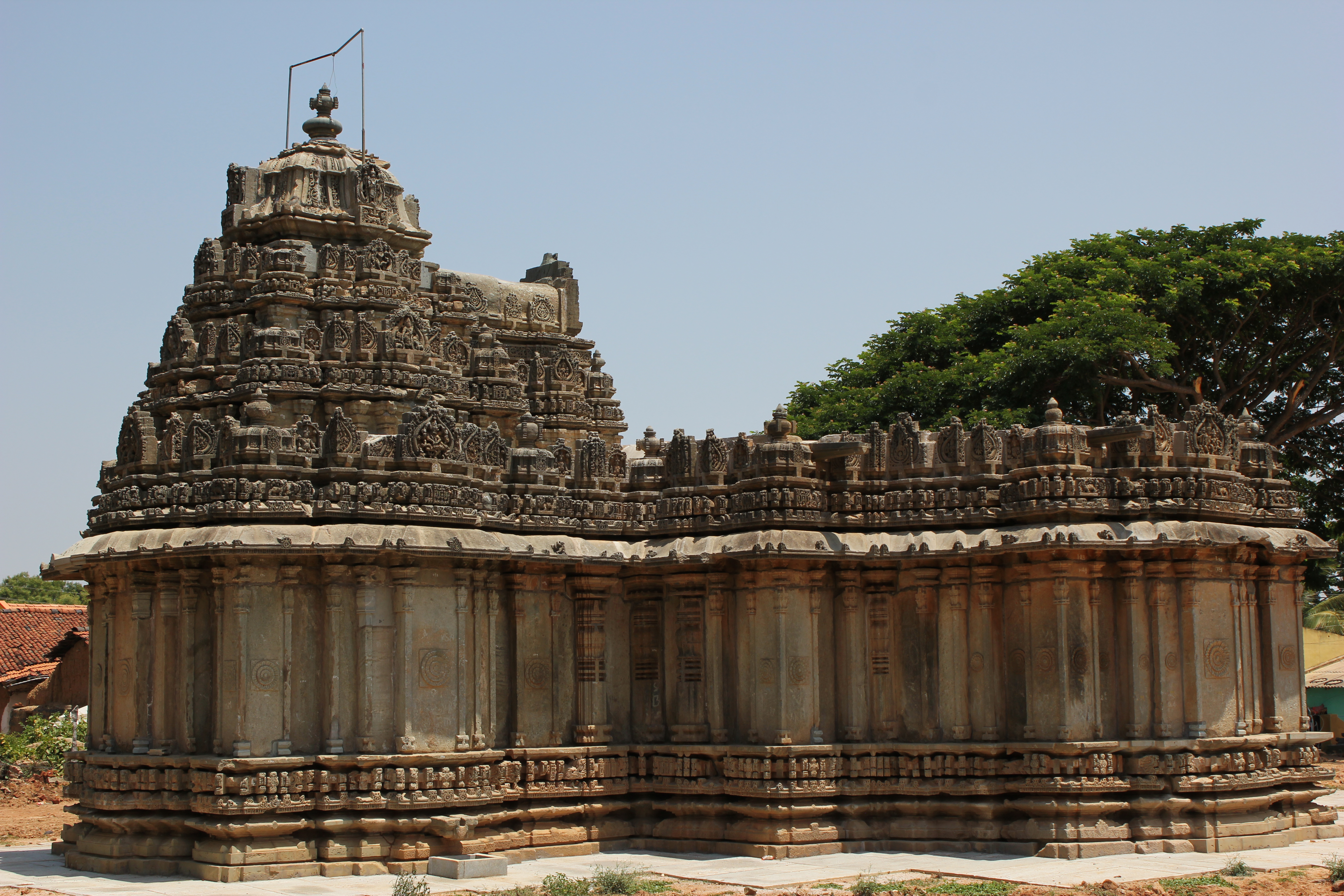
Overview of the temple

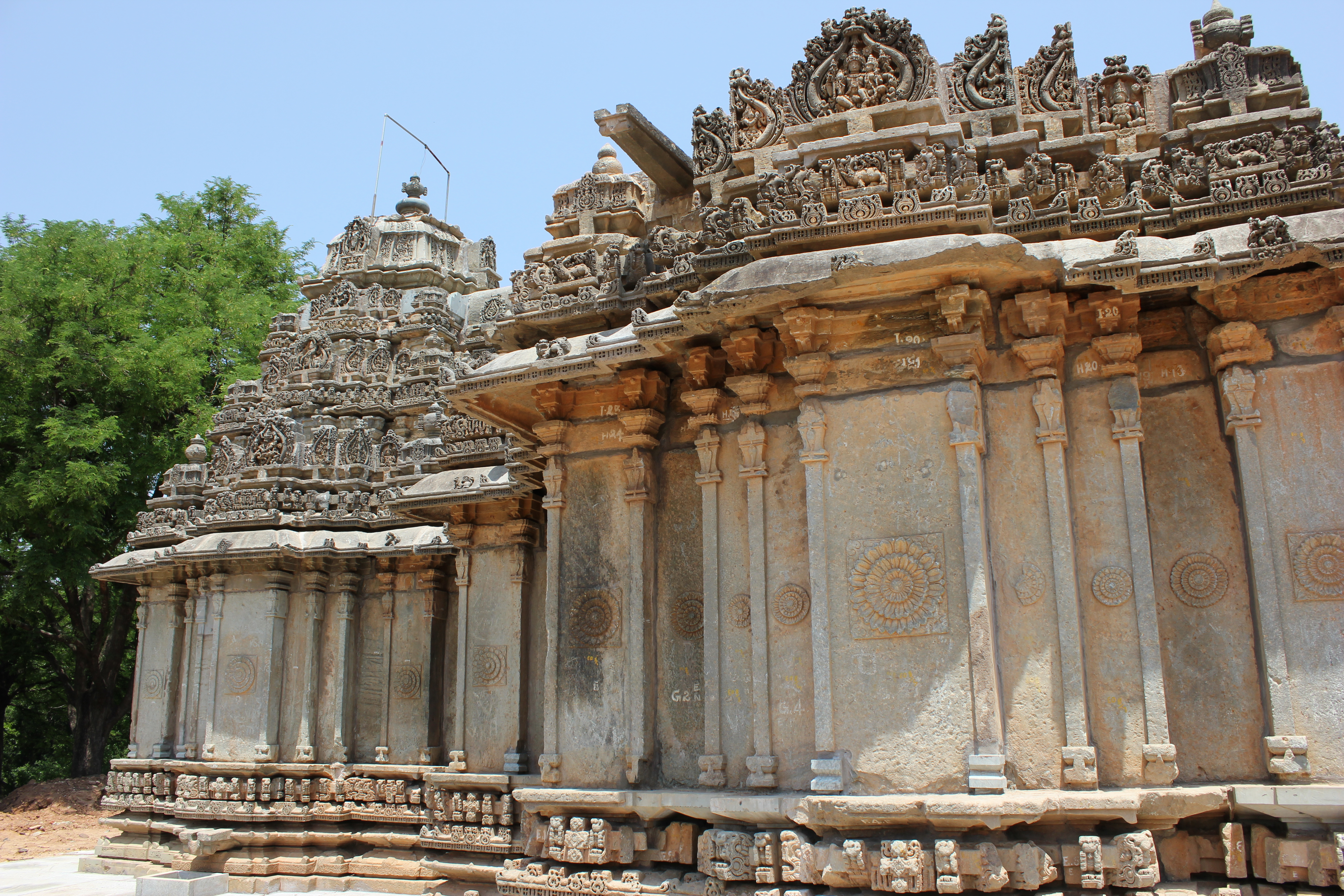
Profile of Lakshmi Narasimha temple at Vignasante

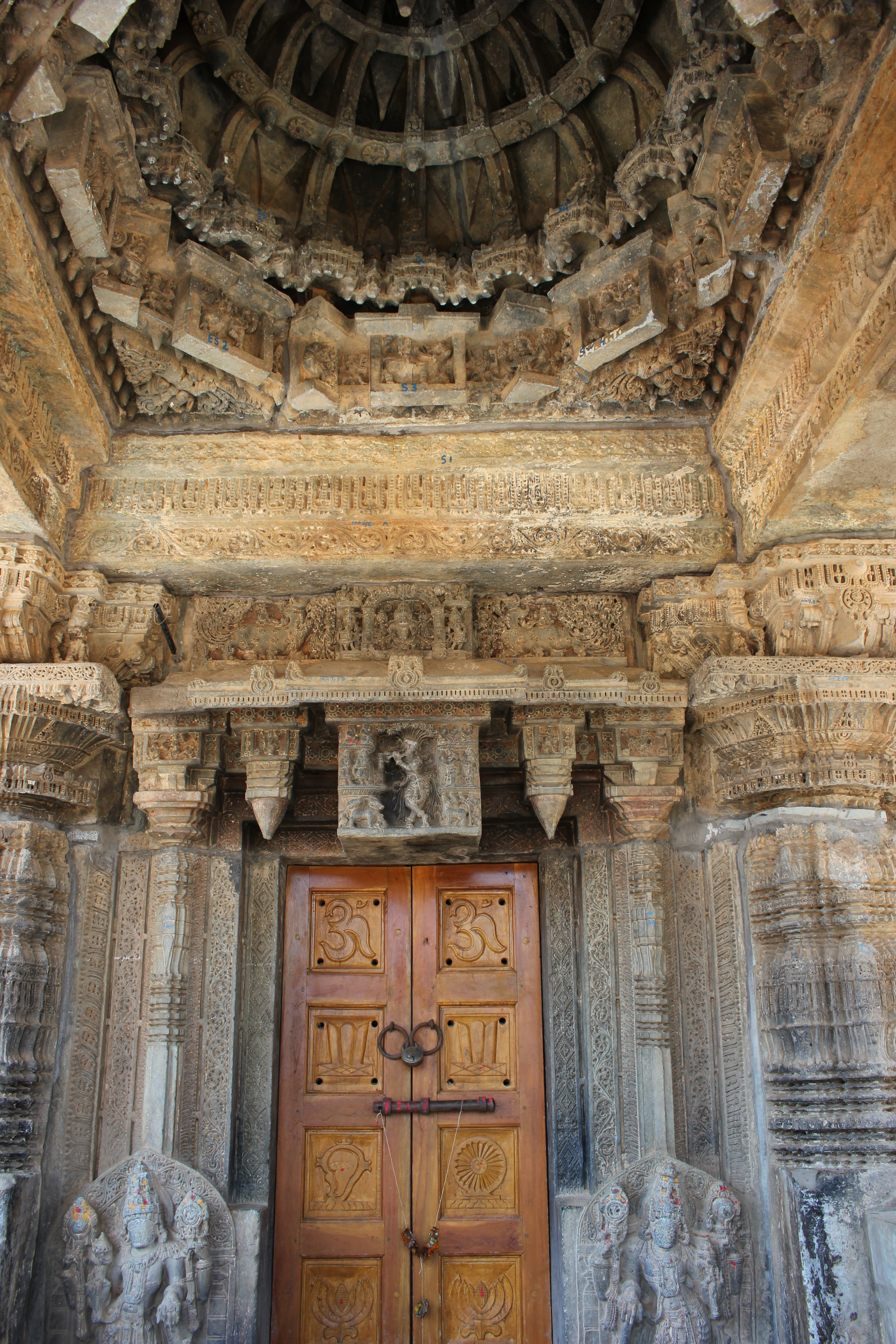
Domical ceiling above lintel in mukhamantapa (porch entrance) of Lakshmi Narasimha temple at Vignasante

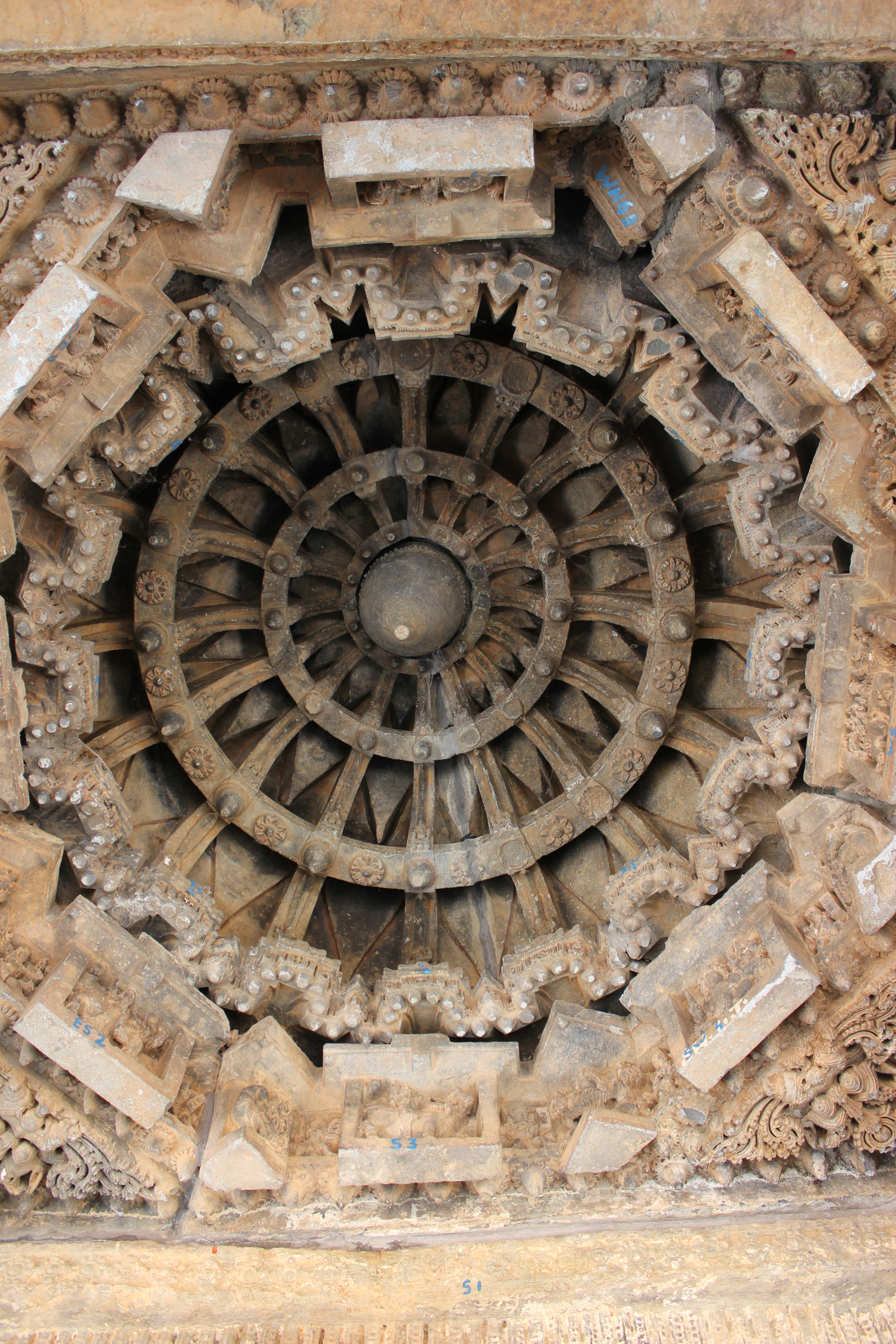
Domical ceiling over mukhamantapa in Lakshmi Narasimha temple at Vignasante

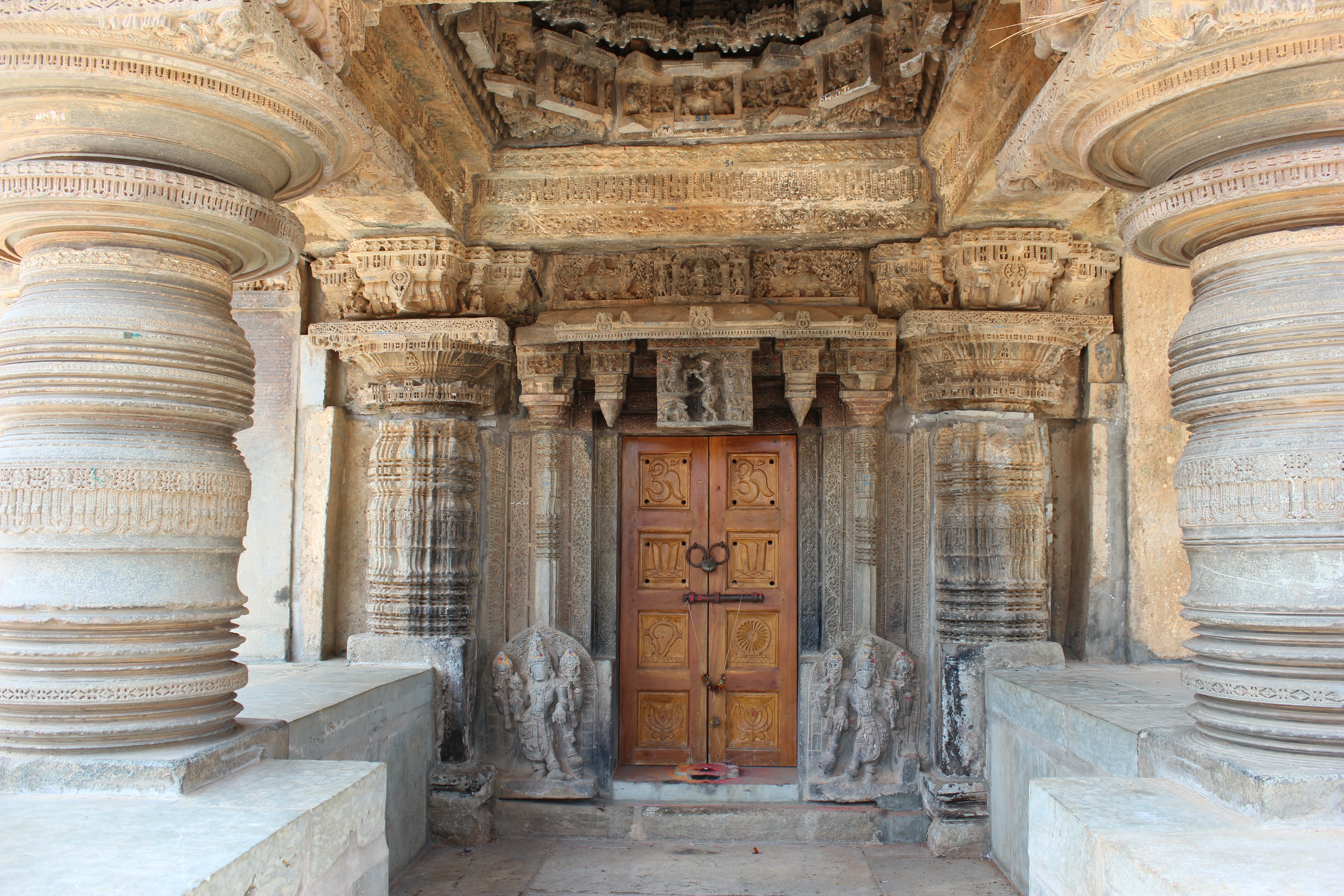
Lathe turned half pillars, ornamantal door jamb and lintel in the mukha mantapa of Lakshmi Narasimha temple at Vignasante

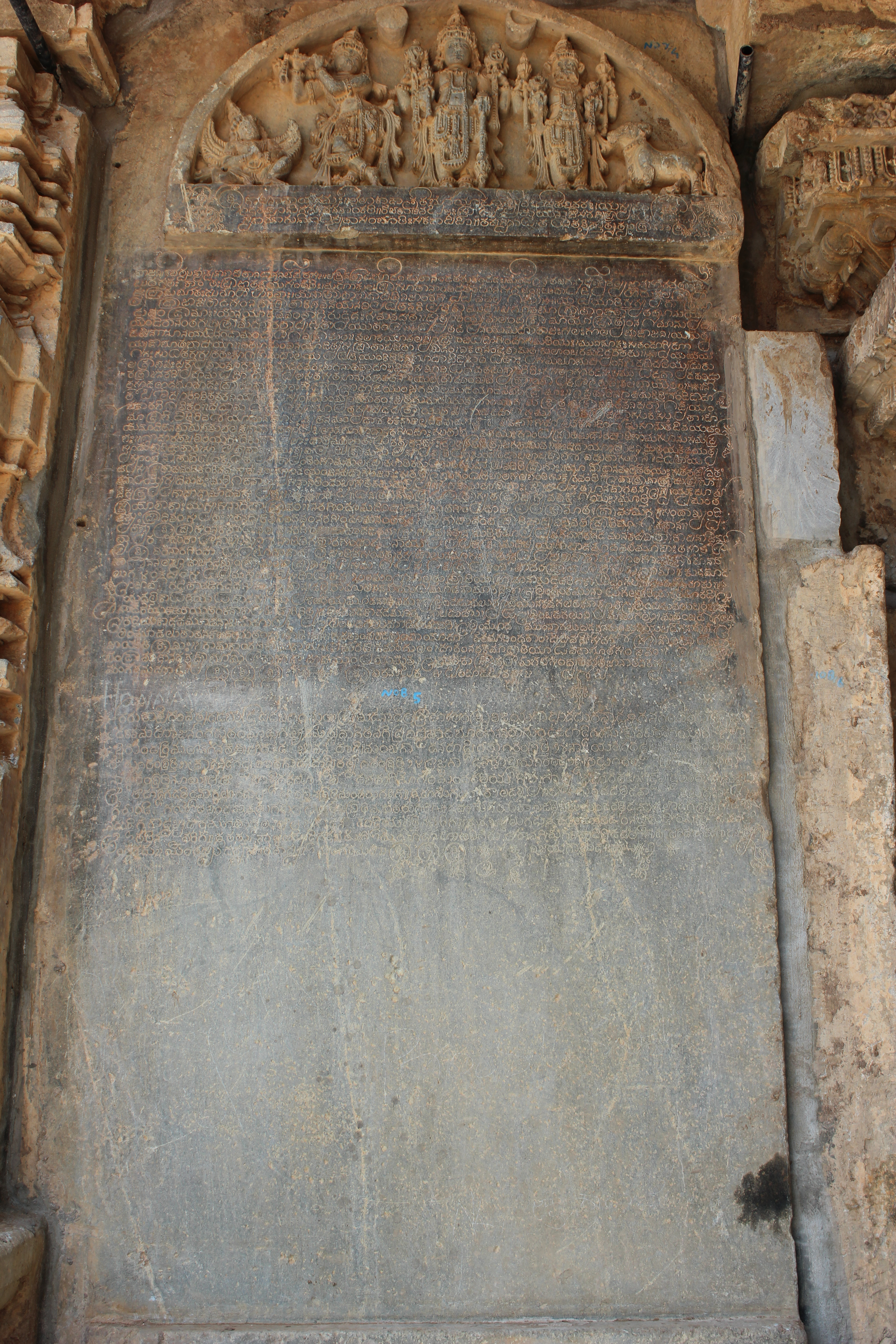
Old Kannada inscription in Lakshmi Narasimha temple at Vignasante

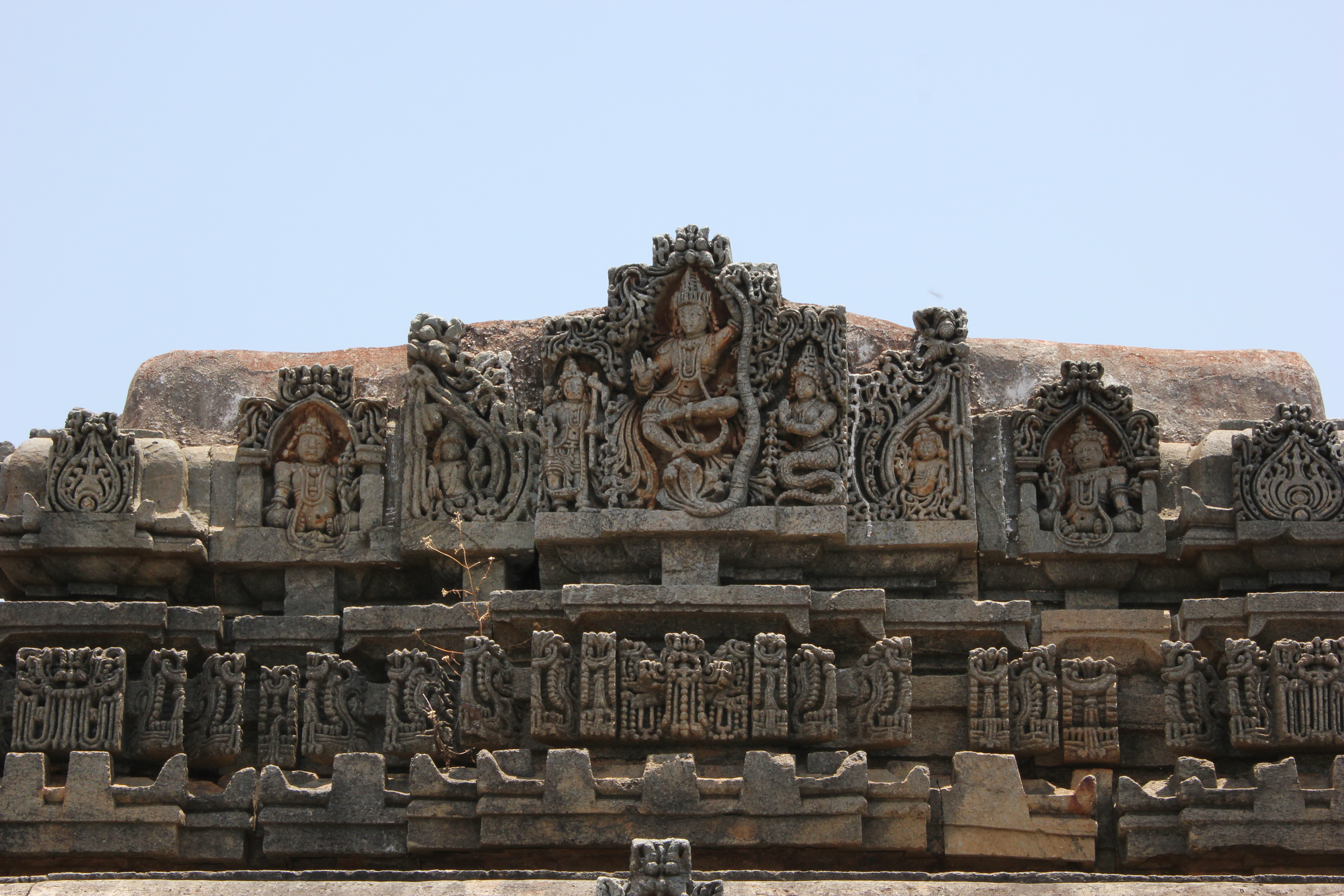
Ornate roof above mantapa in Lakshmi Narasimha temple at Vignasante
