= Bagur, Hassan =

Coordinates: 13°00′51″N 76°23′00″E

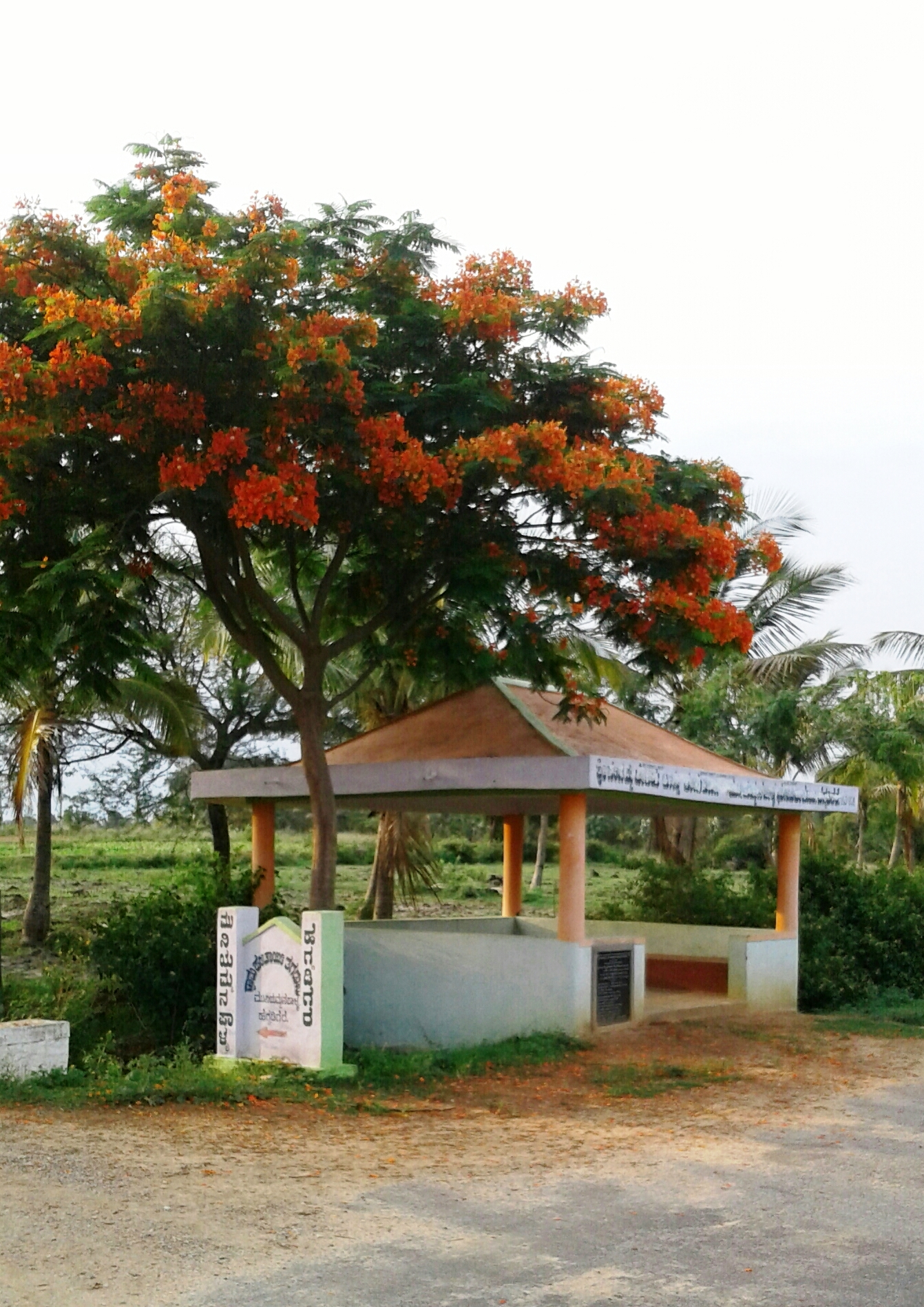
Bagur Nugehalli Road

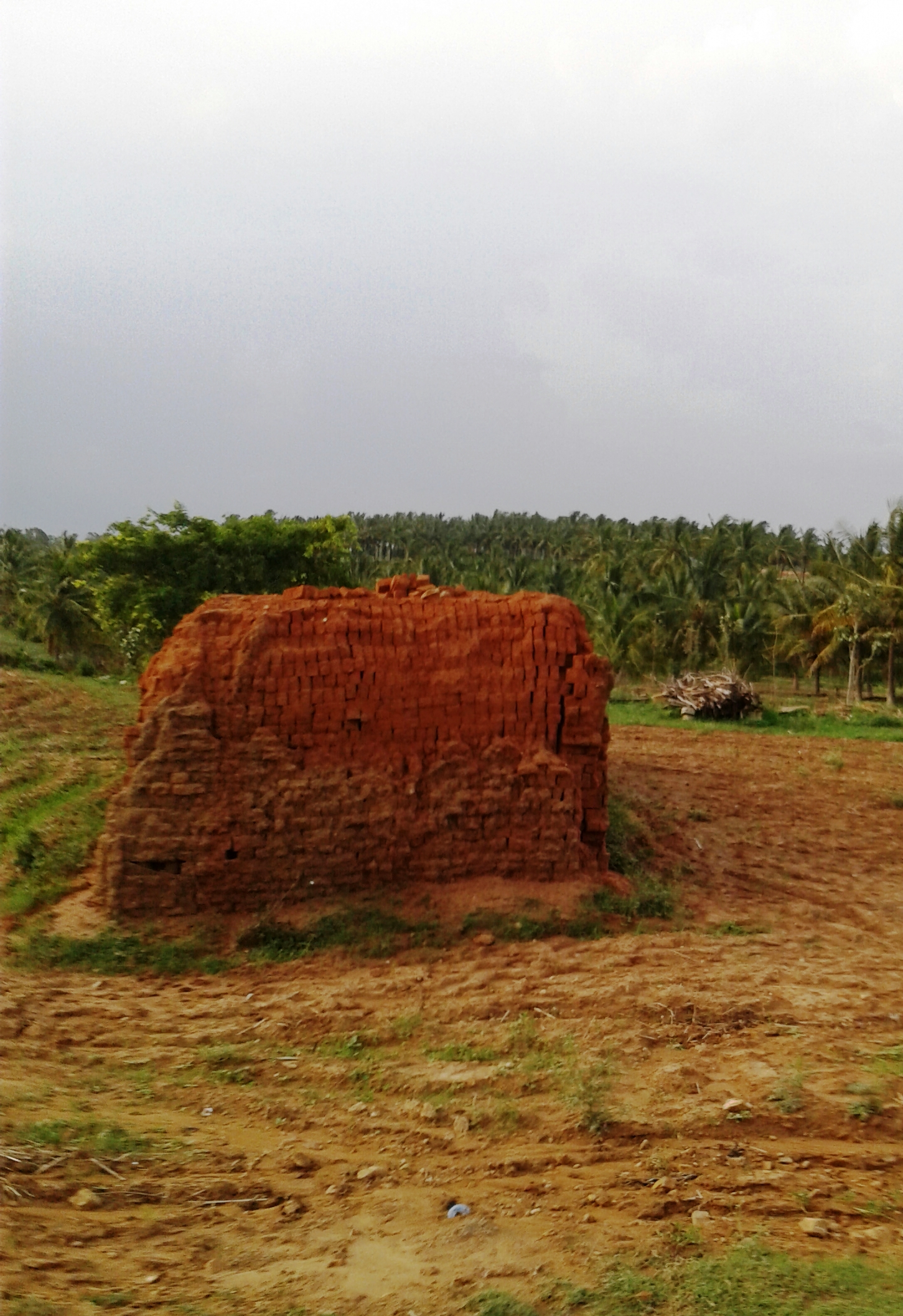
Nuggalli Road, Bagur

Bagur is a small village located at Channarayapatna taluka of Hassan district in Karnataka state of India.

== Demographics ==
Bagur has a population of 2,654 people.

== Post Office ==
There is a post office in Bagur and the pin code is 573111.

== Tourist attractions ==
The Lakshmi Narasimha temple, Nuggehalli was built in 1246 CE by Bommanna Dandanayaka, a commander in the Hoysala Empire during the rule of King Vira Someshwara. It is a good example of 13th century Hoysala architecture. Located a short distance away in Nuggehalli, and built around the same time is the Sadashiva temple. The town was called Vijaya Somanathapura in ancient times and gained importance as an agrahara (place of learning) during the time of Bommanna Dandanayaka. Nuggehalli, (also spelled "Nuggihalli"), is a town in Hassan district of Karnataka, India. It is located on the Tiptur-Channarayapatna state highway and is about 50 km from Hassan city. It is well connected by road with Bangalore, the state capital.

== Image gallery ==
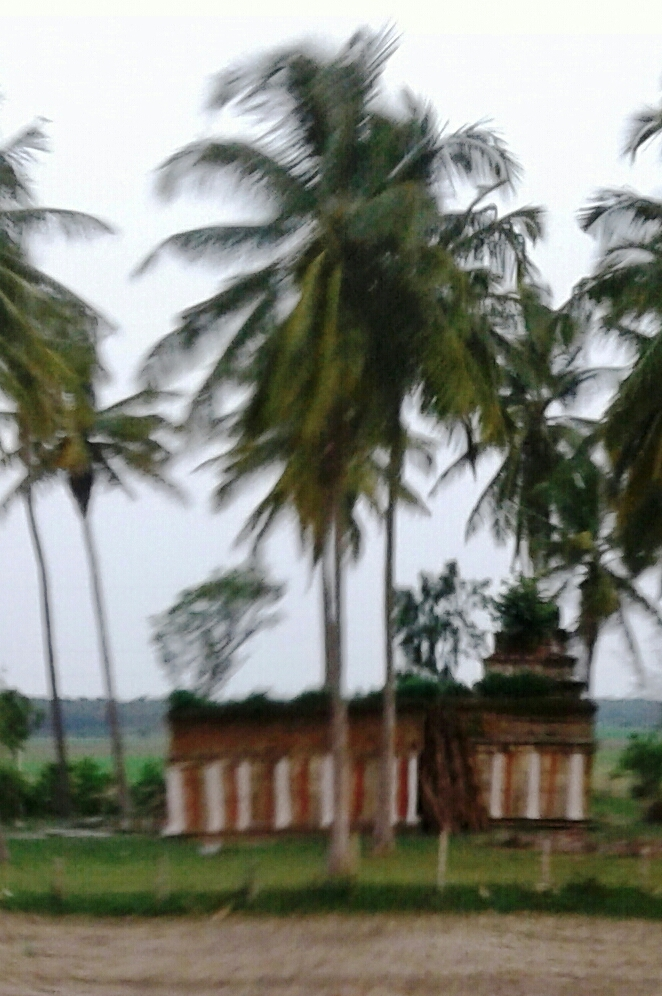
Nuggelli Road

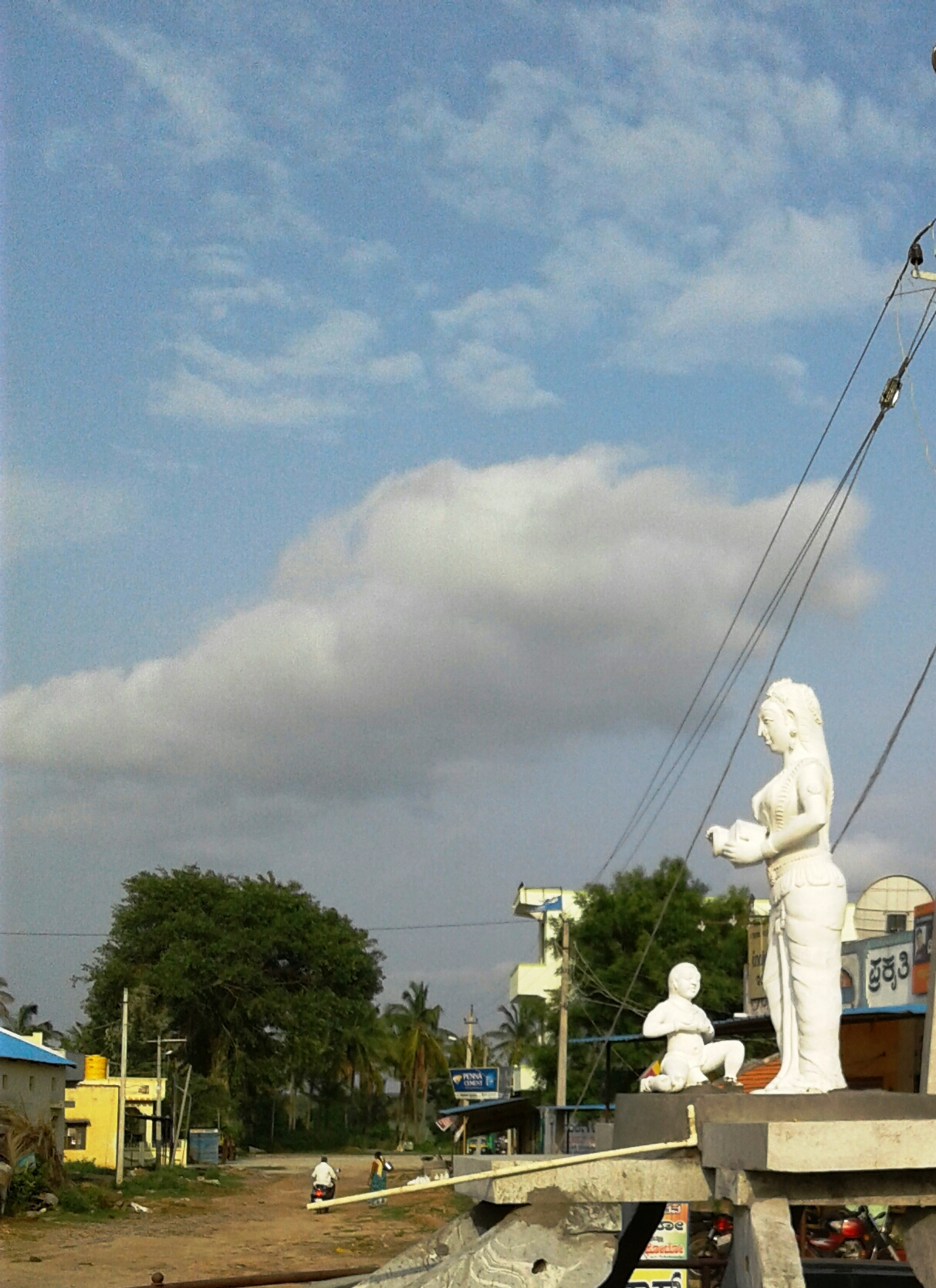
Bagur Town

Bagur Junction

== See also ==
- Channarayapatna
- Nuggehalli
