= Sadasiva Temple, Nuggehalli =

Sadashiva temple at Nuggehalli
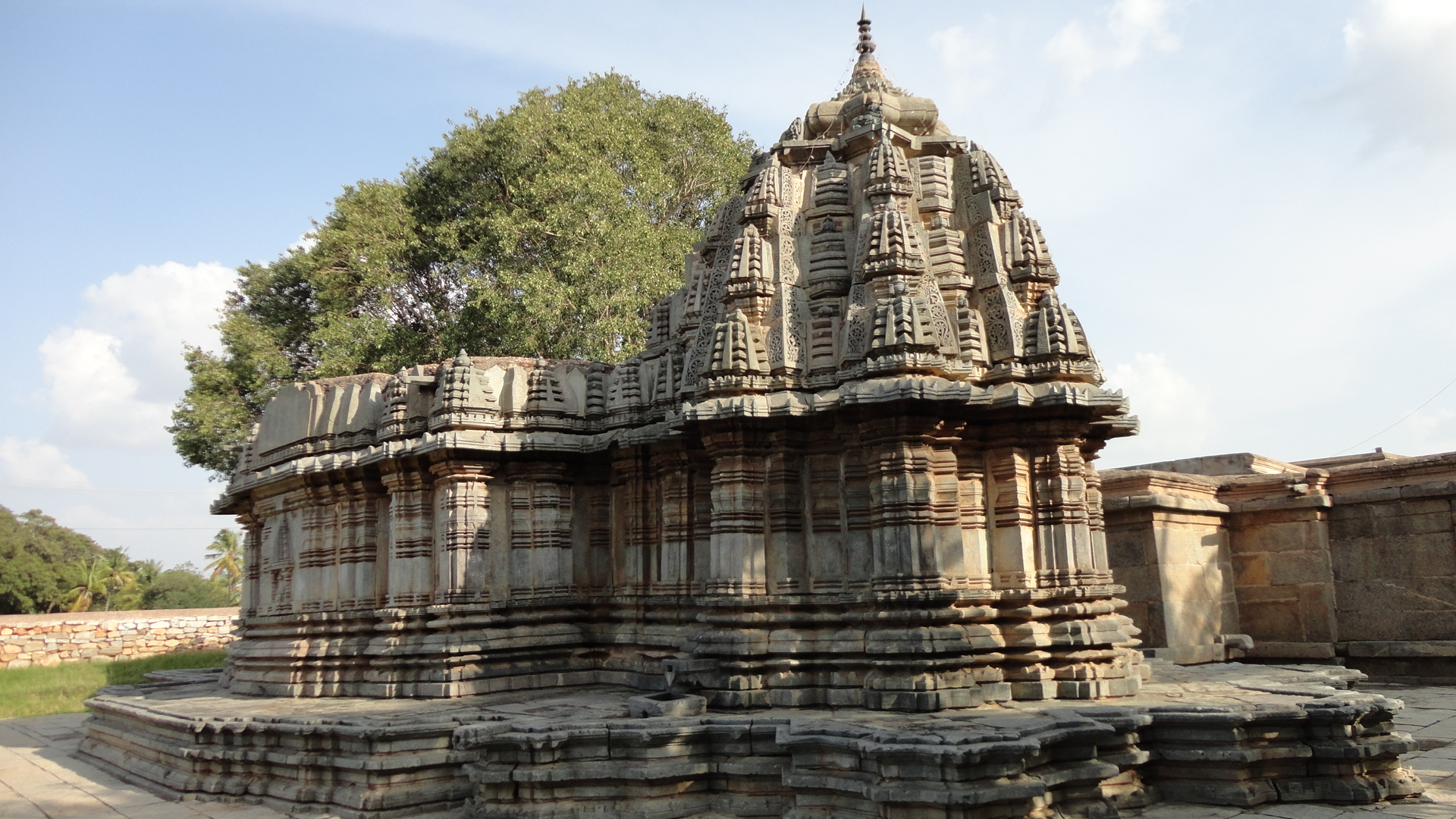

- Location within India Location within Karnataka

Religion
- Affiliation: Hinduism
- District: Hassan
- Deity: Shiva

Location
- Location: Nuggehalli
- State: Karnataka
- Country: India
- Interactive map of Sadashiva temple at Nuggehalli
- Coordinates: 13°00′40.5″N 76°28′37.9″E

Architecture
- Type: Hoysala
- Creator: Bommanna Dandanayaka
- Completed: c. 1246 CE

The Sadashiva temple at Nuggehalli is a 13th-century Shiva temple with Hoysala architecture in Nuggehalli village, Hassan district, Karnataka, India. The temple is one of the best illustrations of the Hoysala era Nagara temple with the stellate style, remarkable for its octagonal star configuration with clean, simple aesthetics. The brilliant synthesis of South Indian ideas with North Indian architectural plan makes it a special monument. It is also notable for its artwork that depicts legends of Shaivism, Vaishnavism, Shaktism, and Vedic deities together.

== Location and date ==
The Sadasiva Temple is located in Nuggehalli, (also spelled "Nuggihalli"), a town in the Hassan district of Karnataka, India. It is to the east of Lakshmi Narasimha temple and closer to the historic water reservoir to the northeast of the village. The town was called Vijaya Somanathapura in ancient times and gained importance as an agrahara (place of learning) during the time of Bommanna Dandanayaka. The Sadasiva temple is a fine example of Hoysala nagara style of architecture with Bhumija type superstructure.

It was completed in c.1249 by Bommanna Dandanayaka, a commander in the Hoysala Empire during the rule of King Vira Someshwara.

== Architecture and furnishings ==
This unusual Hoysala temple combines ekakuta ("one superstructure and shrine") architecture with a nagara (north Indian) styled tower. The Vimana has a stellate plan with an octagonal star configuration. Each bhadra follows this same rhythm. Merged with the Vimana is the square gudha-mandapa flourished with orthogonal ratha. Thus, the sthanapati and shilpins (architect and artisans) were able to exhaustively and successfully create a "highly sophisticated rotating shape far beyond the innovations found in Chalukyan architecture" of the previous centuries, states Dhaky, a scholar of temple architecture and history. The temple is quasi-Bhumija with South Indian ideas on the rotating square principle of Hindu architecture. This synthesis creates a symphony in the geometric configuration of its stellate base and the outer walls, all the way to the North Indian style shikhara.

The shrine's walls and the mantapa have an austere appearance, with no sculptural decoration. Yet the successful integration of the Nagara quasi-Bhumija architecture with South Indian flourish makes this temple one of the most important Hoysala monuments in architectural context. The temple is built on a jagati (platform) and the building material used is Soapstone (green–chloritic schist). It has a large "linga" (the universal symbol of the god Shiva) in its sanctum and an equally large and extremely well carved Nandi in a closed hall with walls that have perforated stone windows. The temple also has a unique life-size standing image of the goddess Parvati (consort of Shiva). The images of the navagraha (lit, "nine planets") facing each other is another unique feature. There are two images of the god Ganesha (son of Shiva), one outside the sanctum and the other at the entrance to the sanctum housing the goddess Parvati. In the common hall are the intricately carved independent images (not in frieze) of deities from the Hindu pantheon that are noteworthy: Chamundeshwari (one of seven Saptamatrikas, Shaktism), Kartikeya and Ganesha (sons of Parvati and Shiva), Kala Bhairava (a ferocious form of Shiva), a set of images depicting the different incarnations (avatars) of Vishnu, Parvati, and Surya (the Sun god).

== Gallery ==
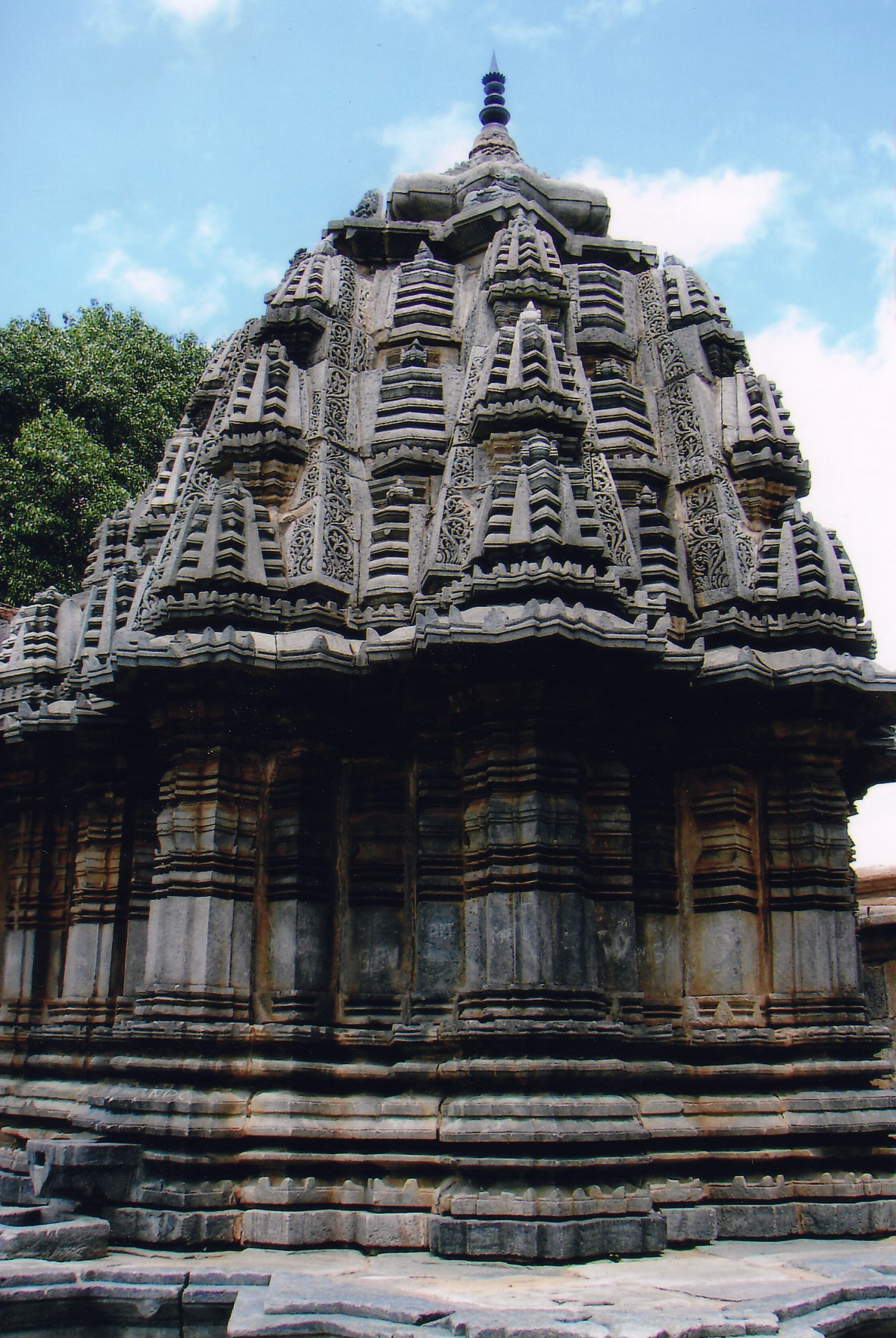
Close up of Sadashiva temple with Hoysala nagara shrine and superstructure (Hoysala adaptation of nagara style of architecture) at Nuggehalli

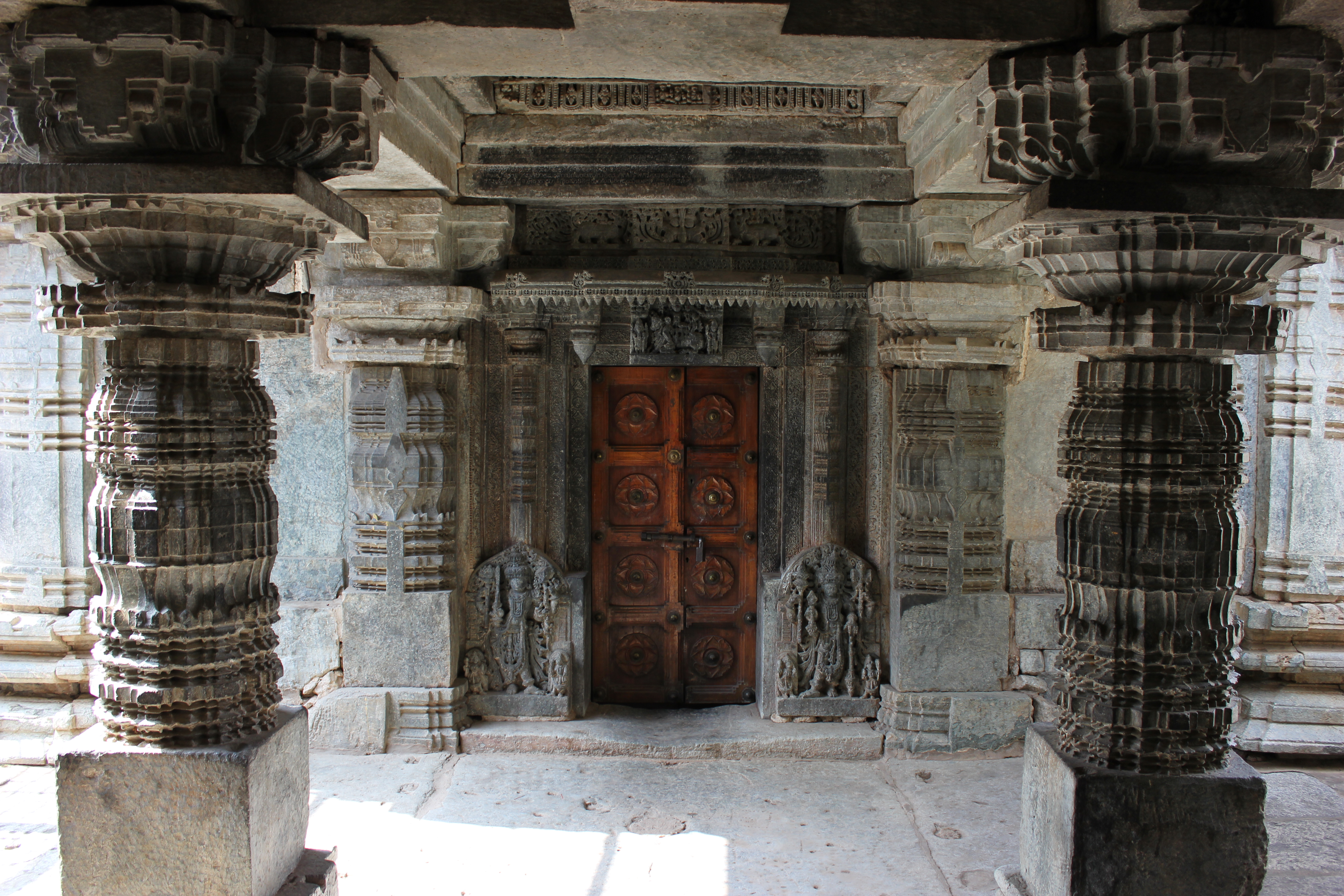
Entrance to Sadashiva temple at Nuggehalli

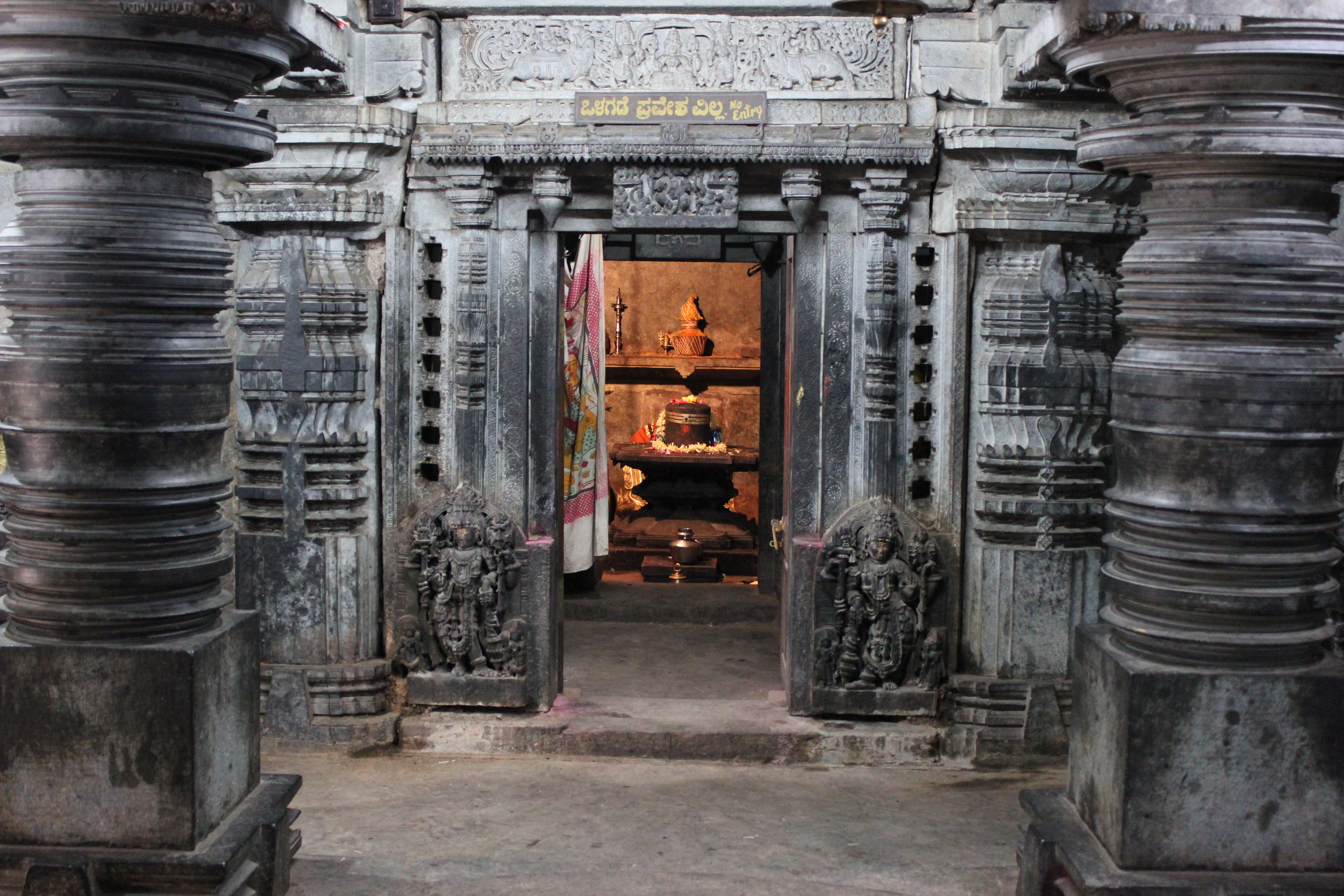
Mantapa with lathe turned pillars in the Sadashiva temple at Nuggehalli

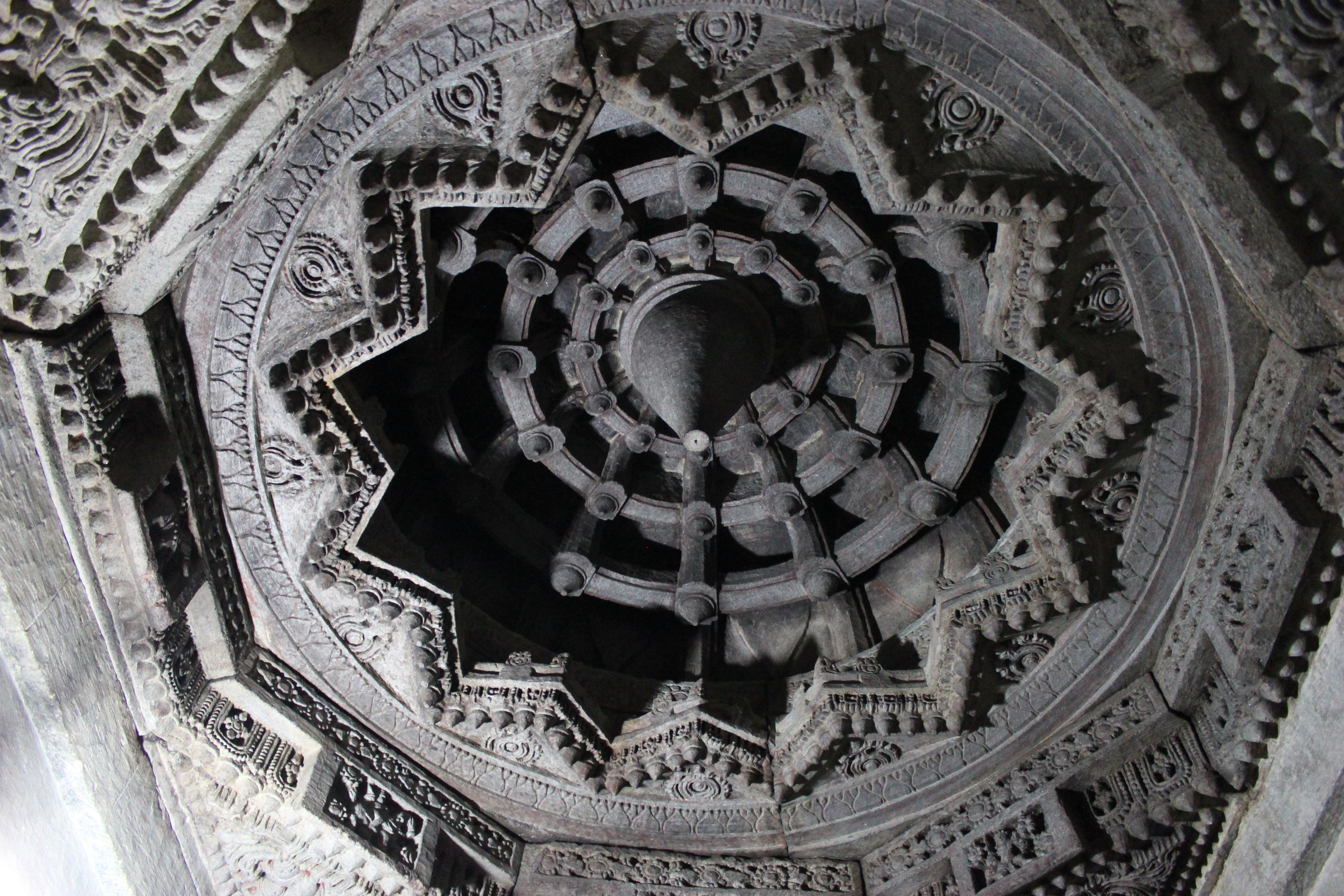
Domical bay ceiling art in Sadashiva temple at Nuggehalli

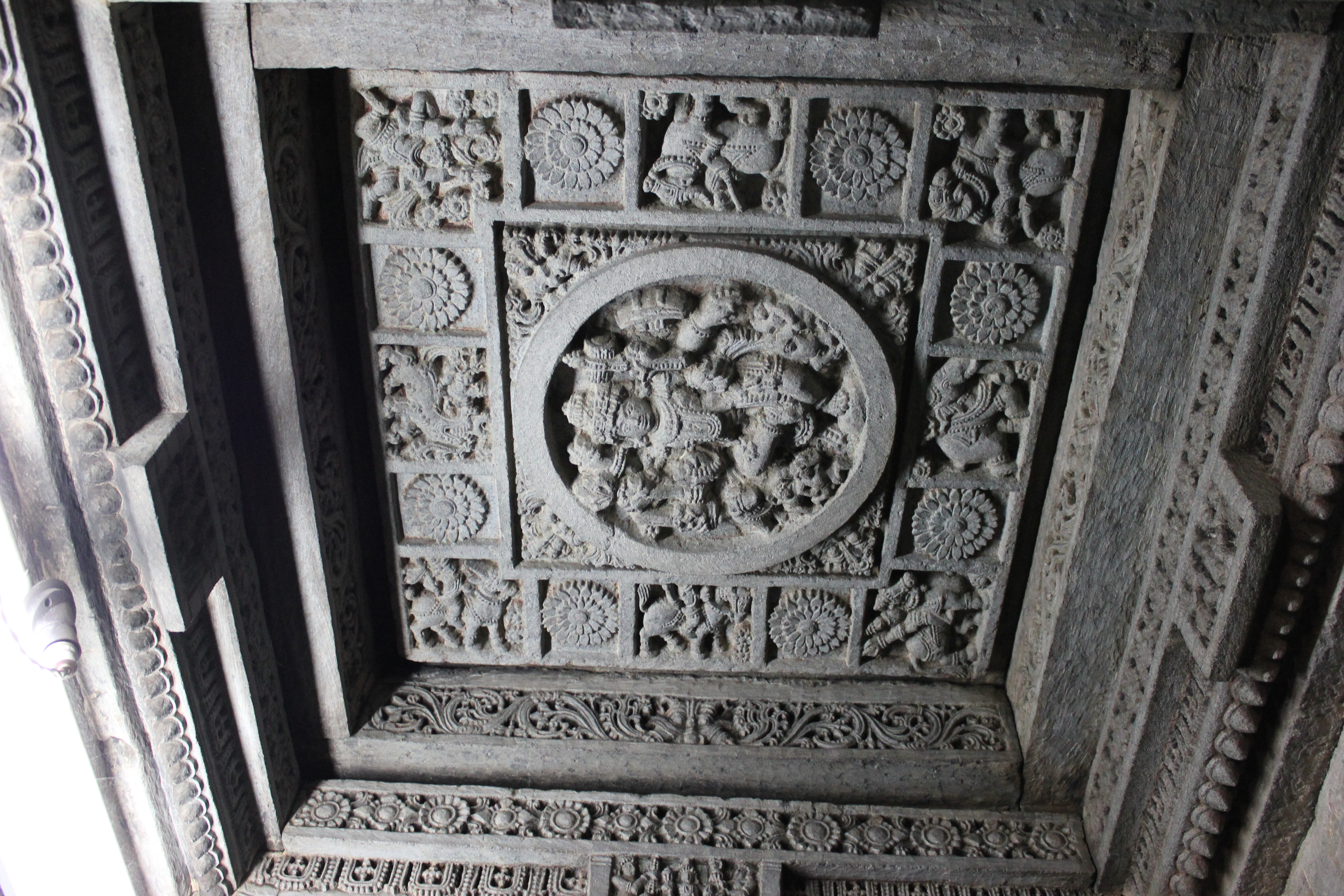
Decorative bay ceiling art in Sadashiva temple at Nuggehalli

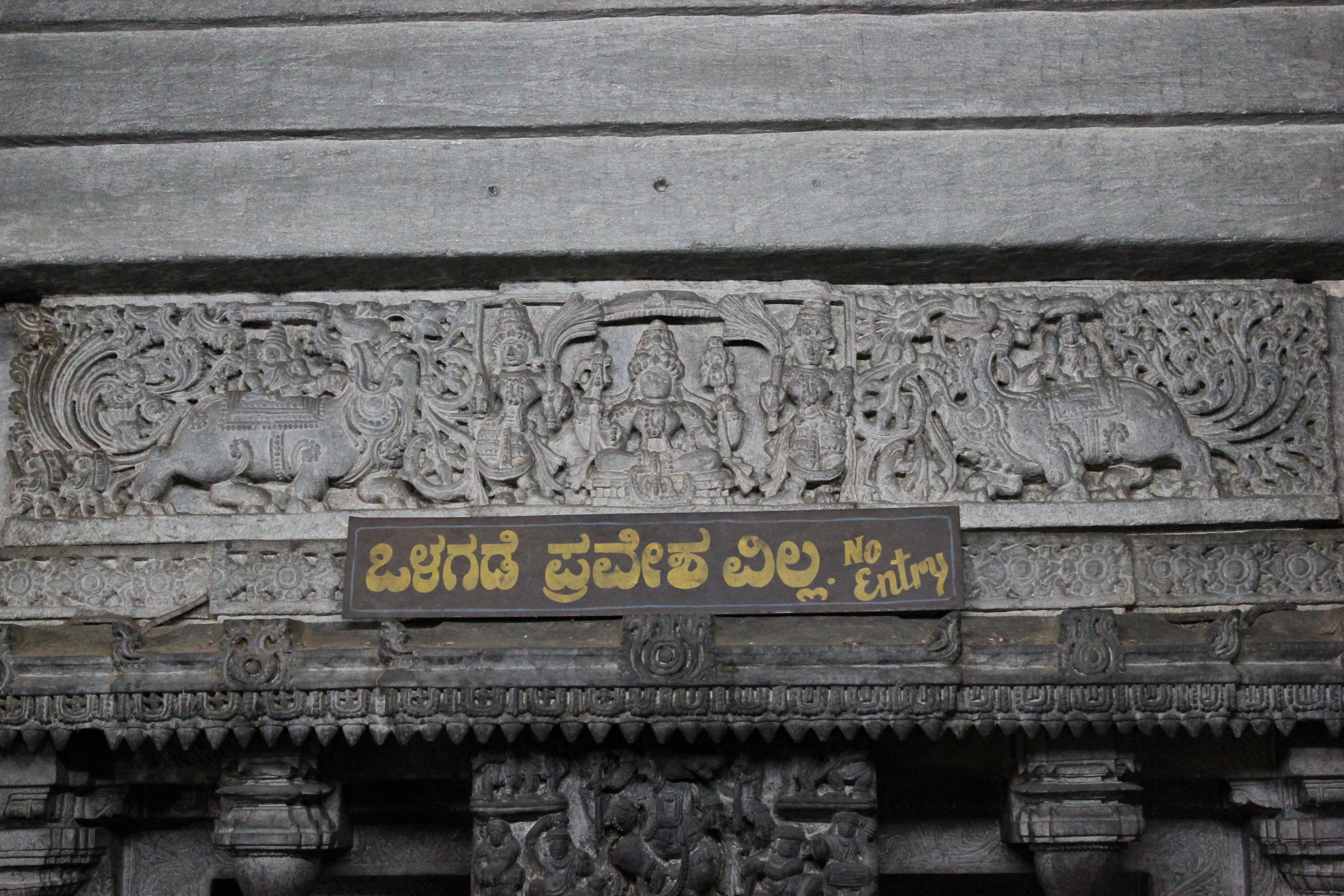
Lintel art in Sadashiva temple at Nuggehalli

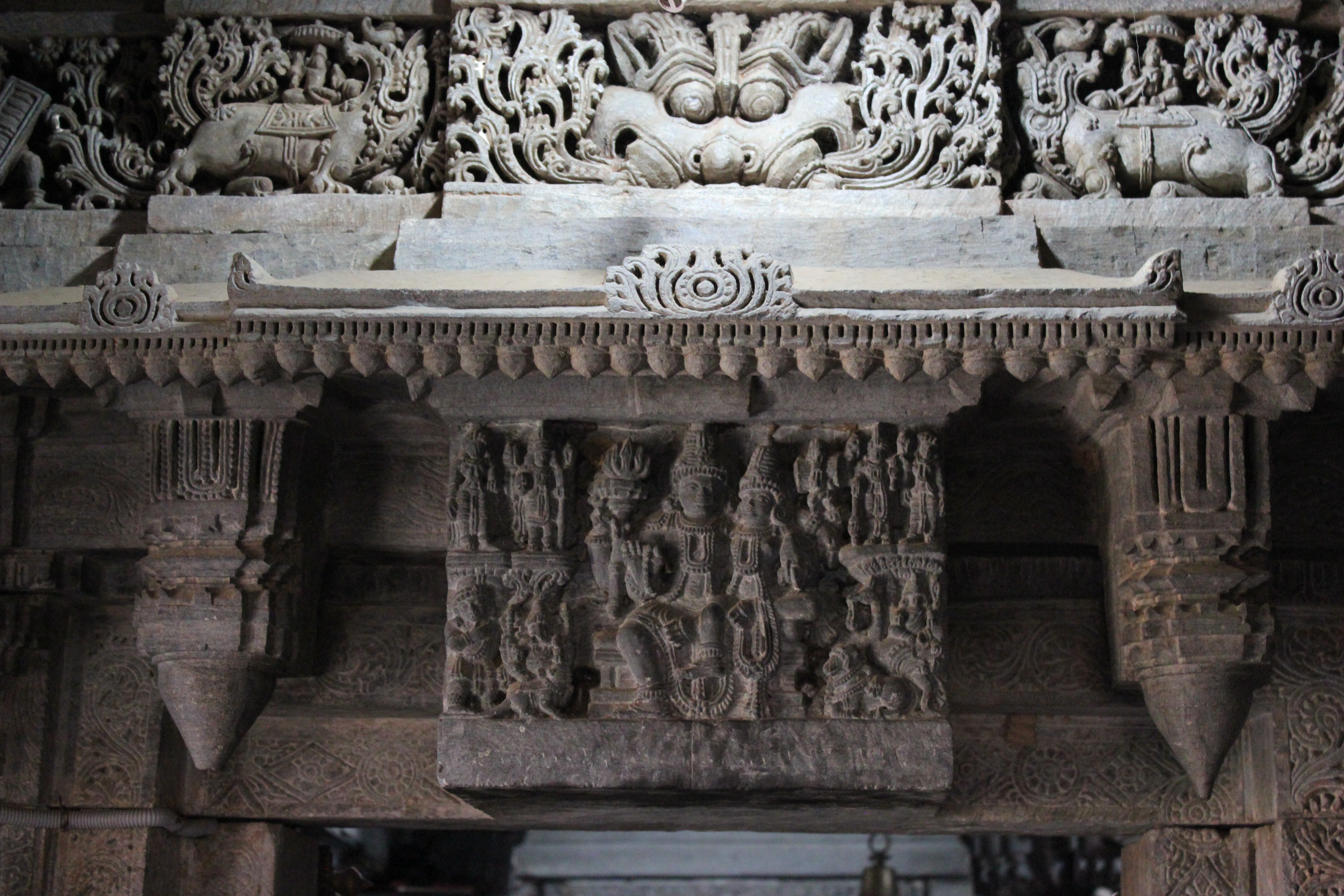
Lintel art in Sadashiva temple at Nuggehalli

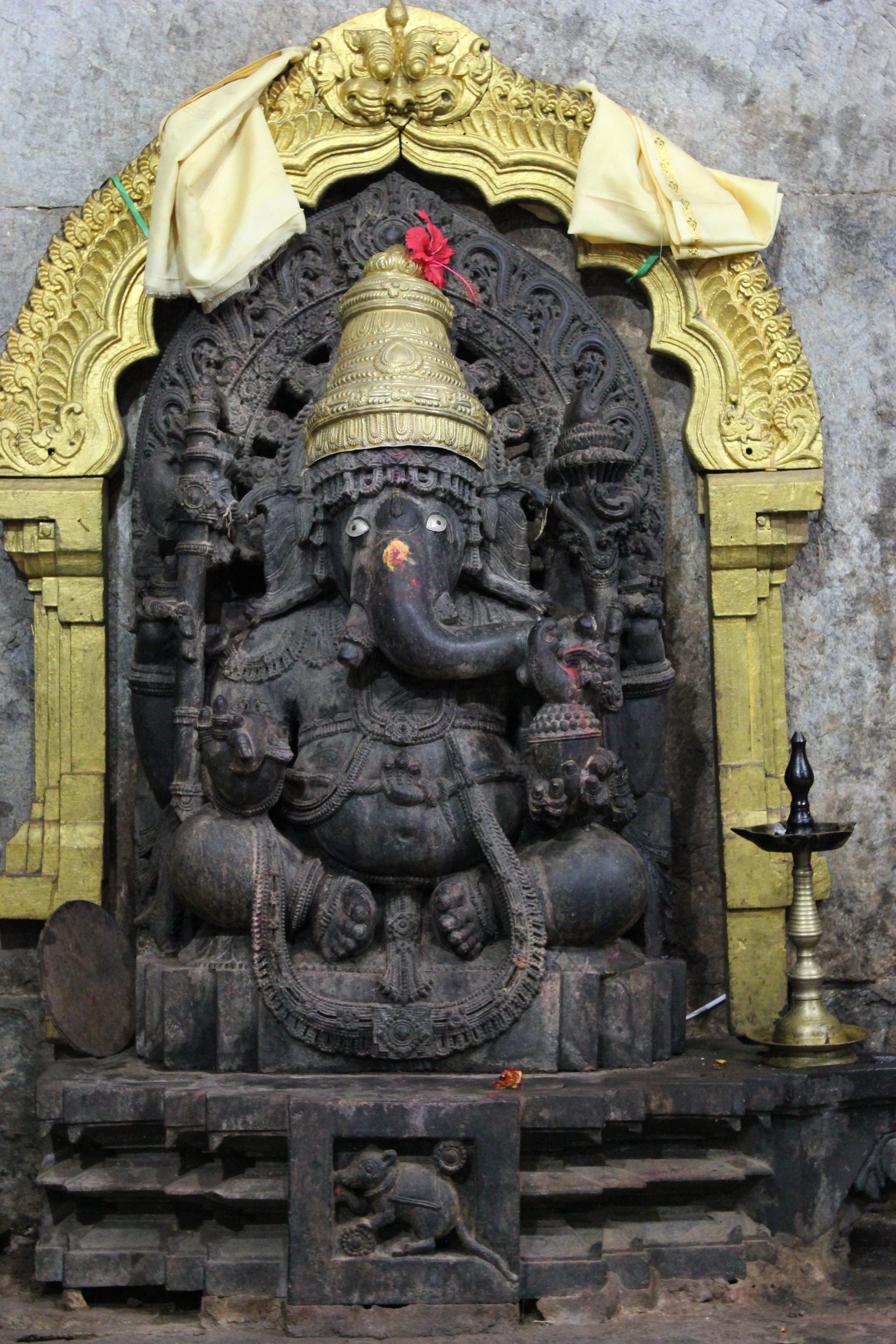
Ganesha sculpture in Sadashiva temple at Nuggehalli
