= Lakshmi Narasimha Temple, Nuggehalli =

Lakshminarasimha temple at Nuggehalli
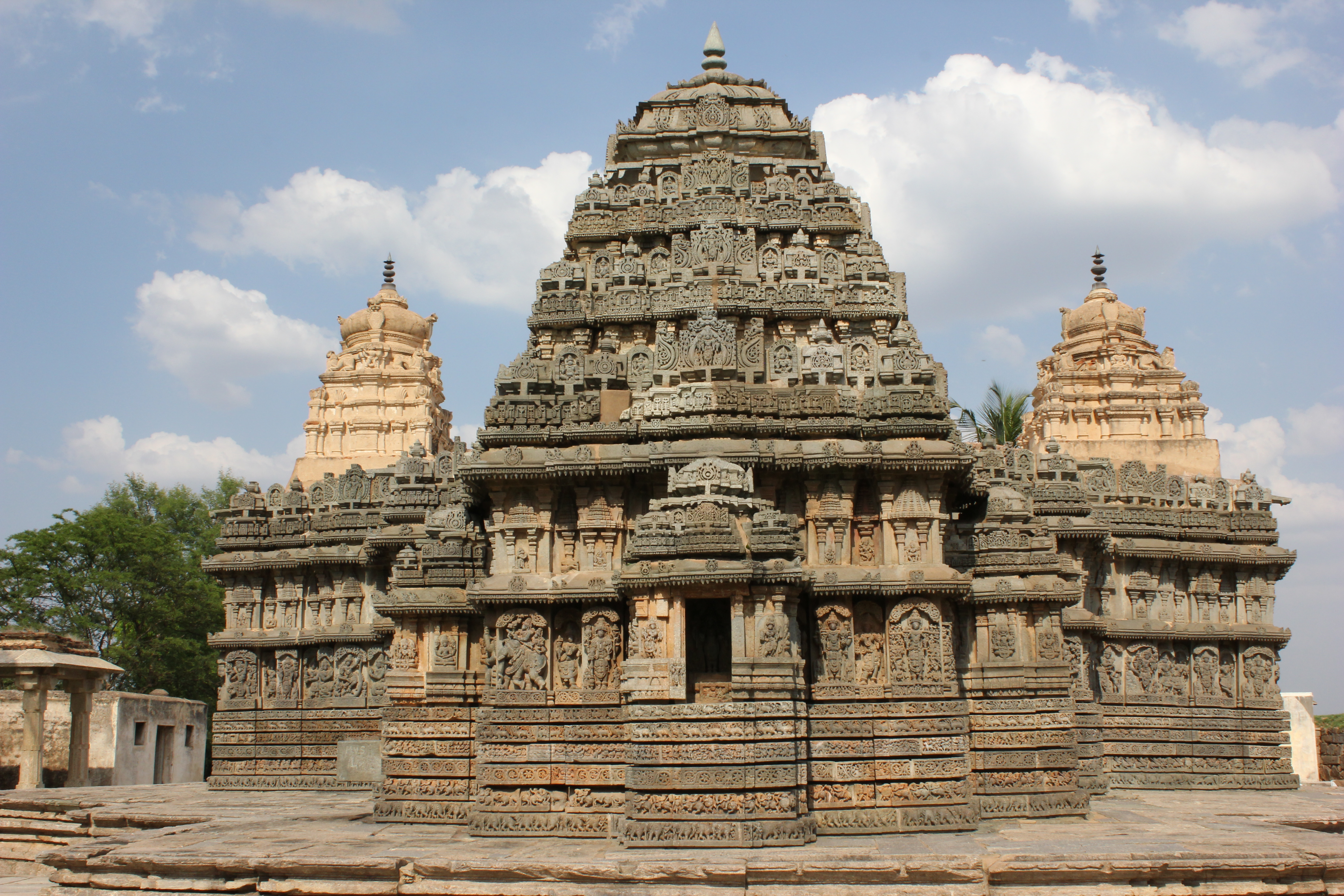

- Location within India

Religion
- Affiliation: Hinduism
- District: Hassan
- Deity: Vishnu, Lakshmi Narasimha

Location
- Location: Nuggehalli
- State: Karnataka
- Country: India
- Interactive map of Lakshminarasimha temple at Nuggehalli
- Coordinates: 13°00′39.4″N 76°28′31.3″E

Architecture
- Type: Hoysala
- Creator: Bommanna Dandanayaka
- Completed: c. 1246 CE

Website
- www.nuggehalli.org

The Lakshmi Narasimha temple is a 13th-century Hindu temple with Hoysala architecture in Nuggehalli village, Hassan district, Karnataka, India. This three shrine Vaishnava complex is dedicated to Keshava, Lakshmi Narasimha, and Venugopala. It was built in 1246 CE by Bommanna Dandanayaka, a commander in the Hoysala Empire during the rule of King Vira Someshwara.

The temple is notable for its Vaishnava reliefs, Shaiva reliefs such as those of Harihara, Dakshinamurti, Chandikesvara and Ganesha, Shakti reliefs such as of Durga Mahisasuramardini, dancing Lakshmi and Saraswati, as well as Vedic deities such as Surya and Brahma. The lower section depicts scenes from the Hindu epics and the Bhagavata Purana. The artwork completed and signed by the Hoysala artist Mallitamma are particularly notable.

== Location and date ==
Nuggehalli, also referred to as Nuggihalli or Nuggelli, is located in Channarayapatna taluk of Hassan district in Karnataka state, India. It is located on the Tiptur-Channarayapatna state highway and is about 50 km from Hassan city (NH 75, SH 47). It is about 80 km southeast of Halebidu, and is well connected by road with Bangalore, the state capital.

The town was called Vijaya Somanathapura before the 14th-century and gained importance as an agrahara (place of learning) during the time of Bommanna Dandanayaka. The Lakshmi Narasimha temple was built in 1246 CE by Bommanna Dandanayaka, a commander in the Hoysala Empire during the rule of King Vira Someshwara. It is a good example of 13th century Hoysala architecture. Located a short distance away in Nuggehalli, and built around the same time is the Sadashiva temple.

== Description ==
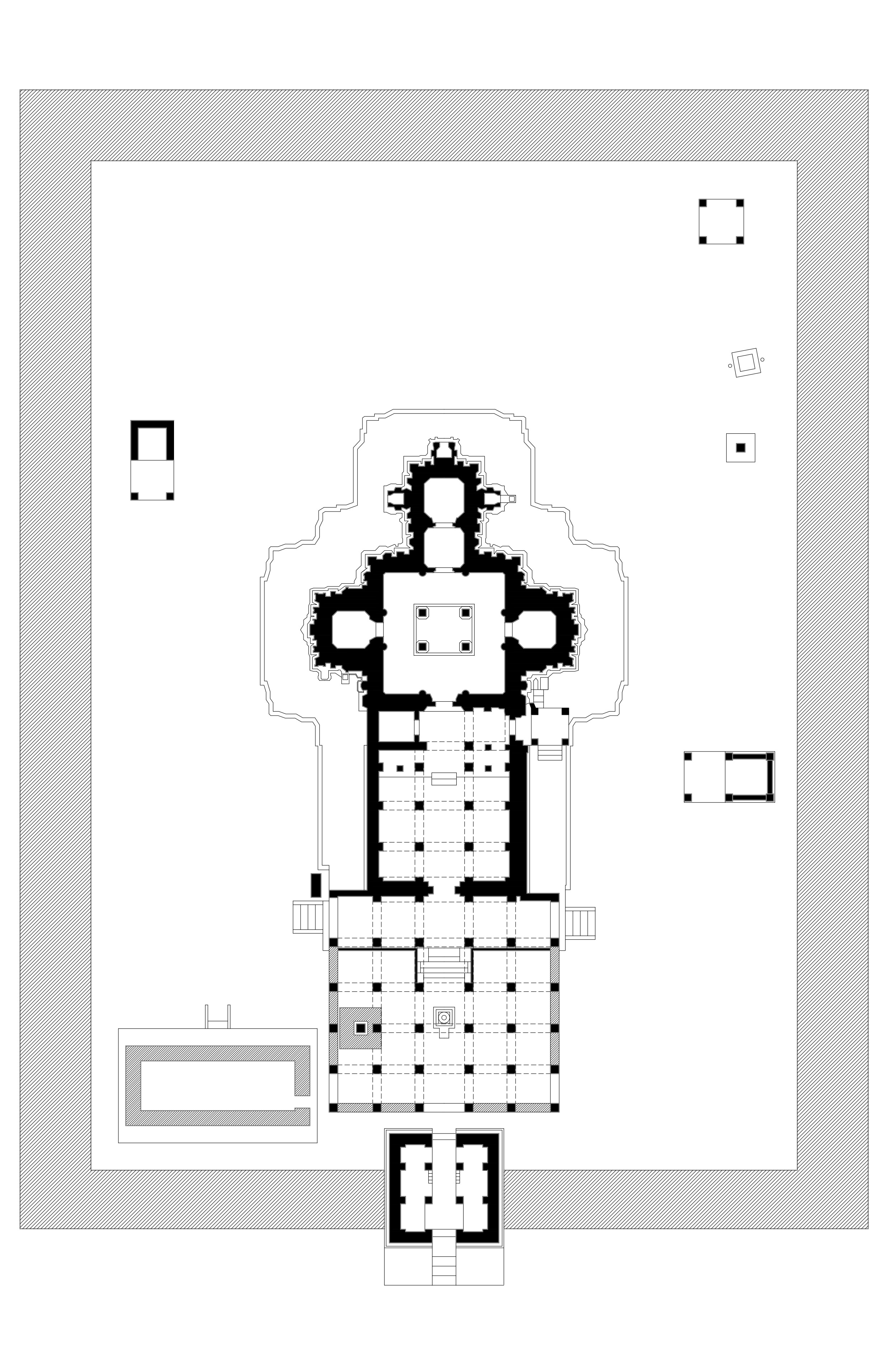
Floor plan of the Lakshminarasimha temple, Nuggehalli

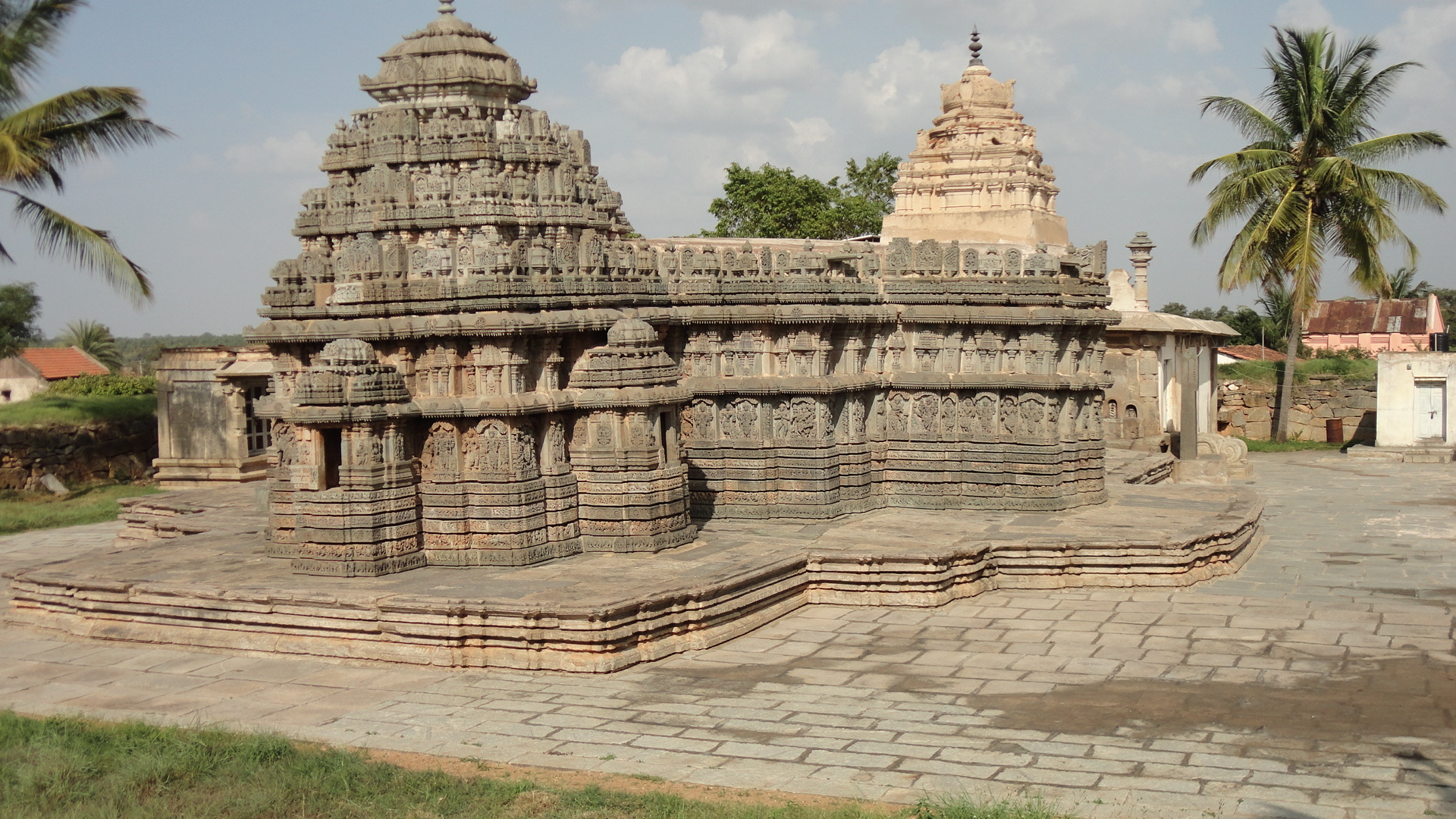
Lakshmi Narasimha temple, view from the southwestern corner

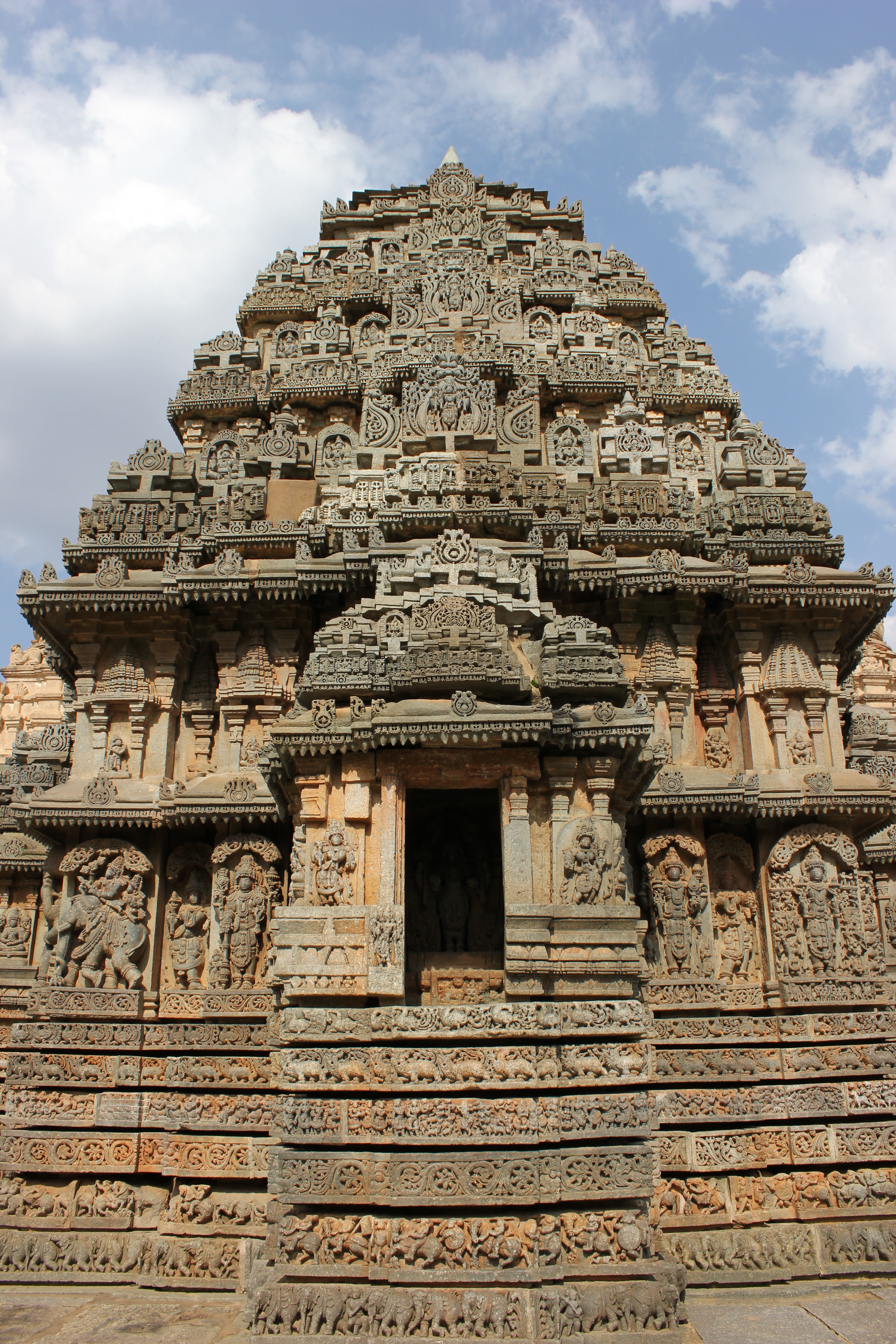
Shrine outer wall with projecting minor shrine (aedicula) in Lakshmi Narasimha temple at Nuggehalli

This is a good example of a richly decorated Hoysala temple built in the trikuta (three towers) vimana (shrine) style with fine sculptures adorning the walls. The material used is Chloritic Schist, more commonly known as Soapstone) and the temple is built on a jagati (platform) that closely follows the plan of the temple.

The size of the original temple can be considered small, to which a larger open mantapa(hall) was later added. The three shrines are located around a central closed ranga-mantapa with 9 "bays" (compartment between four pillars). The ceiling of the closed mantapa is supported by four lathe turned pillars which is deeply domed in the center. The central shrine is the most prominent one and has a large tower. This shrine has a vestibule that connects the shrine to the mantapa (hall). Consequently, the vestibule also has a tower (or superstructure, shikhara) that looks like a shorter extension of the main tower. It is called the sukanasi. According to Foekema, it looks like the "nose" of the main tower. The other two shrines have smaller towers and because they have no vestibule to connect them to the central mantapa, they have no sukanasi. The three shrines contain the images of Venugopala, Keshava and Lakshmi narasimha, all avatars of Vishnu.

From outside, the temple actually looks like a ekakuta (single tower and shrine) temple because the two lateral shrines are simple extensions of the wall of the mantapa. Their towers are a later addition. This is a classic example of a trikuta (three shrines and towers) that looks like a ekakuta. A large open hall with tall pillars was added during later times making the original porch and closed mantapa look like the inner portion of the temple. The central shrine has five projections per side and the tower is complete though has lost its kalasha (decorative structure on top). Since the shrine is square in plan, the topping roof (a helmet like sculptured stone) follows the same plan. There are three tiers of decorative smaller roofs bearing their own kalasa that form the body of the main tower. The superstructure on top of the vestibule (forming the nose) has only two tiers of decorative roofs. This is why the sukanasi looks like an extension of the main tower. The two lateral shrines also have five projections per side. The top of these shrines and the wall of the mantapa are crowned with a row of decorated roofs just like the main shrine.

According to art critic Gerard Foekema, the temple is of a "newer" Hoysala style, and below the superstructure of the vimana where the roof meets the outer walls of the temple, two eaves all round the temple. The upper eaves projects about half a meter from the wall. There is a second eaves running about a meter below the upper eaves with decorative miniature towers (aedicule) between them. The wall images of Hindu deities and their attendants are below the lower eaves, and there are 120 such sculptured panels in all. Below these are six moldings of equal size with decorations in frieze. This according to historian Kamath is the "horizontal treatment" that is a hallmark of the later Hoysala temples.

The six moldings at the base of the wall is divided into two sections. Starting from the base where the wall meets the jagati, the first horizontal lmolding contains procession of elephants, above which are a horsemen, and a band of foliage on the third. The second horizontal section starts with depictions from the Hindu epics and puranic scenes executed with detail. Above this are two friezes of yalis (or makara, an imaginary beast) and hamsas (swans). The vimana tower is divided into three horizontal sections and is even more ornate than the walls.

The images in the panels are mostly Vaishnava in faith and they are attributed to two well known Hoysala sculptors, Baichoja and Mallitamma. However, like many Hindu temples, other traditions are included. There are a few images of the god Shiva in the form of Bhairava along with his consort Bhairavi. Baichoja's sculptures are on the south side of the temple and according to Foekema, have a certain peace and dignity about them. Mallitamma's sculptures are on the north side. According to him, while they are not as fine, they are lively and have greater variety.

== Gallery ==
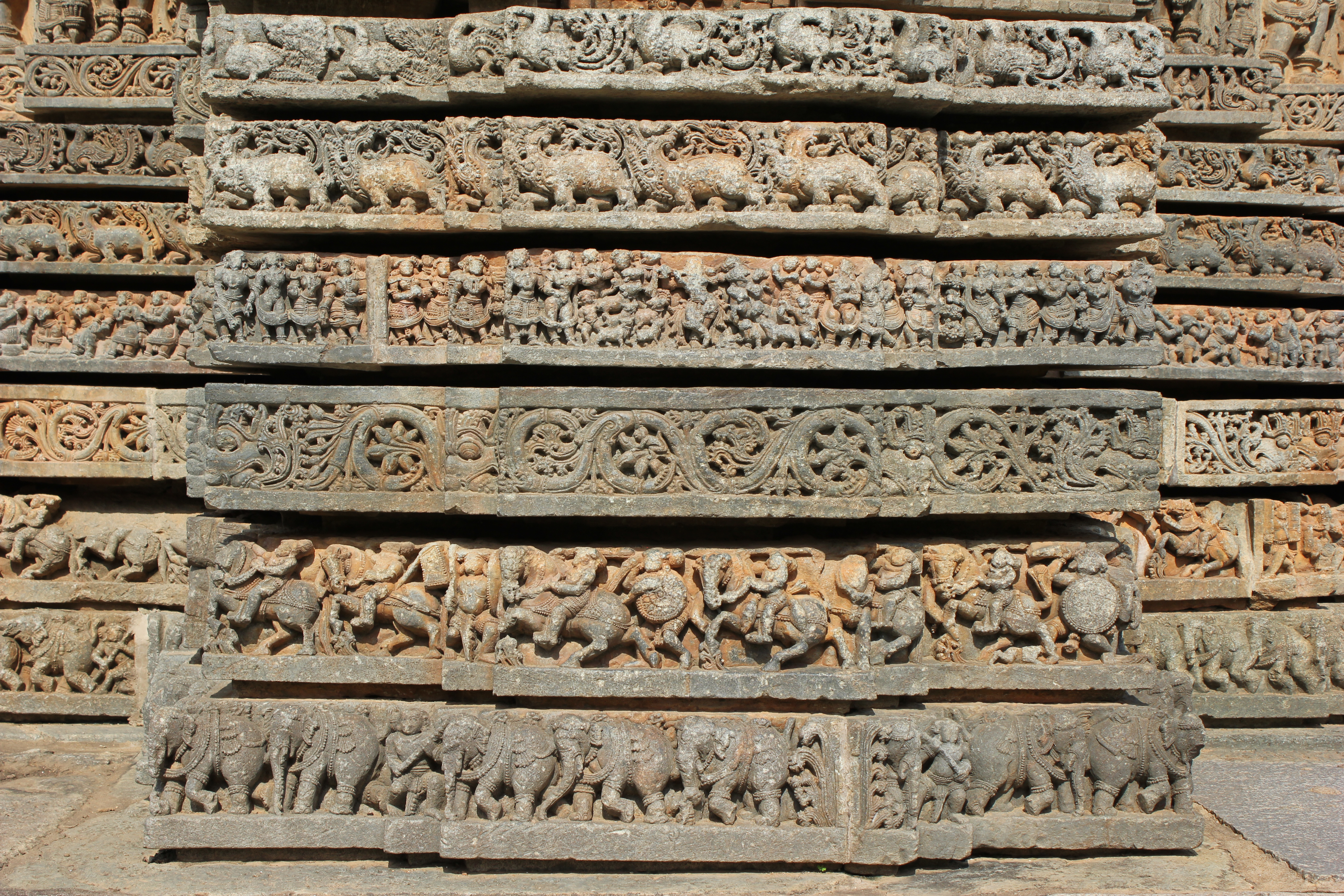
Molding frieze in bas-relief on the circumambulatory path around the temple at the Lakshmi Narasimha temple, Nuggehalli

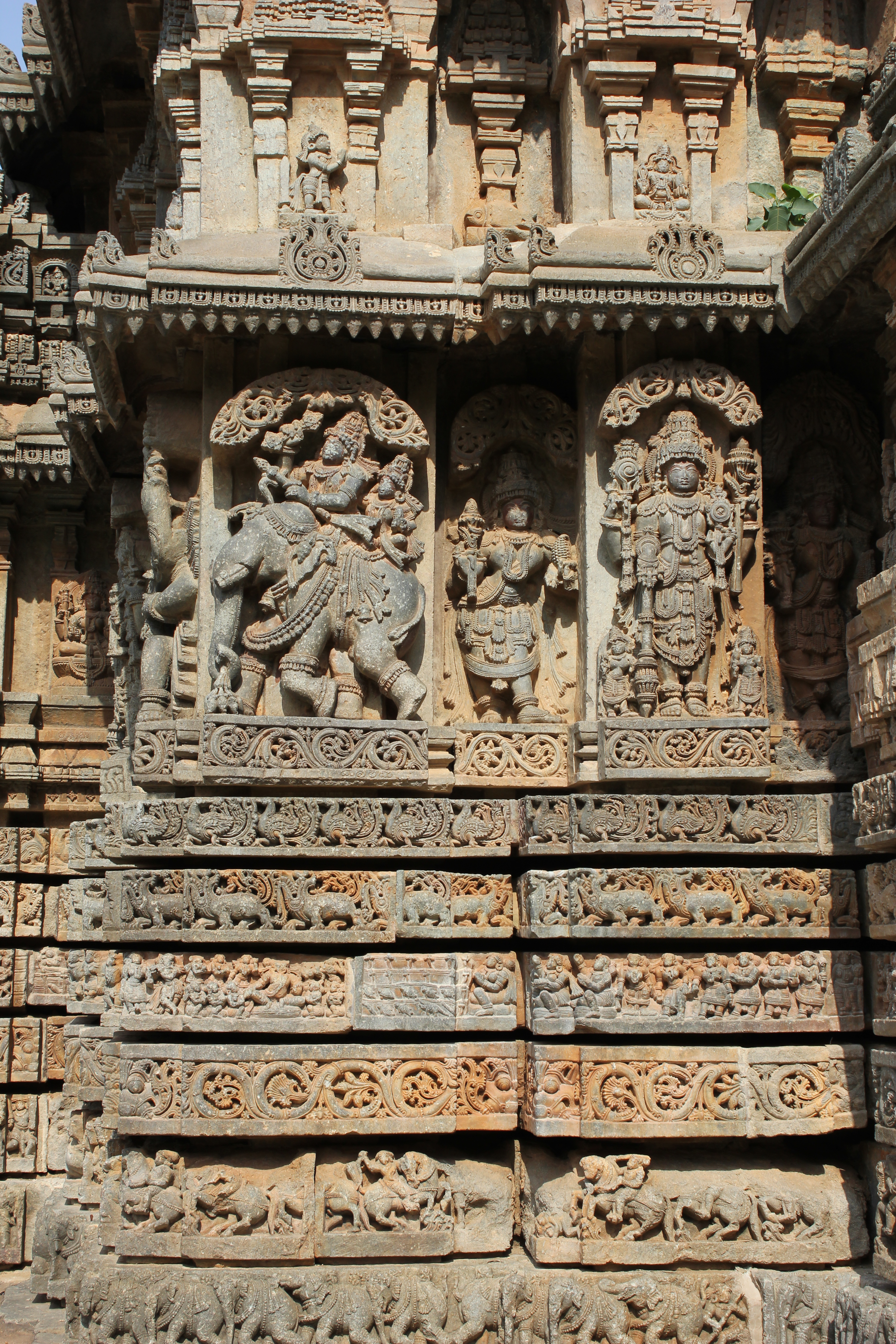
Temple's base moldings with Relief sculpture at Lakshmi Narasimha temple, Nuggehalli

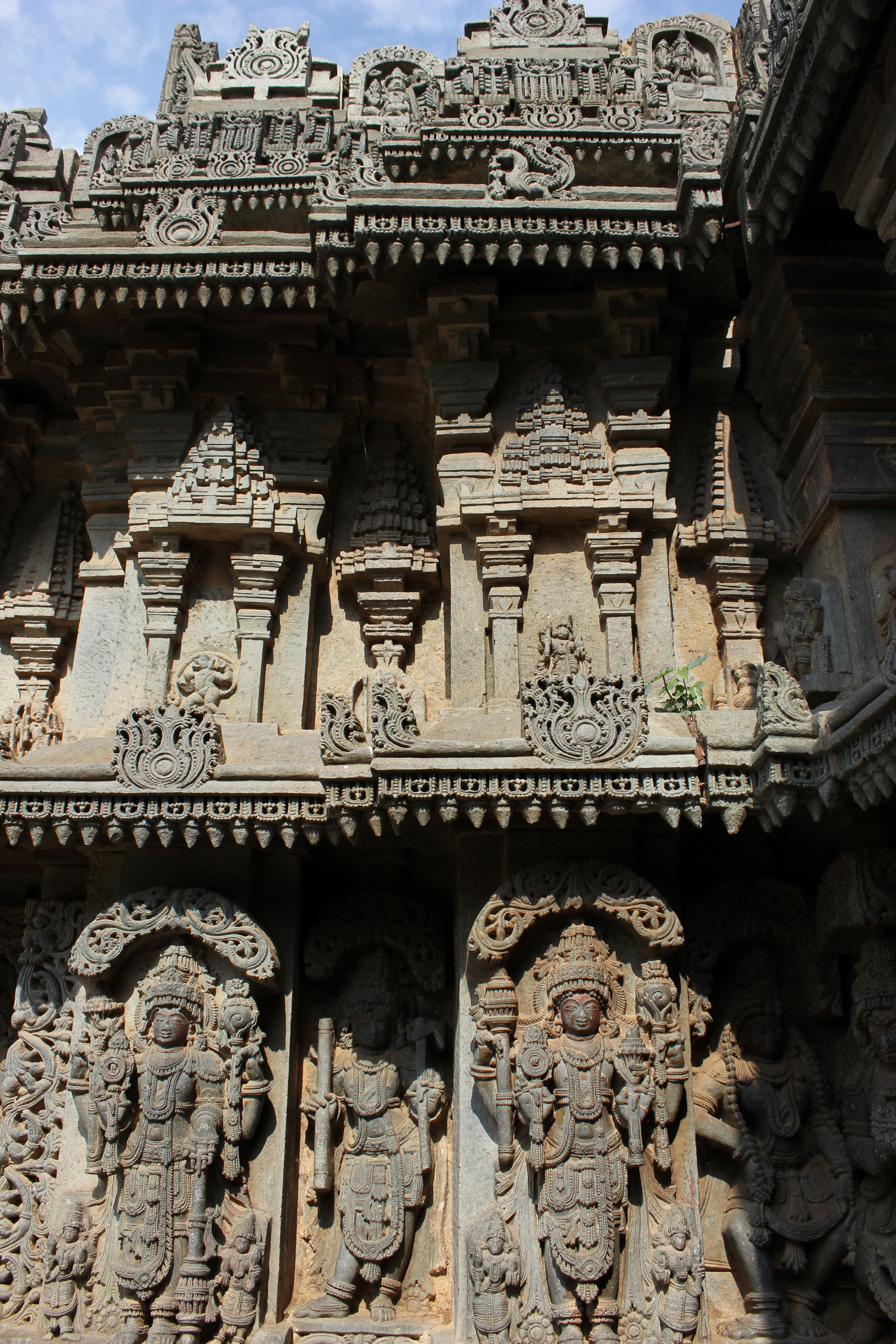
Hindu deities and aediculae in relief at Lakshmi Narasimha temple, Nuggehalli

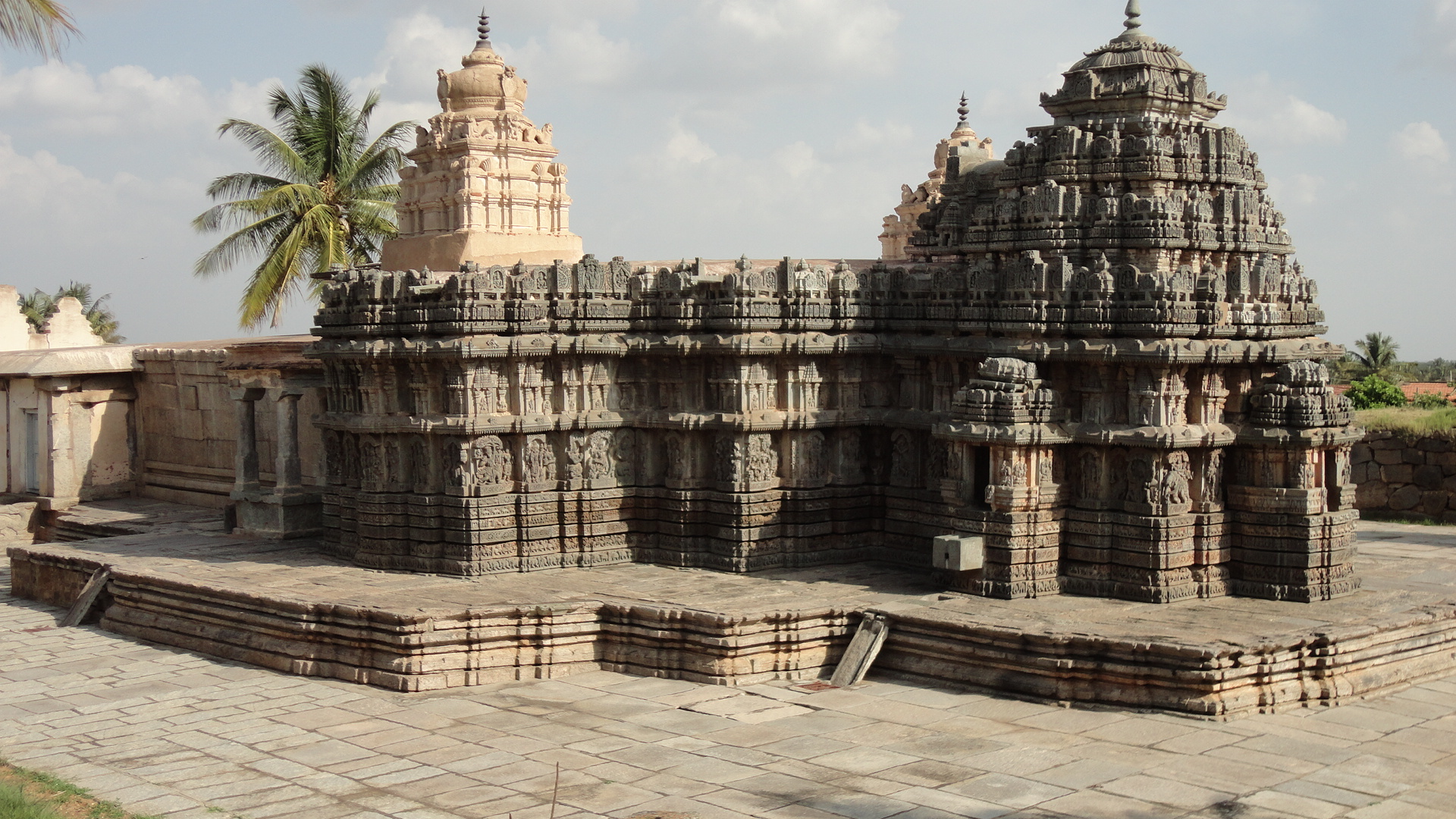
The original temple on the jagati, view from northwestern corner

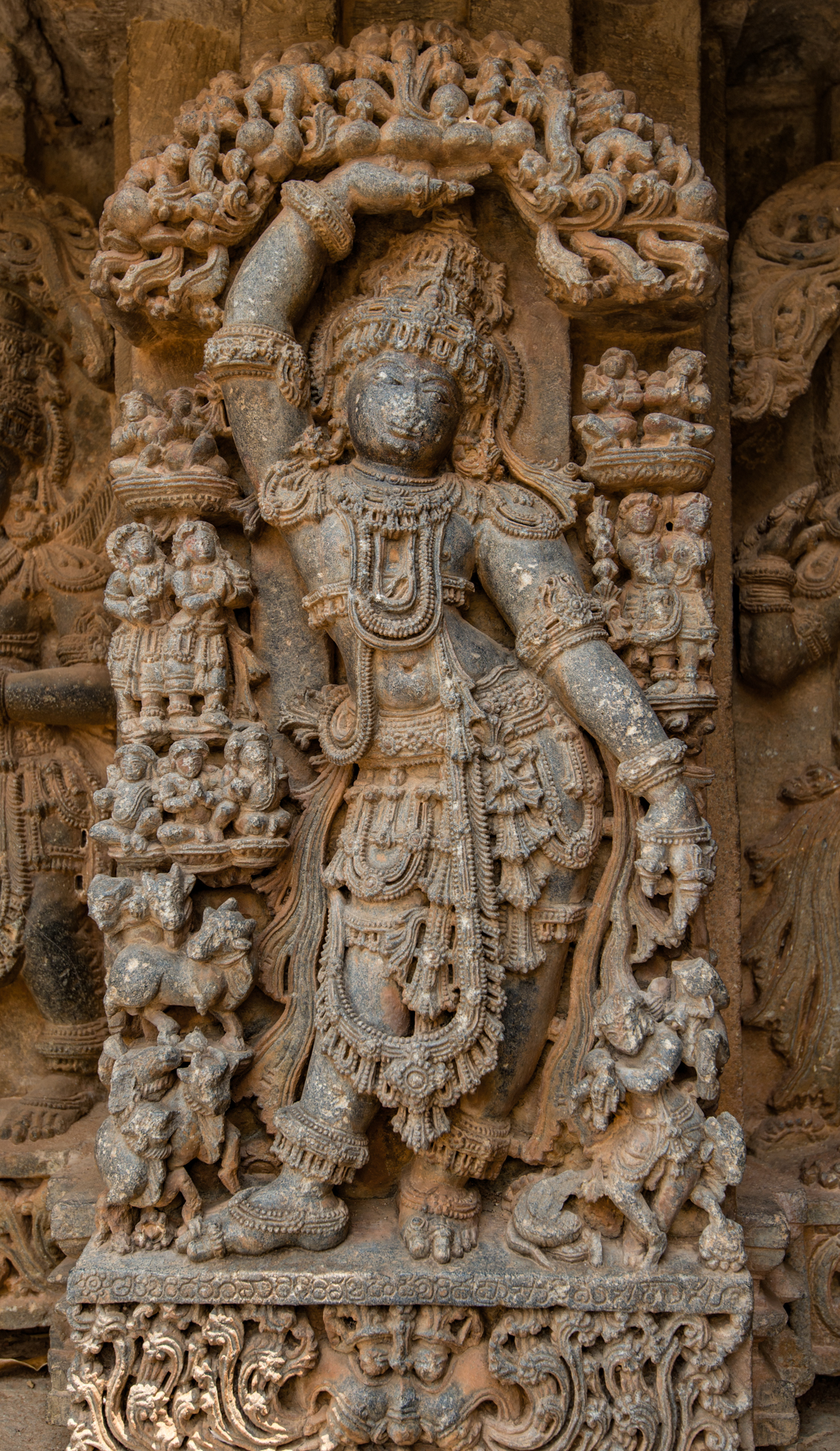
Krishna Goverdhandhara

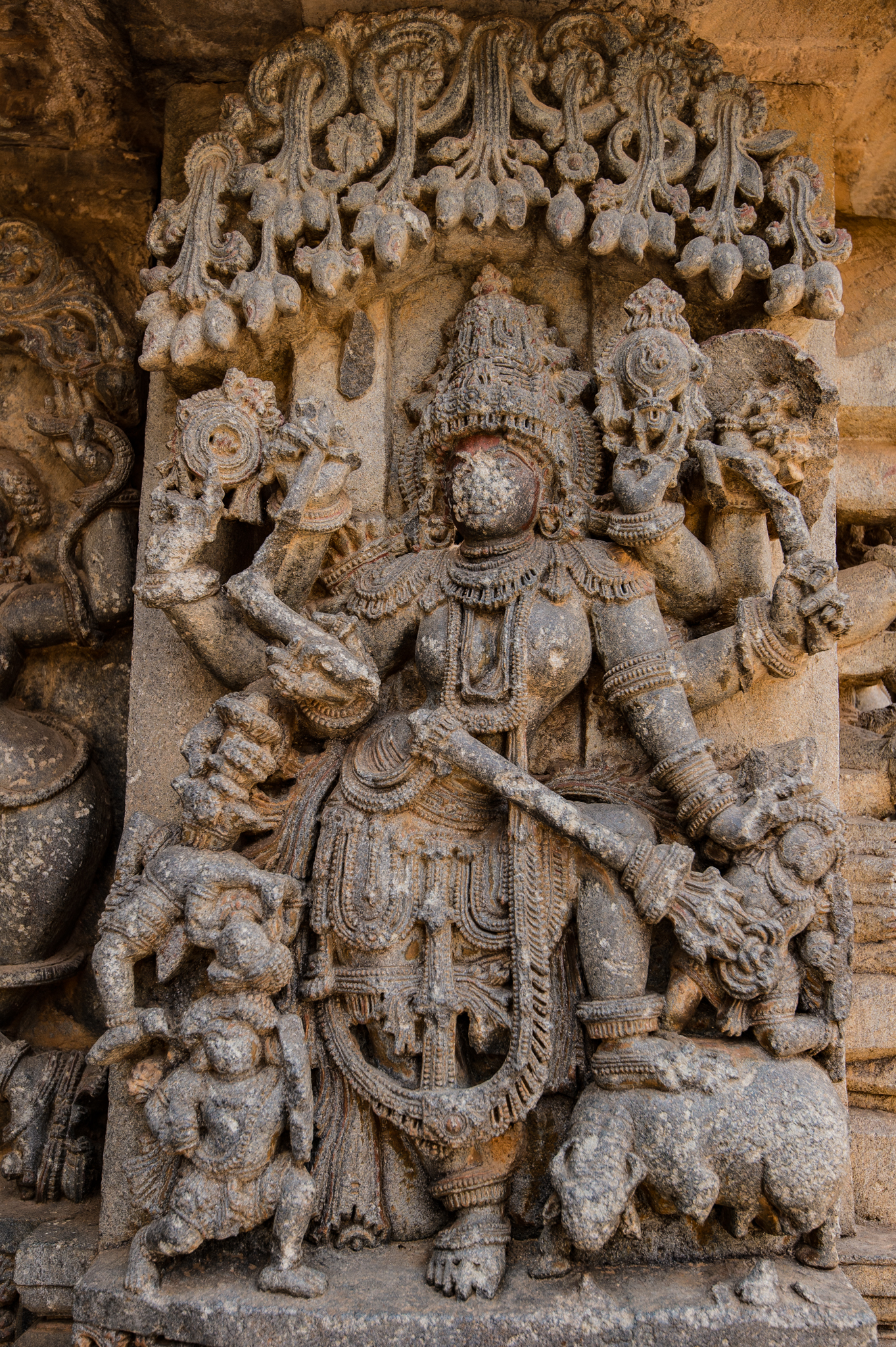
Durga Mahisasuramardini

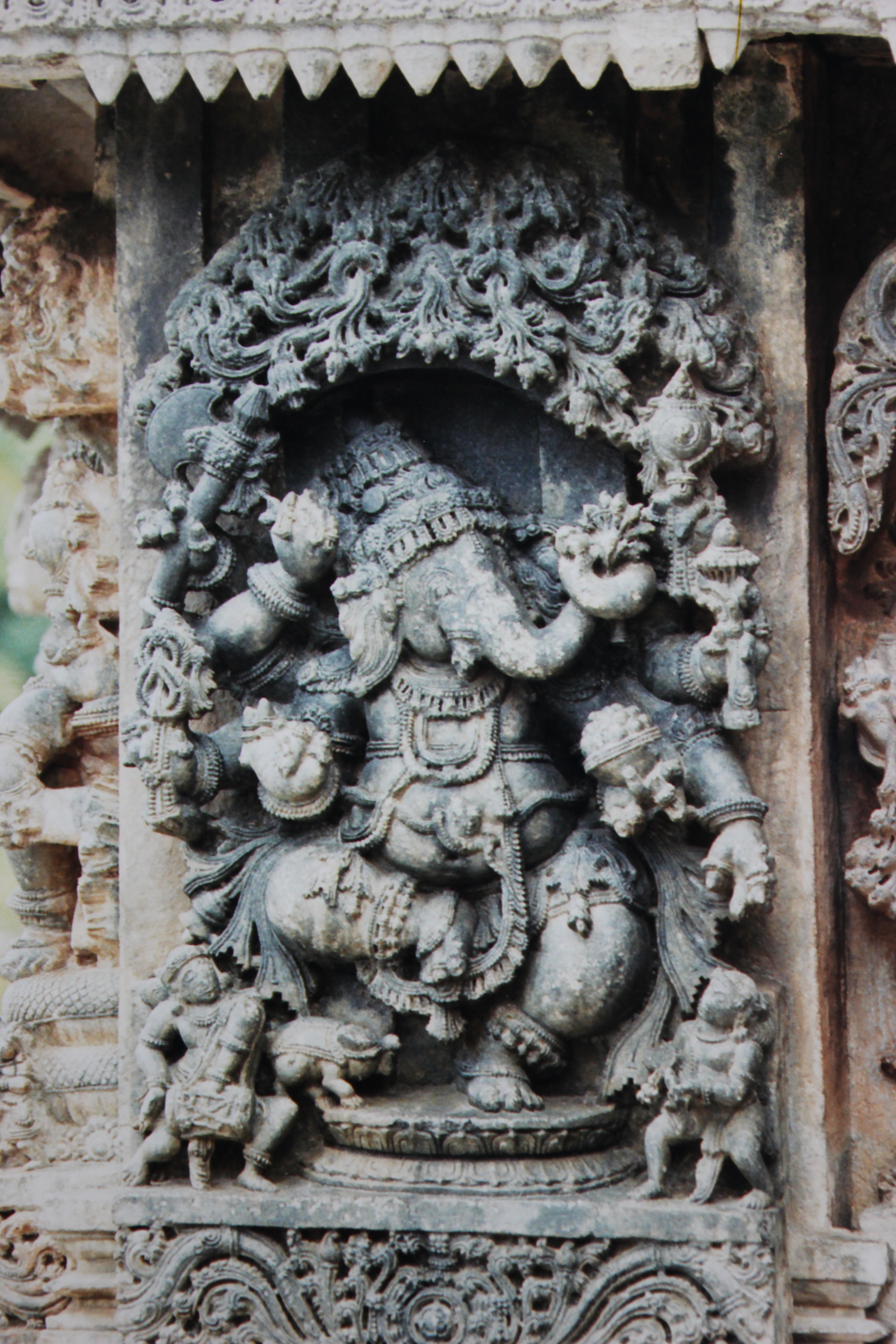
Dancing Ganesha

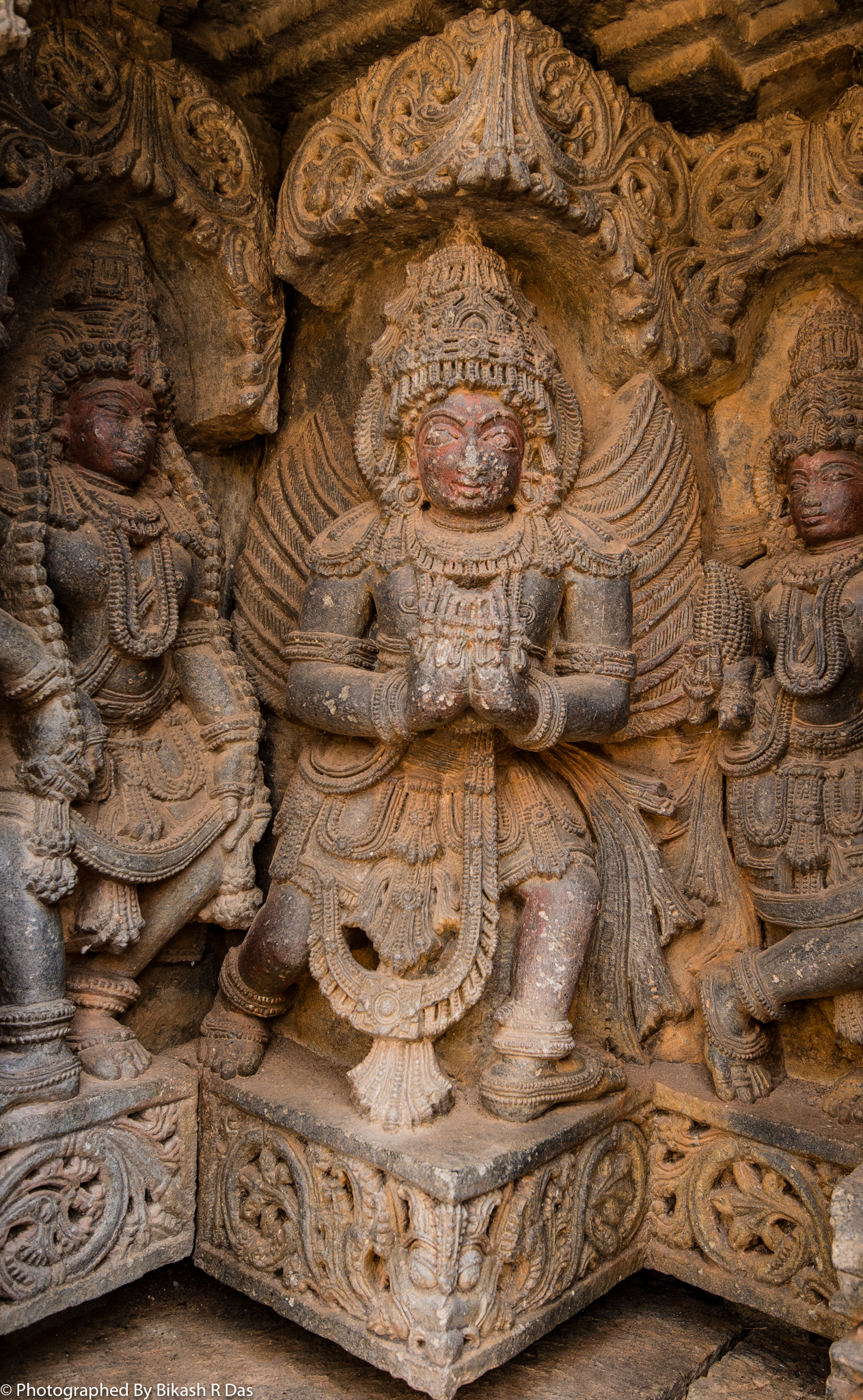
Garuda
